= R-77 =

Soviet beyond visual range air-to-air missile

R-77/RVV-AE AA-12 Adder
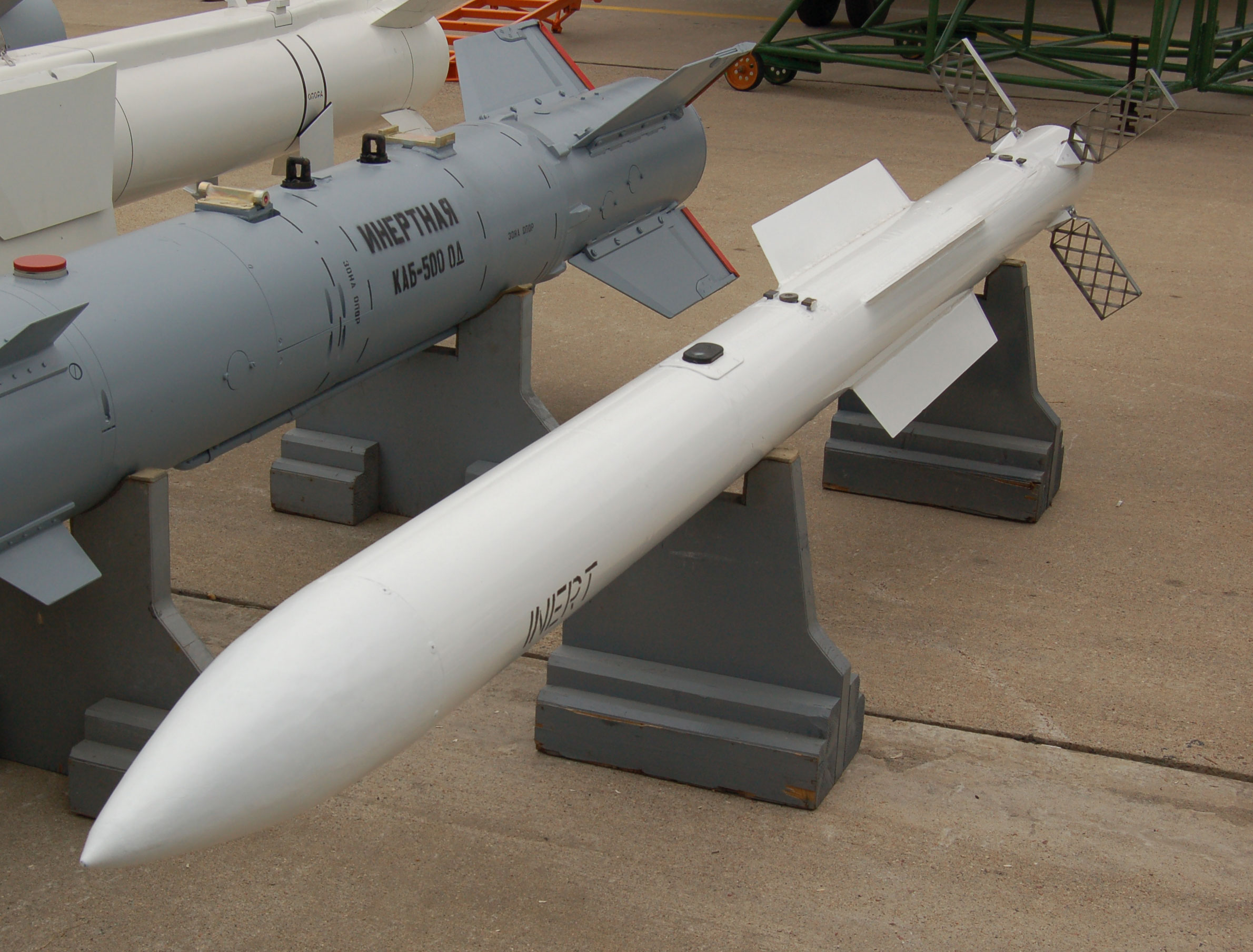
- Type: Medium range radar guided air-to-air missile

Service history
- In service: 1994 (R-77)

Production history
- Manufacturer: Molnija OKB, Artem, Vympel

Specifications
- Mass: 175 kg (R-77), 190 kg (R-77-1)
- Length: 3.6 m (R-77), 3.71 m (R-77-1)
- Diameter: 200 mm
- Wingspan: 700 mm
- Warhead: 22.5 kg HE fragmenting (R-77)
- Detonation mechanism: laser proximity fuse
- Engine: Solid fuel rocket motor (R-77)
- Operational range: R-77, RVV-AE: 80 kilometres (50 mi); R-77-1, RVV-SD: 110 kilometres (68 mi); R-77M, RVV-SDM: 190 kilometres (120 mi)
- Flight altitude: 5–25 km (16,000–82,000 ft)
- Maximum speed: Mach 4
- Guidance system: Transis guiding phase: Inertial guidance with mid-course SARH and datalink update. Terminal homing phase: Active radar homing/infrared homing (R-77T)/passive radiation homing (R-77P).
- Launch platform: MiG-21UPG, MiG-29, MiG-31BM, Su-27, Sukhoi Su-30, Sukhoi Su-34, Sukhoi Su-35, Sukhoi Su-57, J-11, Sukhoi Su-47, Mikoyan Project 1.44

The Vympel NPO R-77 missile (NATO reporting name: AA-12 Adder) is a Soviet active radar homing beyond-visual-range air-to-air missile. It is also known by its export designation RVV-AE. It is the Soviet counterpart to the American AIM-120 AMRAAM missile.

The R-77 was marked by a severely protracted development. Work began in the 1980s, but was not completed before the dissolution of the Soviet Union. For many years, only the RVV-AE model was produced for export customers. Production was further disrupted when the Russo-Ukrainian War resulted in a Ukrainian arms embargo against Russia, severing supply chains. The Russian Aerospace Forces finally entered the R-77-1 (AA-12B) into service in 2015 and the R-77M (AA-12C) in 2025. It was subsequently deployed by Su-35S fighters in Syria on combat air patrols. The export model of the R-77-1 and R-77M are called RVV-SD and RVV-SDM respectively.

== Development ==
Work on the R-77 began in 1982 by "Molnija OKB" in the Ukrainian SSR. After the dissolution of the Soviet Union, the R-77 (Izdelie 170) missiles were produced in Kyiv's "Artem" plant. It represented Ukraine's and later also Russia's first multi-purpose missile for tactical and strategic aircraft for fire-and-forget use against aircraft ranging from hovering helicopters to high-speed, low-altitude aircraft. Gennadiy Sokolovski, general designer of the Vympel Design Bureau, said that the R-77 missile can be used against medium and long range air-to-air missiles such as the AIM-120 AMRAAM and AIM-54 Phoenix, as well as SAMs such as the Patriot. The munition has a laser-triggered proximity fuze and an expanding rod warhead that can destroy targets of various sizes. It can be used against cruise missiles and precision-guided munitions (PGMs). First seen at the 1992 Moscow Airshow (MAKS), the R-77 was immediately nicknamed Amraamski by Western journalists. The basic R-77 is known as the izdeliye 170, while the export variant is known as the izdeliye 190 or RVV-AE. The R-77 and RVV-AE have a range of 80 km (50 mi). Vympel did not have adequate funding during the 1990s and the first part of the following decade to support further evolution of the R-77, either for the Russian Air Force or the export market. The basic version of the R-77 is not thought to have entered the Russian Aerospace Forces inventory in significant numbers.

The R-77 can be used by upgraded Su-27, MiG-29 and MiG-31 variants in Russian Aerospace Forces service. Some variants of the Su-27 in China's People's Liberation Army Air Force, including the domestically produced J-11 variants, can also employ the missile. The newer Su-30MKK has a N001 (Su-27 radar) with a digital bypass channel incorporating a mode allowing it to use R-77s. The export RVV-AE has been sold widely, with China and India placing significant orders for the munition, as was the case for the R-73. The baseline R-77 was designed in the 1980s, with development complete by around 1994. India was the first export customer for the export variant, known as the RVV-AE, with the final batch delivered in 2002.

There are other variants under development. One has an upgraded motor to extend a range at high altitudes to as much as 120–160 km; it is known as the RVV-AE-PD (Povyshenoy Dalnosti—improved range). This variant has been test-fired and uses a solid-fuel ramjet engine. Its range puts it in the long-range class and is equivalent in range to the AIM-54 Phoenix. In another version of the R-77, a terminal infrared homing seeker is offered. This is in line with the Russian practice of attacking targets by firing pairs of missiles with different homing systems. This complicates end-game defensive actions for the target aircraft, as it needs to successfully defeat two homing systems. If a radar-guided medium-range missile is fired at an enemy jet aircraft outside the non-escape attack zone, the target aircraft may be able to escape through emergency maneuver. But at this moment, in fact, the infrared guidance has an advantage: once the jet aircraft turns to escape, the engine nozzle is exposed, and the infrared characteristics are exposed. This method of attack may not always be available as IR seekers typically have less range and less resistance to poor weather than radar seekers, which may limit the successful use of mixed seeker attacks unless the IR missile is initially directed by radar or some other means.

Another improvement program was designated the R-77M, which made the missile longer and heavier, making use of a two-stage motor as well as an improved seeker. A further product-improvement of the R-77, designated the R-77M1 and then the R-77-PD, was to feature a ramjet propulsion device. This missile was destined for the MiG 1.44, which was developed for the MFI program. The munition has a laser fuse and an expanding rod warhead that can destroy the variable sized targets. However, due to funding shortage and eventual cancellation of the MiG 1.44, development of this model may have stopped by 1999; no information or announcement regarding the R-77M and R-77-PD has appeared since.

=== Further development ===
Tactical Missile Weapons Corporation, also known as TRV (Takticheskoe Raketnoe Vooruzhenie – Тактическое Ракетное Вооружение), unveiled the RVV-SD and RVV-MD missiles for the first time at the Moscow Air Show (MAKS) in August 2009. The RVV-SD is an improved version of the R-77, while the RVV-MD is a variant of the R-73. The RVV-SD includes the upgrades associated with the izdeliye 170-1, or R-77-1. The RVV-SD, along with the RVV-MD, seem to be part of Russia's bid for India's medium multirole combat aircraft competition. Both designations were included by MiG on a presentation covering MiG-35 Fulcrum armament during Aero India Air Show in February. The initial RVV-SD offering is likely no more than a stopgap to try to maintain its position, and to provide a credible radar-guided weapon to offer as part of fighter export packages and upgrade programs.

According to specifications, the R-77-1 and its export variant RVV-SD is 15 kg (33 lb) heavier than the basic R-77 / RVV-AE, weighing 190 kg (420 lb) rather than 175 kg (386 lb). Maximum range is increased to 110 km (68 mi) from 80 km (50 mi). The missile is also slightly longer at 3.71 m (12.2 ft), rather than the 3.6 m (11.8 ft) of the basic variant. Additional improvements include upgrades to the missile's radar seeker and boat tail rear section to reduce drag. Russian missile manufacturer Agat previously confirmed it was working on seeker upgrades for the R-77, implying that at least two projects were underway, one for export and one for the Russian Air Force.

Vympel, a which had merged to be part of TRV, has been developing a more extensive upgrade of the missile than the R-77-1. Designated the izdeliye 180 or K-77M, or R-77M when operational, this missile is a mid-life upgrade for the missile and is intended to be the main medium-range missile for the Sukhoi Su-57. This upgrade aims to provide a further improvement in range, with the design including a dual-pulse motor configuration. The izdeliye 180 uses an active electronically scanned array seeker and conventional rear fins instead of the R-77's lattice fins. This missile is intended to match the performance of the latest AIM-120 variants. Though it uses the same designation as the earlier R-77M improvement program, it is not known if these two missiles are the same or are related. The export variant of the R-77M is designated RVV-SDM.

On October 4, 2020 footage of Su-57 fighter flying with R-77M missile was revealed in a video released by the Russian Defense Ministry commemorating the 100th anniversary of the 929th Chkalov State Flight-Test Center

== Design description ==
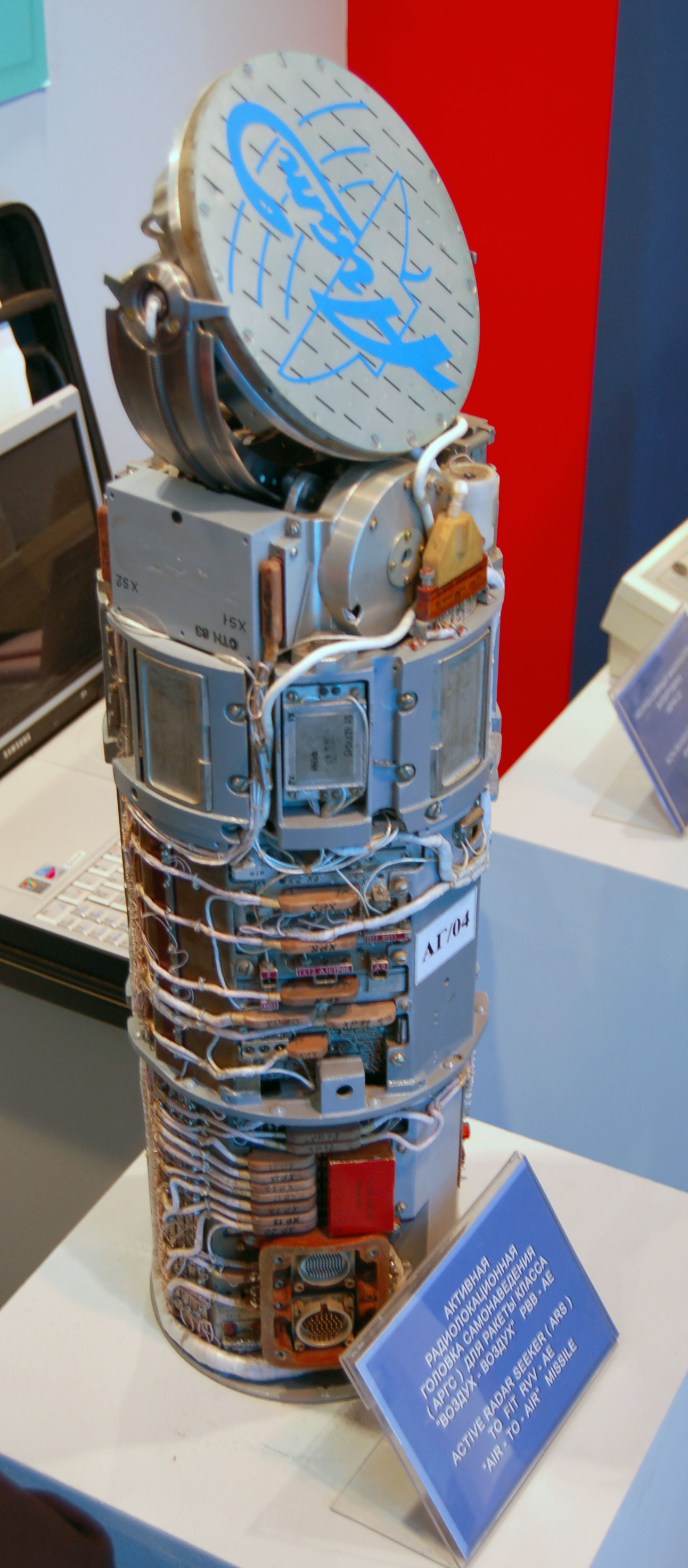
Seeker head of the Vympel R-77 at the 2009 MAKS Airshow

For the first forty years, the aerodynamics combined vestigial cruciform wings with grid fins used as tail control surfaces (similar devices are used on the OTR-23 Oka, and USAF uses them on MOAB). The flow separation which occurs at high angles of attack enhances its turning ability, giving the missile a maximum turn rate of up to 150° per second. However, the grid fins also increase drag and radar cross section. Updated variants of the R-77, such as the izdeliye 180 that is destined for the Sukhoi Su-57, will use conventional fins instead.

The missile uses a multi-function doppler-monopulse active radar seeker developed by OAO Agat. The radar features two modes of operation, over short distances, the missile will launch in an active "fire-and-forget" mode. Over longer distances the missile is controlled by an inertial guidance auto pilot with occasional encoded data link updates from the launch aircraft's radar on changes in spatial position or G of the target. As the missile comes within 20 km (12 mi) of its target, the missile switches to its active radar mode. The host radar system maintains computed target information in case the target breaks the missile's lock-on.

== Operational history ==
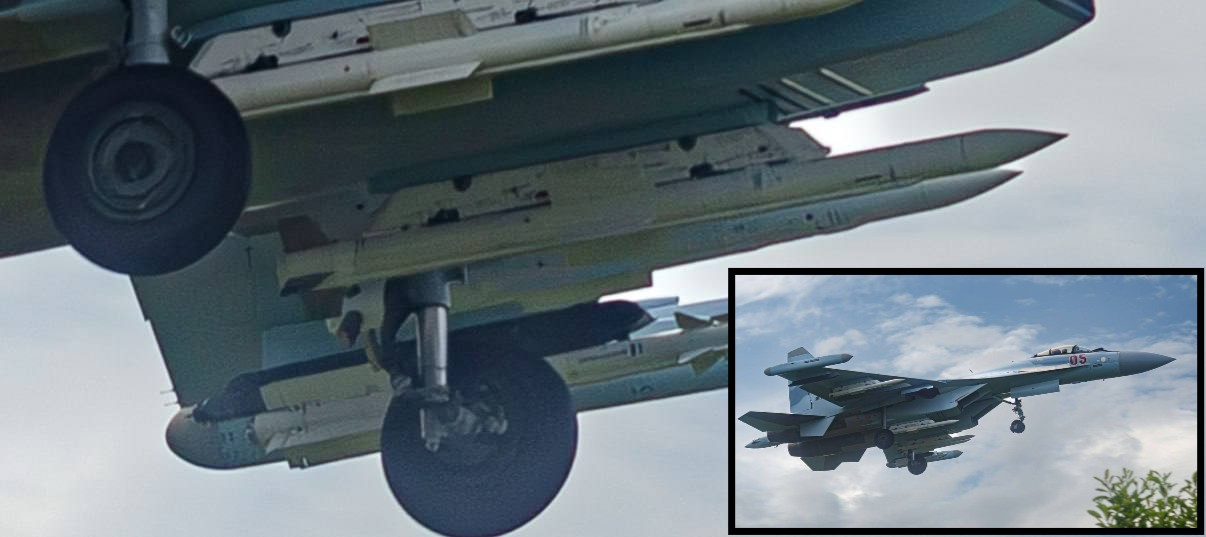
R-77M seen here on the pylon of Su-35S jet fighter. 16 July 2025, Kubinka airbase

At the beginning of February 2016, four Su-35S were deployed to Syria.

Since the 2022 Invasion of Ukraine, Russia has been using R-77-1s in Su-35s, Su-30SMs in combat against Ukrainian jets, which outranged all Ukrainian missiles. In July 2025, The War Zone reported that R-77M appeared to have made its operational debut in Ukraine following the wreckage of the missile and pictures taken on Su-35S showing the pylons equipped with R-77M, R-74M and 2 SAP-518M wingtip pods that form part of the Khibiny-M ECM system.

== Variants ==
R-77 variants: R-77 (RVV-AE), R-77PD (RVV-PD), RVV-ZRK, R-77M (izdeliye 180), K-77ME (izdeliyе 180-BD)

=== Produced variants ===
- R-77 (izdeliye 170) – Standard model, USSR-built variant.
- RVV-AE (izdeliye 190) – Russian-built export model of the R-77. Compared to all newer variants this missile has a reduced maximum range of 80 kilometres (50 mi) with 22.5 kg warhead.
- R-77-1 (izdeliye 170-1) – Russian-built variant with a streamlined nose, 9B-1248 (Izdeliye-50-1) active radar seeker head, and new fins.
- RVV-SD – Russian-built export model of the R-77-1. The missile has a maximum range of 110 kilometres (68 mi) with 22.5 kg warhead.
- R-77M (izdeliye 180) – In service with the Sukhoi Su-57 and Su-35S with a 9B-1103M2 AESA seeker, conventional fins, and dual-pulse motor.
- RVV-SDM - Russian-built export model of the R-77M.
- UP-277 - Ukrainian-built R-77 with conventional tail fins

=== Projects ===
- R-77P / RVV-PE – Passive radiation homing model.
- R-77T / RVV-TE – Infrared homing model.
- R-77-SRK – Ship-to-air variant.
- R-77-ZRK / RVV-AE-ZRK – RVV-ZRK Surface-to-air variant.
- R-77-PD / RVV-AE-PD – Ramjet model.
- R-77-PD ZRK / RVV-AE-ZRK – RVV-(PD-)ZRK Surface-to-air variant.
- K-77ME (izdeliye 180-BD) – Ramjet model of the R-77M.

== Operators ==
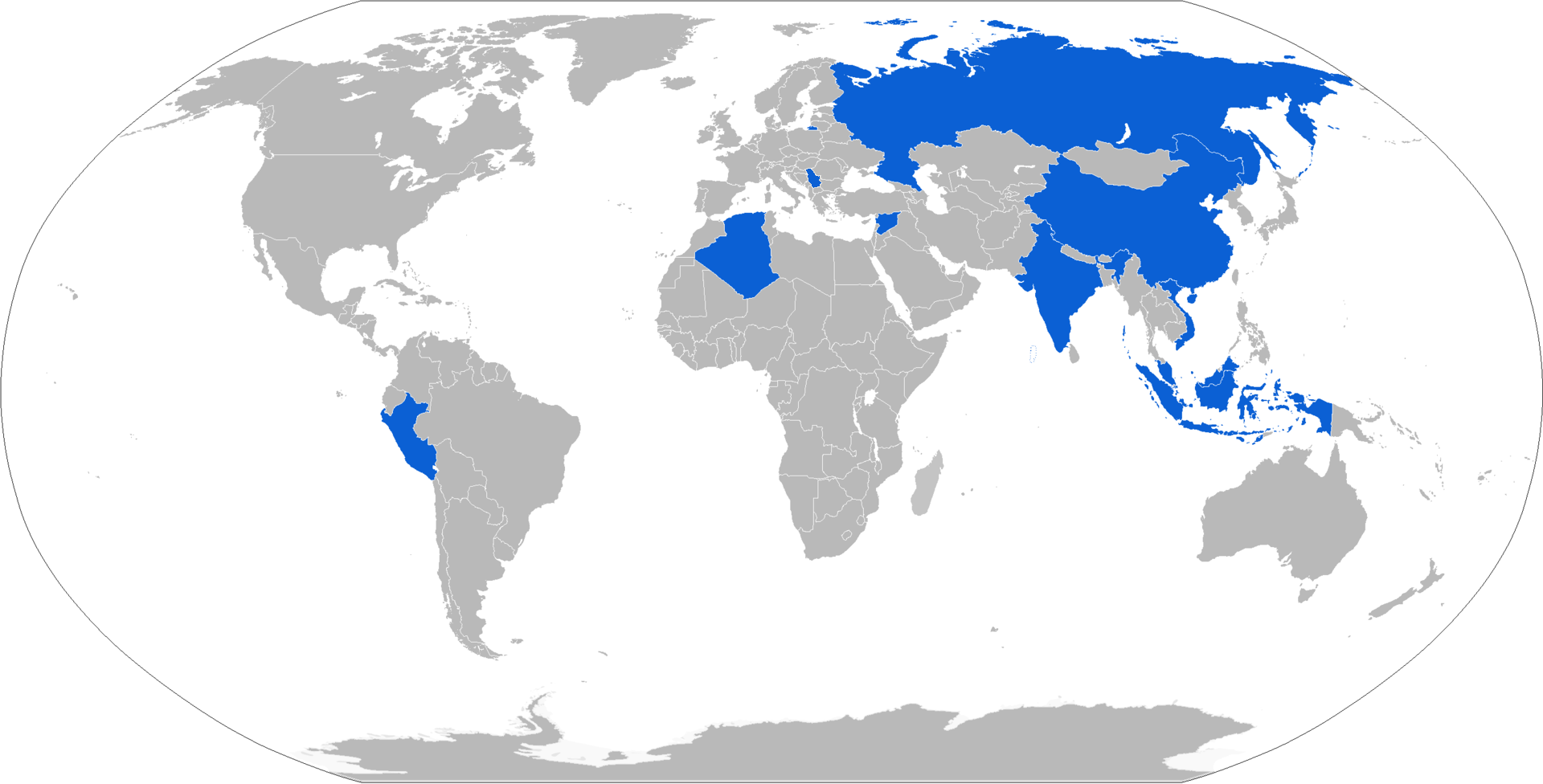
Map with R-77 operators in blue

=== Current operators ===
- Algeria – for the MiG-29M/M2 and Su-30MKA
- Egypt – 300 for the MiG-29M/M2
- Eritrea
- China – for the Su-35, Su-30MKK and Su-30MK2
  - People's Liberation Army Air Force
  - People's Liberation Army Naval Air Force
- India – formerly on the MiG-21 Bison, MiG-29UPG and Su-30MKI. Received 500 missiles in 2014-15, ordered 400 more in 2019, and more batches of RVV-SD (export R-77-1s) in May 2025.
  - Indian Naval Air Arm on MiG-29K/KUB.
- Indonesia – for the Su-30MK2 and Su-27SKM
- Kazakhstan – for the Su-30SM
- Malaysia – 150 missiles delivered as of 2008
- Russia – basic variant never officially introduced in series, Su-30SMs and Su-35S' were spotted with R-77-1s when they were deployed to Syria. Two contracts have reportedly been signed in 2015 for 13 billion rubles and in 2020 concerning modernized and import-substituted missiles for 65 billion rubles.
- Serbia – Serbia ordered 32 R-77-1 missiles for its modernized MiG-29s
- Sudan – for the MiG-29SE
- Syria – for the MiG-29SM
- Uganda
- Venezuela – 100 missiles ordered for Su-30MK2s
- Vietnam – for the Su-30MK2
- Yemen – 100 missiles delivered by 2006

=== Former operators ===
- Peru – used for a short time on MiG-29s

== See also ==
- List of missiles
- R-37 (missile) – (Russia)
- Novator KS-172 – (Russia)
- Astra (missile) – (India)
- Meteor (missile) – (France, United Kingdom, Italy, Germany, Spain, Sweden)
- AIM-120 AMRAAM – (United States)
- AIM-174B Gunslinger – (United States)
- AIM-260 JATM – (United States)
- GÖKTUĞ – (Turkey)
- AAM-4 – (Japan)
- Long-Range Engagement Weapon – (United States)
- PL-12 – (China)
- PL-15 – (China)
- PL-17 – (China)
- PL-21 – (China)
