= Raytheon Peregrine =

- Type: Medium range radar guided air-to-air missile
- Place of origin: United States

Production history
- Designer: Raytheon (RTX)

Specifications
- Length: ~6ft
- Propellant: Solid Rocket Motor
- Operational range: ~70nm (based on AIM-120)
- Guidance system: Multi-mode (Radar, Infrared)

The Raytheon Peregrine is a small, light-weight, medium-range air-to-air missile under development by Raytheon for intended use in the United States Air Force (USAF) and potential international export clients. Roughly half the size of the AIM-120 Advanced Medium-Range Air-to-Air Missile (AMRAAM), the Peregrine is claimed to have similar range to the AMRAAM, while holding similar maneuverability to the shorter-ranged AIM-9X 'Sidewinder' missile while maintaining a potentially lower cost.

== Design ==
The Peregrine is approximately six feet long, weighing 150 pounds (68 kg). With a reported 'tri-mode' or multi-mode seeker, it could potentially combine Active Radar-homing with Infrared Homing to achieve improved tracking capabilities compared to the older AIM-120 and AIM-9X missiles, and make it less susceptible to defensive countermeasures.

== Development ==
The Peregrine program was first publicly revealed at the USAF Association’s annual convention on September 16, 2019, and is intended to replace both the AIM-9X and AIM-120 in their respective roles under the USAF's SACM (Small Advanced Capabilities Missile) program, while complementing longer range missiles under development and entering initial service, like the AIM-260 JATM, AIM-174B Gunslinger and AIM-424 LRAAM under the Long-Range Engagement Weapon program (LREW).

== See also ==
- AIM-260 JATM
- Long-Range Engagement Weapon
- Small Advanced Capabilities Missile
- Miniature Self-Defense Missile
