= Small Advanced Capabilities Missile =

American air-to-air missile concept

The Small Advanced Capabilities Missile (SACM), occasionally referred to as the CUDA (expansion unknown) or Cuda™, is a United States Air Force (USAF) concept for a "next-generation," medium-range, relatively compact air-to-air missile. Unlike most air-to-air missiles, the CUDA uses "hit-to-kill" technology instead of an explosive warhead, allowing it to save weight by removing the relatively heavy explosive warhead. Designed to include a reduced size while maintaining the range of the AIM-120 AMRAAM, the CUDA seeks to replace the AIM-120's role, while allowing for more to be carried in the weapons bay of modern 5th generation fighters, such as in the F-35 and F-22. CUDA also reportedly uses a unique system of propulsive bursts around its airframe, allowing for supposed increased maneuverability, which could increase the probability of killing the target.

The CUDA was displayed in a photo in the November 2012 issue of the U.S. Air Force Magazine, with the caption 'A Lockheed Martin model shows how its "’Cuda" concept for a small AMRAAM-class radar guided dogfight missile could triple the air-to-air internal loadout on an F-35. The missile is about the size of a Small Diameter Bomb and fits on an SDB-style rack', and was officially revealed in January and February 2017, during a presentation and an interview by FlightGlobal with General Herbert Carlisle of the USAF.

The missile is under development by Lockheed Martin, and began evaluation by the Air Force Research Laboratory in 2019.

The missile has occasionally been referred to as the "AIM-160", but this is unlikely to be official, as the numeric designation of "160" is already utilized for the ADM-160 MALD air-launched decoy missile. The USAF has not verified any form of letter or number designation beyond the "SACM" moniker.

== See also ==
- AIM-260 JATM
- Long-Range Engagement Weapon
- Peregrine air-to-air missile
- Miniature Self-Defense Missile

=== Missiles of similar role, configuration, and era ===
- Astra Mark-3 – (India)
- Joint New Air-to-Air Missile – (France, United Kingdom, Italy, Germany, Spain, Sweden)
- PL-21 – (China)
