= SACM =

SACM or SAC-M may refer to:

- Society of Authors and Composers of Mexico
- Société Alsacienne de Constructions Mécaniques, a French engineering company
- South African College of Music
- Special Advisory Council for Myanmar
- Small Advanced Capabilities Missile
