= VX-31 =

Air Test and Evaluation Squadron 31
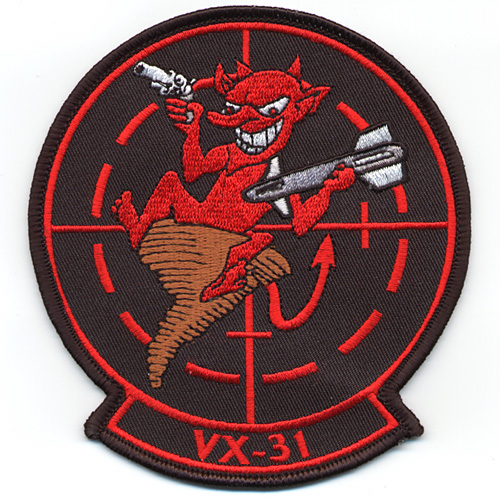
- VX-31 Insignia
- Country: United States
- Branch: United States Navy
- Garrison/HQ: Naval Air Weapons Station China Lake
- Nickname(s): "Dust Devils"
- Colors: DD

Air Test and Evaluation Squadron 31 (VX-31 or AIRTEVRON THREE ONE, commonly referred to by its nickname, "The Dust Devils" ) is a United States Navy air test and evaluation squadron based at Naval Air Weapons Station China Lake, California. Using the tail code DD, they fly numerous United States Navy and United States Marine Corps fixed-wing aircraft and helicopters such as the F/A-18F Super Hornet, E/A-18G Growler, F/A-18D Hornet, and the MH-60S Seahawk.

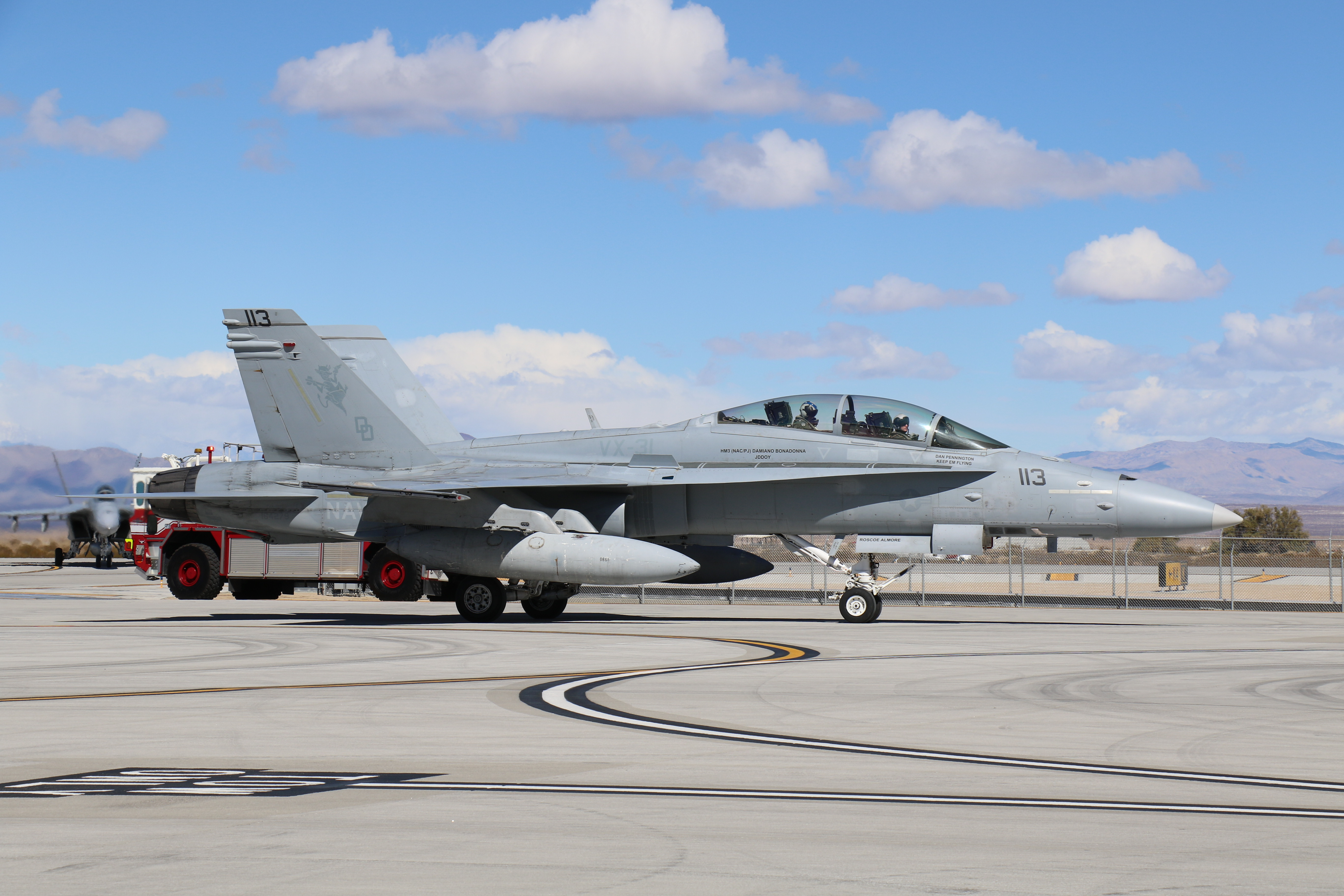
An F/A-18D Hornet from VX-31 taxing at NAWS China Lake

The squadron was critical in the testing of the AIM-260 JATM long range air-to-air missile. In 2024, "The Dust Devils" heavily contributed to the testing of the AIM-174B air-to-air missile as well.

In 2025, the squadron retired the AV-8B Harrier II from service, marking the last use of the jet from the Navy.

The unit patch is seen worn by Tom Cruise in Top Gun: Maverick.
