= R-37 (missile) =

Russian long-range air-to-air missile

Vympel R-37M NATO reporting name: AA-13 Axehead
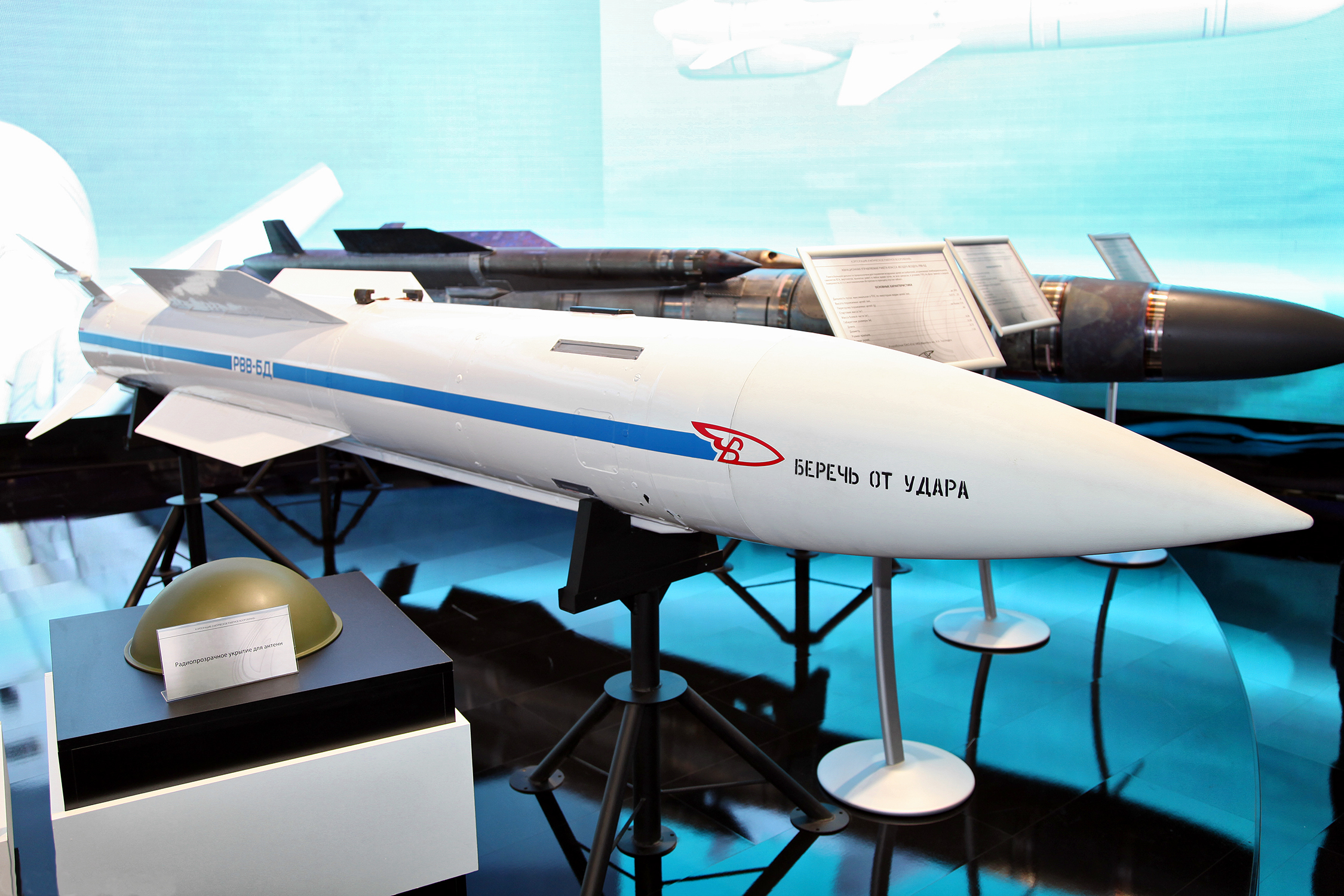
- R-37M (under the export designation RVV-BD) at 2013 MAKS Airshow
- Type: Very long-range air-to-air missile
- Place of origin: Russia

Service history
- In service: 2019–present
- Used by: Russian Aerospace Forces; Algerian Air Force

Production history
- Designer: Tactical Missiles Corporation
- Designed: 1980s
- Manufacturer: Vympel NPO
- Developed from: R-33
- Produced: Since 1985 (Prototype); 2019–present (Operational version)
- Variants: R-37M; RVV-BD (Export version)

Specifications (RVV-BD)
- Mass: 510 kilograms (1,120 lb)
- Length: 4.06 metres (13 ft 4 in)
- Diameter: 38 centimetres (15 in)
- Wingspan: 72 centimetres (28 in)
- Warhead: HE, fragmentation
- Warhead weight: 60 kg (135 lb), conventional or thermonuclear
- Propellant: Dual-pulse solid rocket motor
- Operational range: R-37M: 300–400 km (190–250 mi); RVV-BD: 200 km (120 mi)
- Maximum speed: Mach 6+
- Guidance system: INS + Active radar homing
- Launch platform: Su-57, Su-35S, Su-30, MiG-31

The Vympel R-37 (NATO reporting name: AA-13 Axehead) is a Russian very long-range air-to-air missile. The missile and its variants also had the names K-37, izdeliye 610 and RVV-BD (Ракета Воздух-Воздух Большой Дальности (Raketa Vozduh-Vozduh Bolshoy Dalnosti), "Long range air-to-air rocket"), and the NATO codenames "Axehead" and "Andi". It was developed from the R-33.

It is designed to shoot down tankers, AWACS and other C4ISTAR aircraft while keeping the launch platform out of range of any fighters that might be protecting the target.

According to Janes there are two variants, the R-37 and the R-37M; the latter conceived as having a jettisonable rocket booster that increases the range to "300–400 km" (160–220 nm). In 2023, Rosoboronexport introduced the export version of the R-37M, designated RVV-BD. It has a launch range of up to 200 kilometres (120 mi; 110 nmi) and maximum altitude of 25 kilometres (82,000 ft) with a 60 kilograms (130 lb) warhead. The missile is compatible with Sukhoi Su-57, Sukhoi Su-30, Sukhoi Su-35, Mikoyan MiG-31BM and Mikoyan MiG-35.

== Design ==
The R-37 was developed from the R-33. For compatibility with aircraft that did not have the MiG-31's sophisticated radar, the semi-active seeker was replaced with a variant of the Agat 9B-1388 active seeker. Similarly, folding tail controls allow semi-conformal carriage on planes that are not as big as the MiG-31.

Mid-body strakes enhance lift and hence increase range. According to Defence Today, the range depends on the flight profile, from 80 nautical miles (150 km) for a direct shot to 215 nautical miles (398 km) for a cruise glide profile.

The R-37M designation has since been used for a modernized variant of the missile, also known as RVV-BD (Raketa Vozduh-Vozduh Bolshoy Dalnosty, or Long-Range Air-to-Air Missile). R-37M's range exceeds 200 km, and it is capable of hypersonic speeds (~Mach 5). It will be carried by the modernized MiG-31BM interceptors and Su-35S and Su-57 multirole fighters.

A further derivative designed for internal carriage in the Su-57, designated as Izdeliye 810, has folding rear fins, shorter strakes, and updated seeker and motor.

The missile can attack targets at altitudes of 15 metres (49 ft)–25 kilometres (82,000 ft), guided semi-actively or actively through the Agat 9B-1388 system.

== History ==
The missile was designed in the early 1980s and first flown in 1989. Testing of the R-37 continued through the 1990s, and in 1994, a trial round scored a kill at a range of 162 nautical miles (300 km). However, the program appears to have been dropped around 1998 on grounds of cost. Work on the missile appears to have restarted in late 2006, as part of the MiG-31BM program to update the Foxhound with a new radar and ground attack capability.

In 2018, the R-37M had finished its operational validation tests. Zvezda TV reports have recorded the Su-35 carrying the R-37, apparently as part of an air combat loadout. In this configuration, the craft carries two R-73s in the central wing pylon, two R-77s slung underneath the engine nacelles, and two R-37s on the hardpoints between the engines, with an option to carry a few more missiles, such as a Kh-31 anti-radiation missile.

The US Defense Intelligence Agency revealed in a 2025 report that Russia is fielding a nuclear-armed air-to-air missile. While the report does not mention any specific missile, analysts believe that it refers to a nuclear-capable variant of the R-37M missile.

=== Operational history ===
The R-37M has, since October 2022, been the main threat against the Ukrainian Air Force. During the 2022 Russian invasion of Ukraine, MiG-31 aircraft have reportedly shot down several Ukrainian aircraft, mainly by using the long range R-37. By remaining at high speed and high altitude, MiG-31s have been able to operate virtually unopposed due to Ukrainian fighters lacking range, speed, or altitude necessary to engage the MiG-31. The Ukrainian Air Force lacked fire and forget missiles until the introduction of the AMRAAM and MICA. They relied on the R-27 missiles, both the R-27R and R-27ER. The Ukrainian pilot must illuminate the Russian aircraft with their radar to guide the missile to the target. Russian pilots firing active radar, fire and forget, R-77 give the Russian pilots the ability to launch their missiles and then take evasive action. Ukrainian pilots were forced to "exploit ground clutter and terrain-masking to get close enough to fire before being engaged".

A report by the Royal United Services Institute (RUSI) states that in October some six R-37Ms were being fired at the Ukrainian Air Force a day. The Su-35S is also used as a carrier for the R-37M. Four MiG-31 were also deployed to Crimea at the Belbek Air Base in mid 2022.

In August 2022, Russian forces maintained a Combat Air Patrol of either a pair of Su-35S or MiG-31s on station to shoot down Ukrainian aircraft. The RUSI stated: "The VKS has been firing up to six R-37Ms per day during October. The extremely high speed of the weapon, coupled with very long effective range and a seeker designed for engaging low-altitude targets, makes it particularly difficult to evade."

In February 2023, Ukraine obtained wreckage of a R-37M which would be of interest to Ukraine and Western countries.

According to a Russian source, the missile is carried by the Su-35S and Su-57 fighters, and the MiG-31BM interceptor.

According to Ukrainian pilots, the R-37M isn't achieving a lot of "hard kills", the destruction of actual Ukrainian aircraft. However, their launch forces pilots to abandon their current mission and take evasive action. Ukrainian pilots believe that the only defence is for their allies to supply them with F-16 fighter jets and AIM-120 AMRAAM missiles. While it won't close the distance, Ukrainian pilots hope that it will push back the effective range of missiles like the R-37. However, according to a Ukrainian official, Ukraine is looking for opportunities to modernize the F-16 Block 20 MLU fighter jets planned for transfer. Early generation AN/APG-66 radars of older F-16 Block 20 MLU only have similar range to Ukrainian MiG-29s and possess no significant advantage compared to current Ukrainian fighters and both are inferior to the radar of current Russian fighters used in the war such as Irbis-E and N110M Bars-M.

== Operators ==
Russia

- Russian Aerospace Forces: Operated by MiG-31s, Su-30SM2, Su-35s and Su-57s.

Algeria

- Algerian Air Force: Operates the RVV-BD (export variant) on its Su-30MKA and in the future on the Su-57Es, with possible licensed production in Algeria.

== Future operators ==
India

- Indian Air Force: As of April, 2026, it is reported that Russia has approved the export of roughly 300 R-37M missiles for the Indian Air Force (equipped with SU-30MKI), with a range of more than 350 km. As per the reports, the value of the deal is approximately US$1.2 billion, and the deliveries will begin within twelve to eighteen months from the deal signing.

== See also ==
- AIM-54 Phoenix – (United States)
- AIM-152 AAAM – (United States)
- AIM-174B Gunslinger – (United States)
- AIM-260 JATM – (United States)
- Novator KS-172 – (Russia)
- PL-21 – (China)
- PL-17 – (China)
- Long-Range Engagement Weapon – (United States)
- Meteor – (France, United Kingdom, Italy, Germany, Spain, Sweden)
- Astra Mark 3 – (India)

== Gallery ==
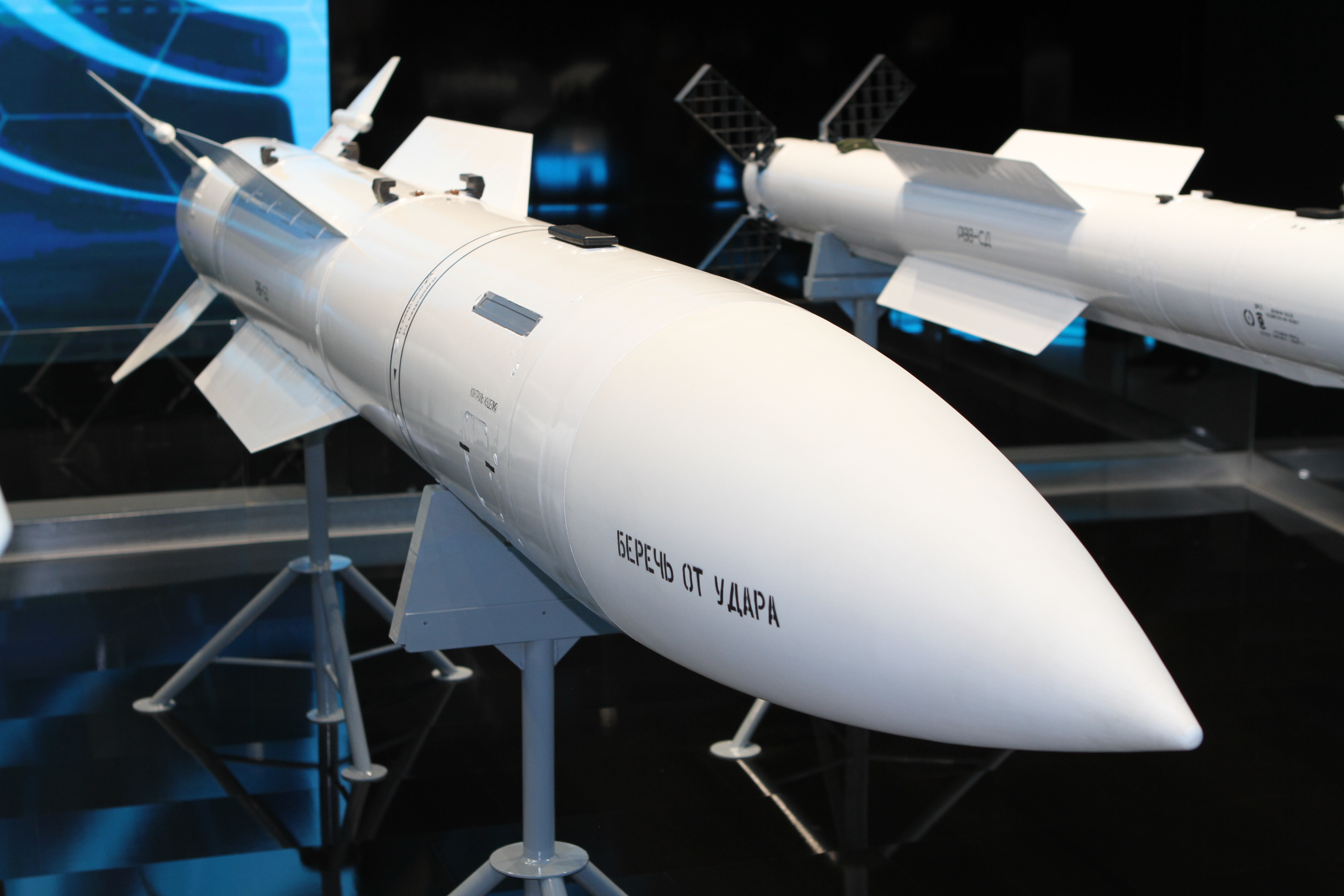
RVV-BD

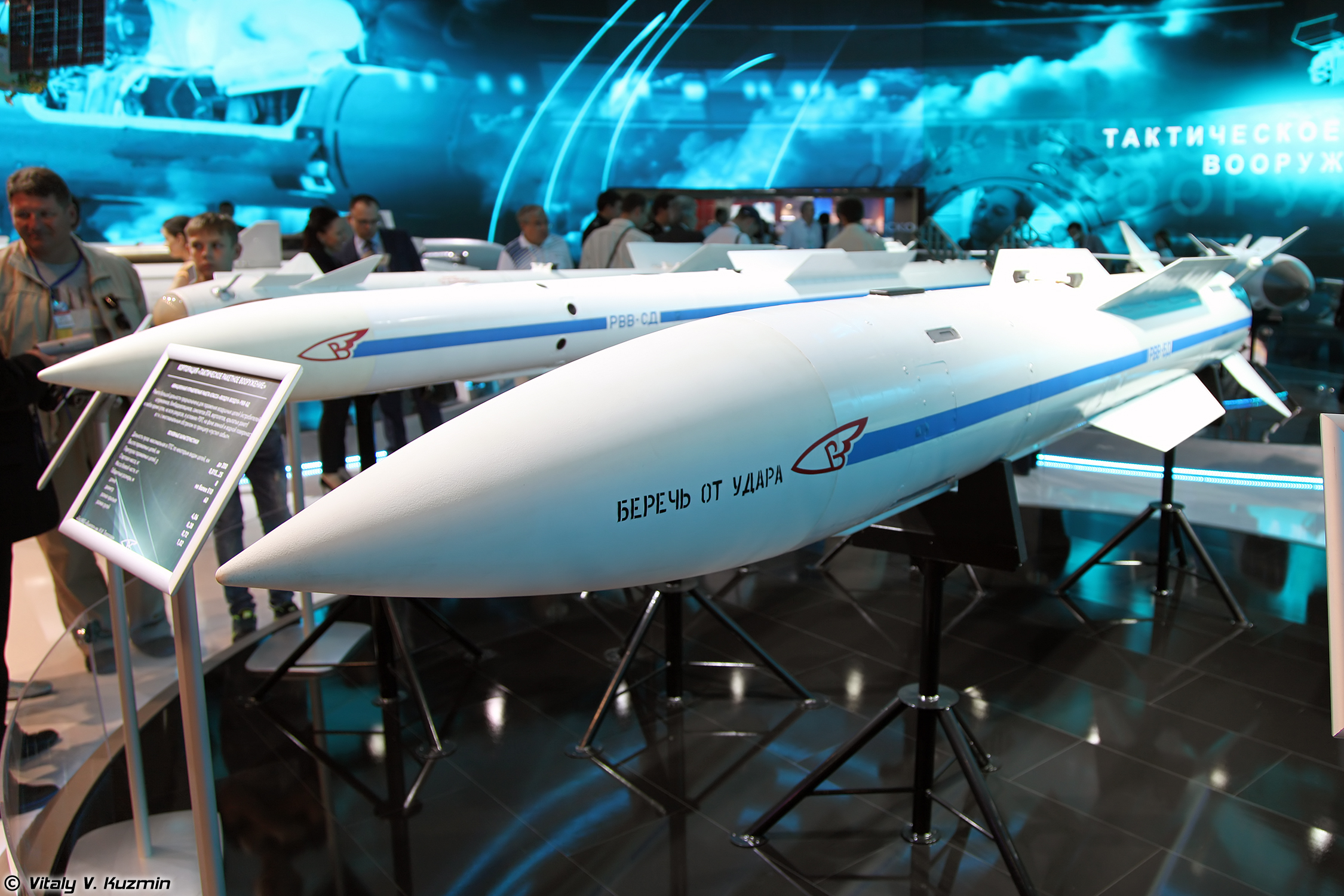
RVV-BD
