= AIM-424 LRAAM =

American long-range air-to-air missile

AIM-424 LRAAM - Malice
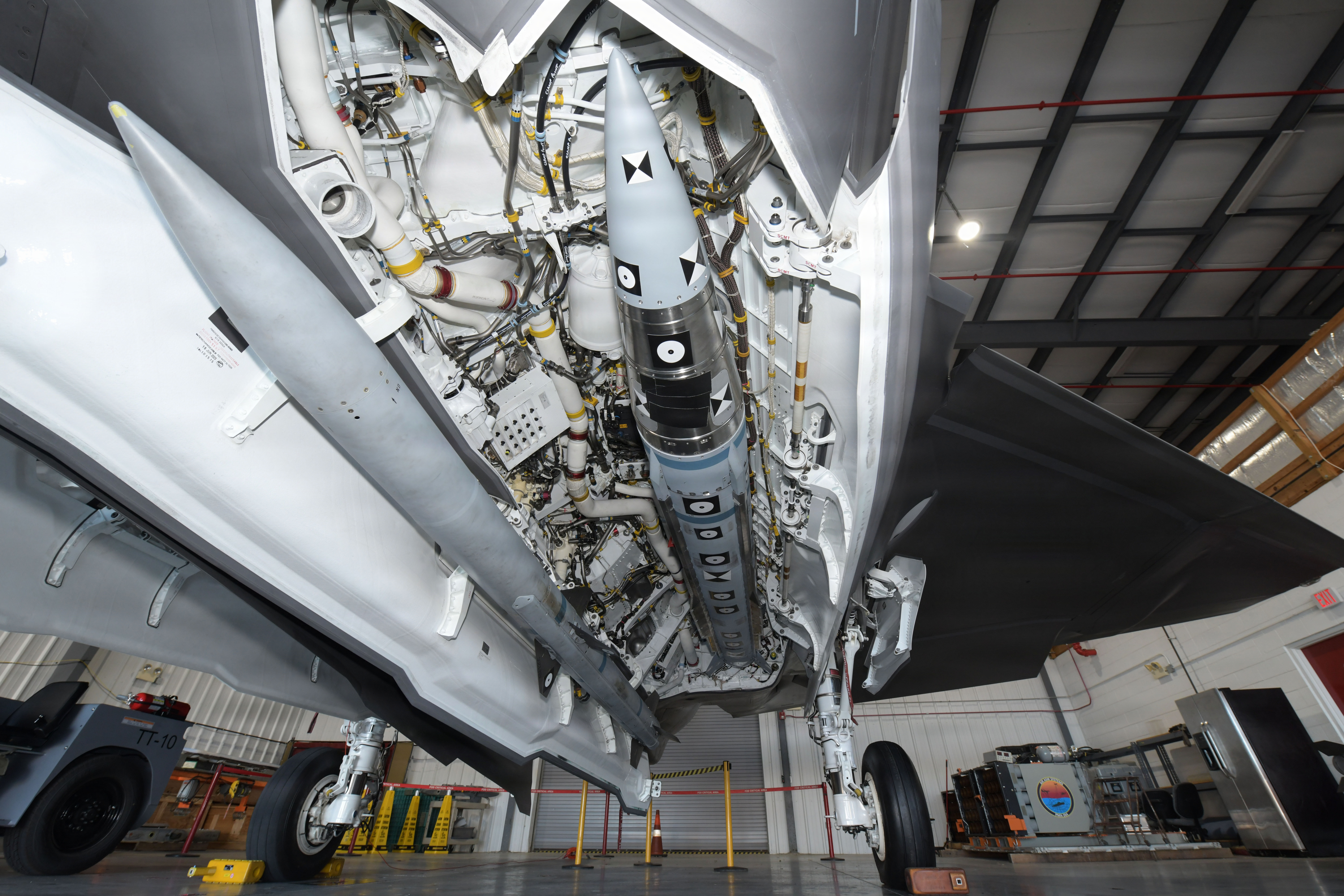
- An AIM-424 (right) mounted to the internal weapons bay of an F-35C, with an AIM-120 AMRAAM (left) mounted to the weapon bay doors
- Type: Long-range air-to-air missile
- Place of origin: United States

Service history
- Used by: United States Navy

Production history
- Manufacturer: Raytheon

Specifications
- Length: 13.5 ft (4.1 m)
- Diameter: 13.5 in (0.34 m)
- Wingspan: 26.2 in (0.67 m)
- Warhead: Blast fragmentation
- Engine: Two-stage solid-propellent rocket motor
- Operational range: 250 nmi (290 mi; 460 km)+
- Launch platform: F/A-18E/F; F-35C; F/A-XX

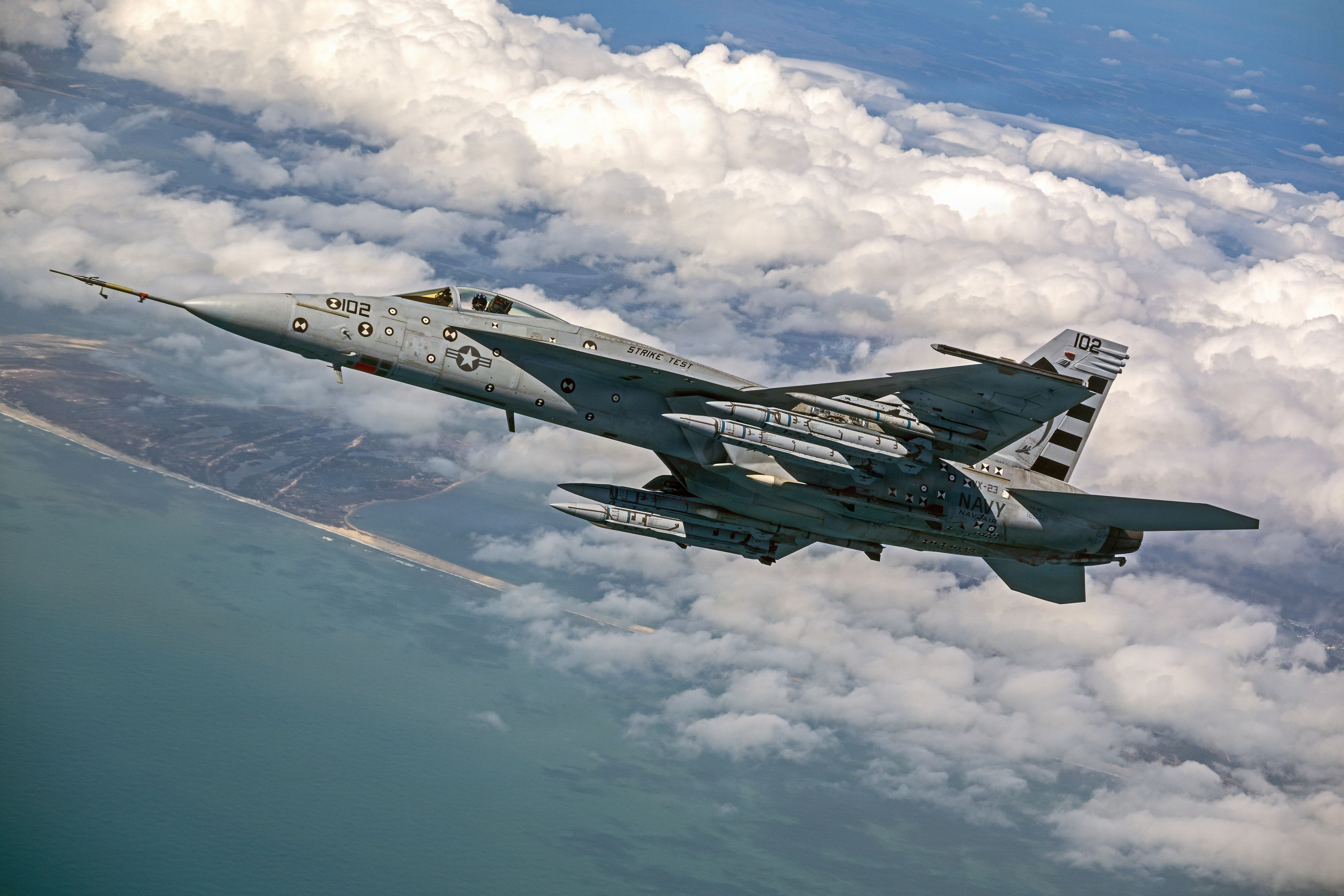
A VX-23 F/A-18E Super Hornet carrying four AIM-424 rounds during a test flight in April 2026.

The AIM-424 Long Range Air-to-Air Missile (LRAAM), also identified by the United States Navy as AIM-424 LRAAM - Malice or just Malice, is a long-range air-to-air missile under development by Raytheon for the United States Navy. The weapon was publicly disclosed at the Tailhook symposium in Reno, Nevada, on 22 August 2026, at which point it was already in flight testing.

== Development ==
The Navy announced the existence of the AIM-424 at the Tailhook symposium on 22 August 2026, stating the missile was in flight testing and was intended to be deployed on the F/A-18E/F Block III, the F-35C TR-3/Block 4, and the future F/A-XX.

According to Aviation Week, the AIM-424 concept may have been under lengthy development under the Long-Range Engagement Weapon (LREW) special access program. First disclosed in 2017, LREW was a United States Air Force-driven requirement for a two-stage air-to-air missile that could be carried in the internal weapons bay of a stealth fighter (F-35 or F-22), a similar use case to AIM-424. AIM-424 is a separate program from the Lockheed Martin AIM-260 Joint Advanced Tactical Missile (JATM), which the Navy and the Air Force are preparing to field at the time of the AIM-424's disclosure.

Development of the missile has been linked to Navy requirements for greater engagement range from carrier-based aircraft in response to the threat of Chinese air-launched anti-ship ballistic missiles and cruise missiles with ranges in excess of 1,000 nautical miles.

== Design ==
The AIM-424 is a missile broadly comparable in size to the AIM-174B Gunslinger (though slightly shorter and lighter) and substantially larger than the AIM-120 AMRAAM, weighing about thrice as much and nearly twice the diameter. A Navy photograph released through the Defense Visual Information Distribution Service shows four AIM-424 rounds carried by an F/A-18E Super Hornet from the Navy's Air Test And Evaluation Squadron 23 (VX-23) during a test event.

The missile may feature a dual-pulse solid-propellant motor to optimize kinematic performance during the cruise / ballistic coast (depending on flown trajectory) and terminal phases of flight. It reportedly employs a separating booster + upper-stage motor configuration.

== Specifications ==
The following is a list of AIM-424 LRAAM specifications:

- Primary Function: Air-to-Air Missile
- Contractor: Raytheon
- Propulsion: Solid-propellant rocket motor
- Length: 13.5 feet (4.11 m)
- Diameter: 13.5 inches (343 mm)
- Wingspan: 26.2 inches (665 mm)
- Weight: 1,500 pounds (680 kg)
- Range: In excess of 250 nmi (288 mi; 463 km)
- Warhead: Blast fragmentation

== See also ==
- AIM-54 Phoenix
- AIM-174B Gunslinger
- Raytheon Peregrine
