= Long-Range Engagement Weapon =

American next-generation air-to-air missile

The Long-Range Engagement Weapon (LREW) is a United States Air Force concept for a next-generation beyond visual range air-to-air missile. Concept images shows a large, two-stage missile launched from an internal weapons bay of an Lockheed Martin F-22 Raptor. There have been some reports that the LREW is too big to fit in the F-22 or Lockheed Martin F-35 Lightning internal weapons bay and is suited for the Boeing F-15EX Eagle II or Northrop Grumman B-21 Raider. It is currently being developed by Raytheon. This program is separate from Raytheon's own AIM-174B Gunslinger very long-range air-to-air missile as well as from the AIM-260 JATM, developed by Lockheed Martin.

According to Aviation Week, the Navy's AIM-424 Malice may have been developed under the LREW program, as it is a large, two-stage, clean configuration missile sized to fit within the F-35C's internal bay, and was revealed in August 2026 to already be in flight testing on the F-35C and F/A-18, with plans to integrate on the future F/A-XX.

== See also ==
- Small Advanced Capabilities Missile
- AIM-260 JATM
- Raytheon Peregrine air-to-air missile

=== Missiles of similar role, configuration, and era ===
- Astra Mark-3 – (India)
- Joint New Air-to-Air Missile (UK, Japan)
- PL-21 – (China)

Related lists

- List of missiles
