= PL-15 =

Chinese long-range air-to-air missile

PL-15 / PL-15E
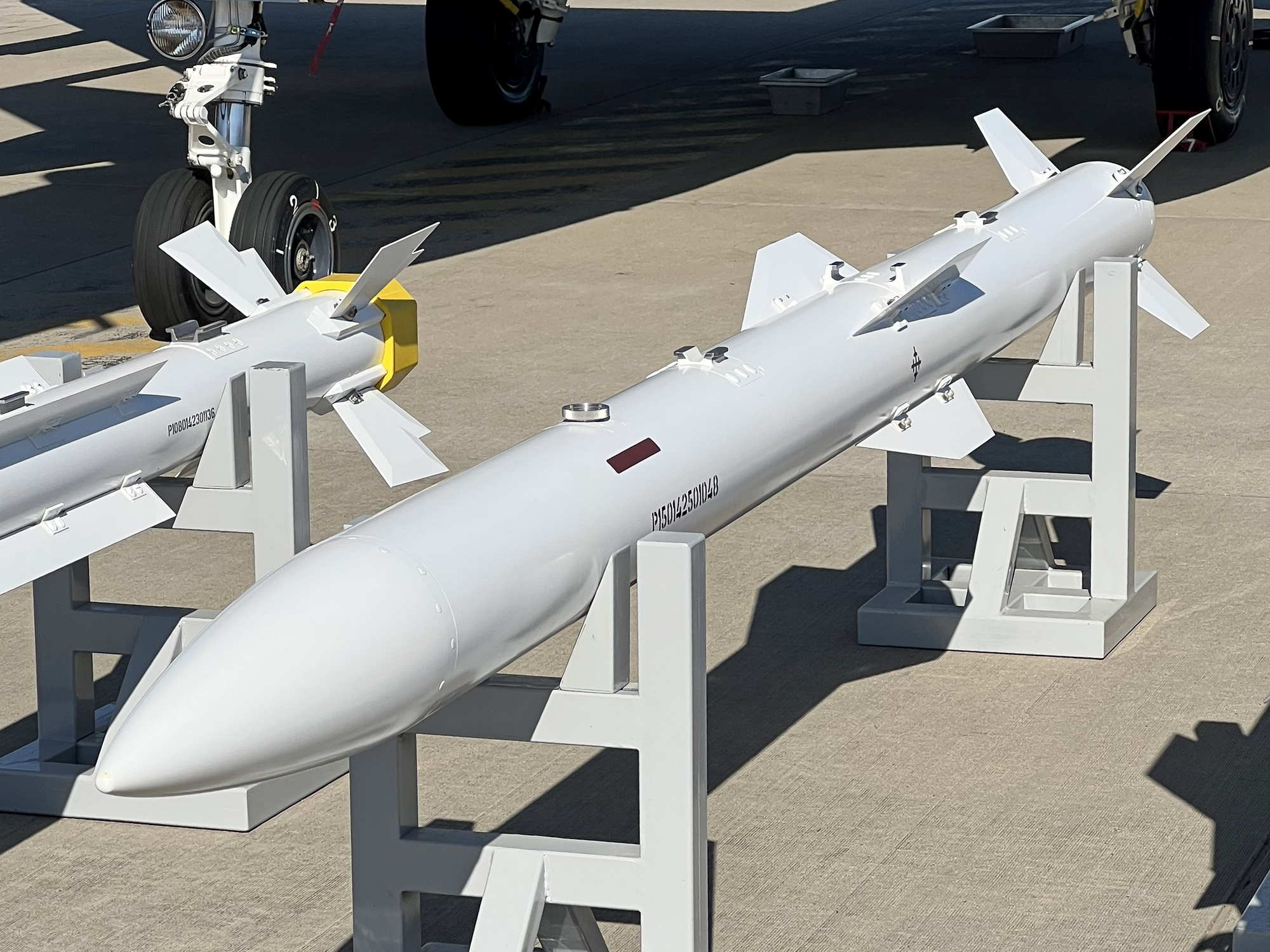
- PL-15 missile
- Type: Beyond-visual-range air-to-air missile
- Place of origin: People's Republic of China

Service history
- In service: 2016–present

Production history
- Manufacturer: China Airborne Missile Academy (CAMA)

Specifications
- Mass: 200–230 kg (441–507 lb) (PL-15) ≤210 kg (463 lb) (PL-15E)
- Length: 399.6 cm (13 ft 1.3 in) (PL-15E)
- Diameter: 20.3 cm (8.0 in) (PL-15E)
- Engine: Dual-pulsed solid-propellant rocket
- Operational range: 150–200 km (93–124 mi) (PL-15); 145 km (90 mi) (PL-15E)
- Maximum speed: Mach 5+
- Guidance system: Active radar homing
- Launch platform: J-20, J-35, J-10C, J-15T, J-16, J-11BG, JF-17 Block-3

The PL-15 (Chinese: 霹雳-15; pinyin: Pī Lì-Yāo Wǔ; lit. 'Thunderbolt-15', NATO reporting name: CH-AA-10 Abaddon) is a long-range active radar homing air-to-air missile developed by the People's Republic of China, in service of the People's Liberation Army Air Force (PLAAF) and Naval Air Force (PLANAF). The export version, PL-15E, is also used by the Pakistan Air Force. It is the primary beyond-visual-range missile for aerial combat used by PLA fighter aircraft, and its short-range counterpart is the PL-10.

The PL-15 can reach speeds of up to Mach 5 (6,100 km/h; 3,800 mph) and has a maximum range of 200–300 km (120–190 mi), though the PL-15E export version that is sold to Pakistan is reported to have a reduced range of about 145 km (90 mi).

== Development ==
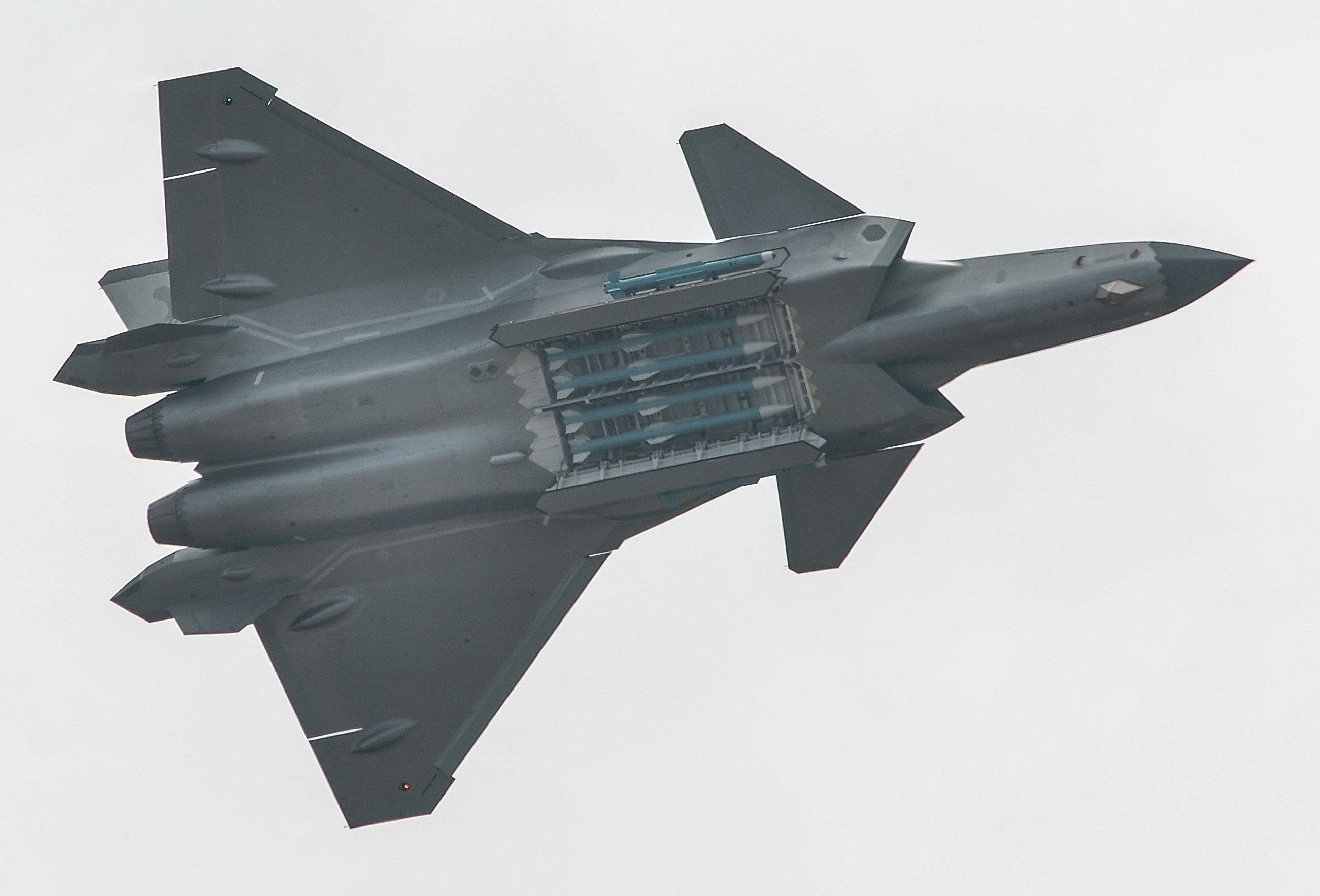
A Chengdu J-20 with four PL-15 inside the weapons bay

The PL-15 is developed by Luoyang-based China Airborne Missile Academy (CAMA). The missile was test-fired in 2011 and referenced by Chinese state media in 2015. It was spotted in 2013 mounted on a prototype of Chengdu J-20.

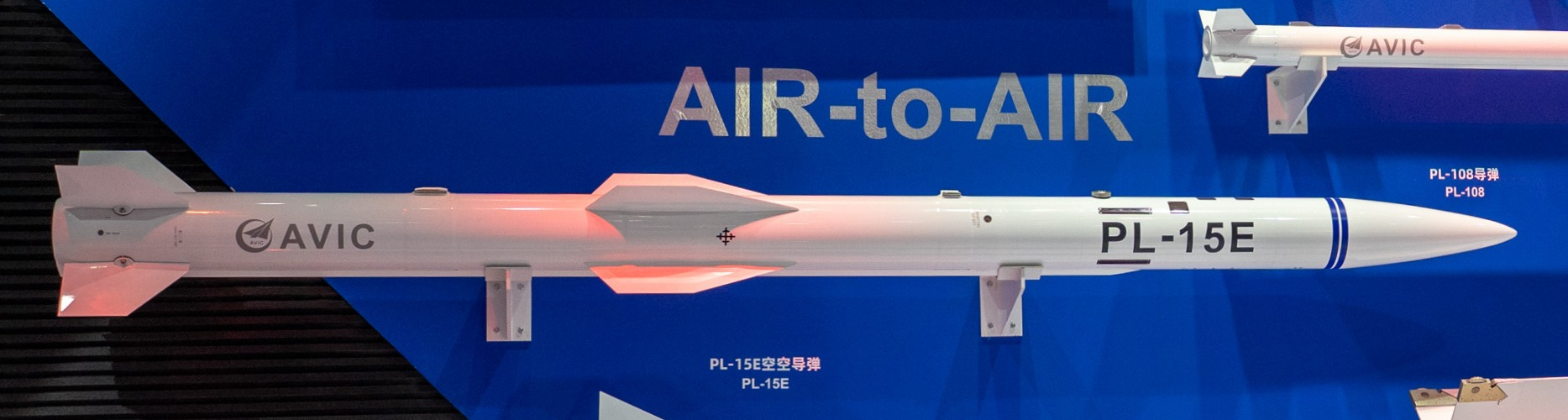
PL-15E mockup at Zhuhai Airshow 2024

The PL-15E, the export variant, was presented at the 2021 Zhuhai Airshow. The PL-15E's shorter range compared to the PL-15 is possibly due to changes in propellant or rocket motor. This is similar to the situation between SD-10 and its domestic counterpart the PL-12.

In 2020, the International Institute for Strategic Studies (IISS) reported the development of the PL-16 missile, a thinner version of the PL-15, to allow J-20 to carry six missiles inside its internal carriage. In January 2024, the PL-16 missile was confirmed to have a smaller airframe design with folded fins and a high-performance dual-pulse motor to maintain a performance level similar to the regular PL-15. At the 2024 Zhuhai Airshow, the export variant PL-15E was shown to have folding rear fins, allowing China to squeeze more missiles into the weapons bay of its stealth Chengdu J-20 and Shenyang J-35 aircraft.

US intelligence has alleged that the range of the missile was upgraded using technology provided by the UAE-based AI firm G42 to Huawei.

== Operational history ==
=== China ===
The PL-15 entered People's Liberation Army Air Force (PLAAF) military service around 2015 to 2017. The carrying platforms include the Chengdu J-10C, the Shenyang J-16 and the Chengdu J-20. It has also been spotted on the Shenyang J-11B. The PL-15 has begun to replace the earlier PL-12 as the standard beyond-visual-range air-to-air missile (BVRAAM) for both PLAAF and People's Liberation Army Naval Air Force (PLANAF) fighters.

=== Pakistan ===
On 7 May 2025, the PL- 15E was deployed in combat during the 2025 India–Pakistan strikes by Pakistan Air Force (PAF), marking what analysts believe to be the missile's first combat deployment.

According to the Pakistan authorities, PAF used Chengdu J-10C and PL-15/15E missiles to shoot down a number of Indian aircraft.

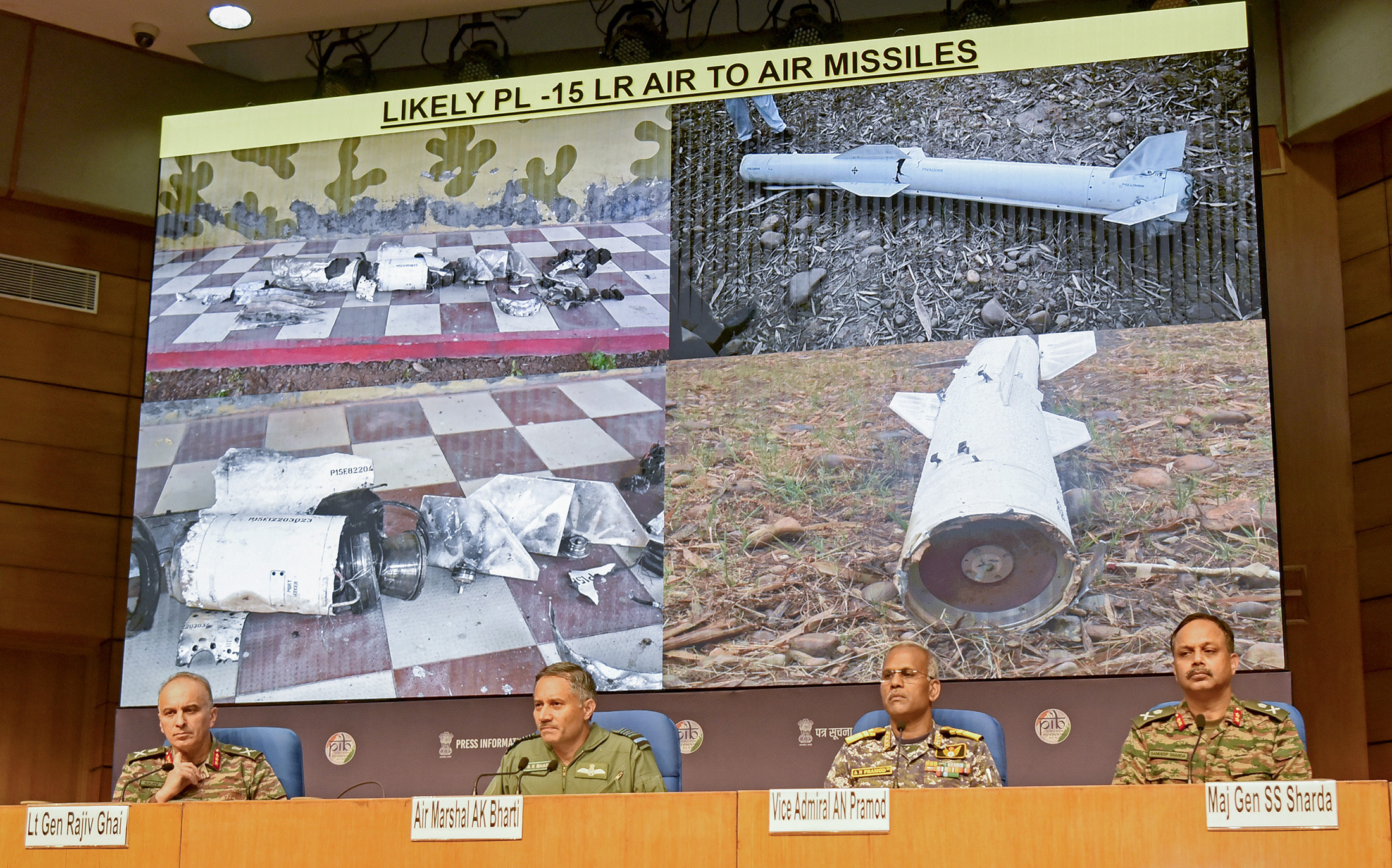
PL-15E debris recovered by India

Photos of several PL-15E missile debris found inside Indian territory surfaced. A relatively intact rear section was found in Hoshiarpur, Punjab, India. On 13 May 2025, the Indian authorities also confirmed the usage of PL-15/15E by Pakistan.

Many circumstances could lead to the loss of missiles in relatively intact states. The usage of PL-15E in the conflict offered military analysts opportunities to assess the combat effectiveness of the newest Chinese weaponry and its strategic implications. Analysis of the debris could offer technical insights into PL-15E's capabilities and limitations.

A reconstruction published by The Diplomat described that Pakistani J-10Cs armed with PL-15E missiles executed an "air ambush" from within their airspace, with missiles guided by airborne early warning and control (AEW&C) aircraft via XS-3 tactical data links, instead of J-10C's onboard radar. Other accounts, including a Reuters investigation citing Pakistani and Indian officials, instead attributed the network to Pakistan's indigenous Link-17 data link system, reporting that it connected the J-10C and its PL-15 with the Erieye AEW&C aircraft to enable radar-silent launches. This allowed radar-silent launches from a stand-off distance, reducing detection risk and exploiting limitations in the Indian Air Force's detection capabilities. The IAF's review of Operation Sindoor concluded that superior tactical data links and integration of advanced Chinese systems gave Pakistan a key advantage in the early stages of the conflict.

An investigation conducted by Reuters found that the Indian intelligence underestimated the range of PL-15E. Pakistani officials claimed the PL-15 that shot down Indian Dassault Rafale aircraft was launched from about 200 km (120 mi) away, with Indian officials claiming even farther distance—making it one of the longest-range air-to-air kills on record.

The Indian Armed Forces claims to have recovered multiple PL-15e that had landed "intact", and plan to use their advanced technology as benchmarks for future upgrades to the Astra AAM used by the IAF.

== Design ==
=== Propulsion ===
The PL-15 uses a dual-pulsed solid-fuel rocket motor capable of a burnout speed greater than Mach 5 and a range of more than 200 kilometres (120 mi). During its terminal phase, the second pulse of its motor ignites, providing additional energy and speed to increase kill probability at long distances. If launched at supersonic speed, the missile can maintain velocities above Mach 5 for much of its flight.

=== Airframe ===
The missile has a length of about 4 metres (13 ft) with a diameter of about 200 millimetres (7.9 in). It features cropped control fins (compared to the PL-12) designed for internal carriage by stealth aircraft.

=== Guidance ===
The missile is guided by a miniature active electronically scanned array radar seeker, sporting both active and passive modes for the different mission set. It also features improved resistance to countermeasures and better performance against low-observable targets. The hybrid guidance system supports a mid-course two-way datalink led by AEW&C aircraft and autonomous terminal radar homing.

== Foreign sales ==
In 2021, Pakistan acquired the PL-15E air-to-air missile from China as part of a $1.5 billion defense deal. The agreement included 20 J-10CE fighter jets and approximately 240 PL-15E missiles, making Pakistan the first international buyer of the PL-15E variant. The package also included additional logistical and support services.

== Variants ==
PL-15
PLAAF domestic version with an estimated range of 200–300 km (120–190 mi).
PL-15E
Export version of PL-15 with a reduced maximum launch range of 145 km
PL-15 with folding fins
PL-15 with folded tail fins that likely allow J-20 and J-35 internal weapons bays to carry six missiles.
PL-16 (CH-AA-X-13)
A further development of PL-15 that allows J-20's internal weapons bay to carry six missiles simultaneously (whereas PL-15 is quad-packed). The PL-16 missile, while smaller in dimension, features a compressed airframe, folded fins, and a high-performance dual-pulse motor to deliver equal or better performance compared to the regular PL-15.
Sky Dragon 30 (SD-30)
Surface-to-air missile based on the PL-15. The missile features a fuselage similar to that of PL-15, with a modular seeker head that can be switched from the PL-15's active radar seeker or the PL-10's imaging infrared (IIR) seeker.
LD-8A
Anti-radiation missile derived from the PL-15, with a specialized anti-radar seeker.

== Operators ==
China

- People's Liberation Army Air Force: PL-15
- People's Liberation Army Naval Air Force: PL-15

Pakistan

- Pakistan Air Force: PL-15/PL-15E

== See also ==
- PL-10
- PL-12
- PL-17
- PL-21

Related development

- PL-16

=== Missiles of similar role, configuration, and era ===
- AIM-174B – (United States)
- AIM-260 JATM – (United States)
- Meteor – (France, United Kingdom, Italy, Germany, Spain, Sweden)
