= Miniature Self-Defense Missile =

AFRL future self defense system for aircraft

The Miniature Self-Defense Missile (MSDM) is a US Air Force concept for a weapon designed to take out anti-aircraft missiles. Lacking a warhead, it requires a direct impact to destroy its target. It was first announced in 2015 and is being developed by Raytheon with first fly test expected by 2023.

== Similar projects ==
- Hard Kill Self Protection Countermeasure System (HKSPCS) (US Navy)
- Hard Kill Defensive Aid System (HK-DAS) (MBDA)
