= PL-21 =

Chinese beyond-visual-range air-to-air missile

- Type: Beyond-visual-range air-to-air missile
- Place of origin: People's Republic of China

Specifications
- Length: 4 m (13 ft)
- Operational range: 300–400 km
- Guidance system: Active radar

The PL-21 or PL-XX is an under development active radar-guided beyond-visual-range air-to-air missile by the People's Republic of China.

== Development and history ==
The PL-21 is estimated to have a range of 300 to 400 kilometers. and powered by a ramjet engine.

== See also ==
- Gökhan (missile) – (Turkey)
- AIM-260 JATM – (United States)
- Meteor – (France, United Kingdom, Italy, Germany, Spain, Sweden)
- Long-Range Engagement Weapon – (United States)
- R-37 (missile) – (Russia)
- PL-15 – (China)
- PL-17 – (China)

Related lists

- List of missiles

== Sources ==
- Barrie, Douglas; Thornley, Ben (May 2024). "Waiting in the Wings: The Asia-Pacific Air-to-air Challenge" (PDF). Asia-Pacific Regional Security Assessment 2024. International Institute for Strategic Studies. ISBN 978-1-003-53006-0.
- Wood, Peter; Yang, David; Cliff, Roger (November 2020). Air-to-Air Missiles: Capabilities And Development in China (PDF). Montgomery: China Aerospace Studies Institute. ISBN 9798574996270. Archived (PDF) from the original on 9 February 2022.
