= AIM-174B Gunslinger =

American very long-range air-to-air missile

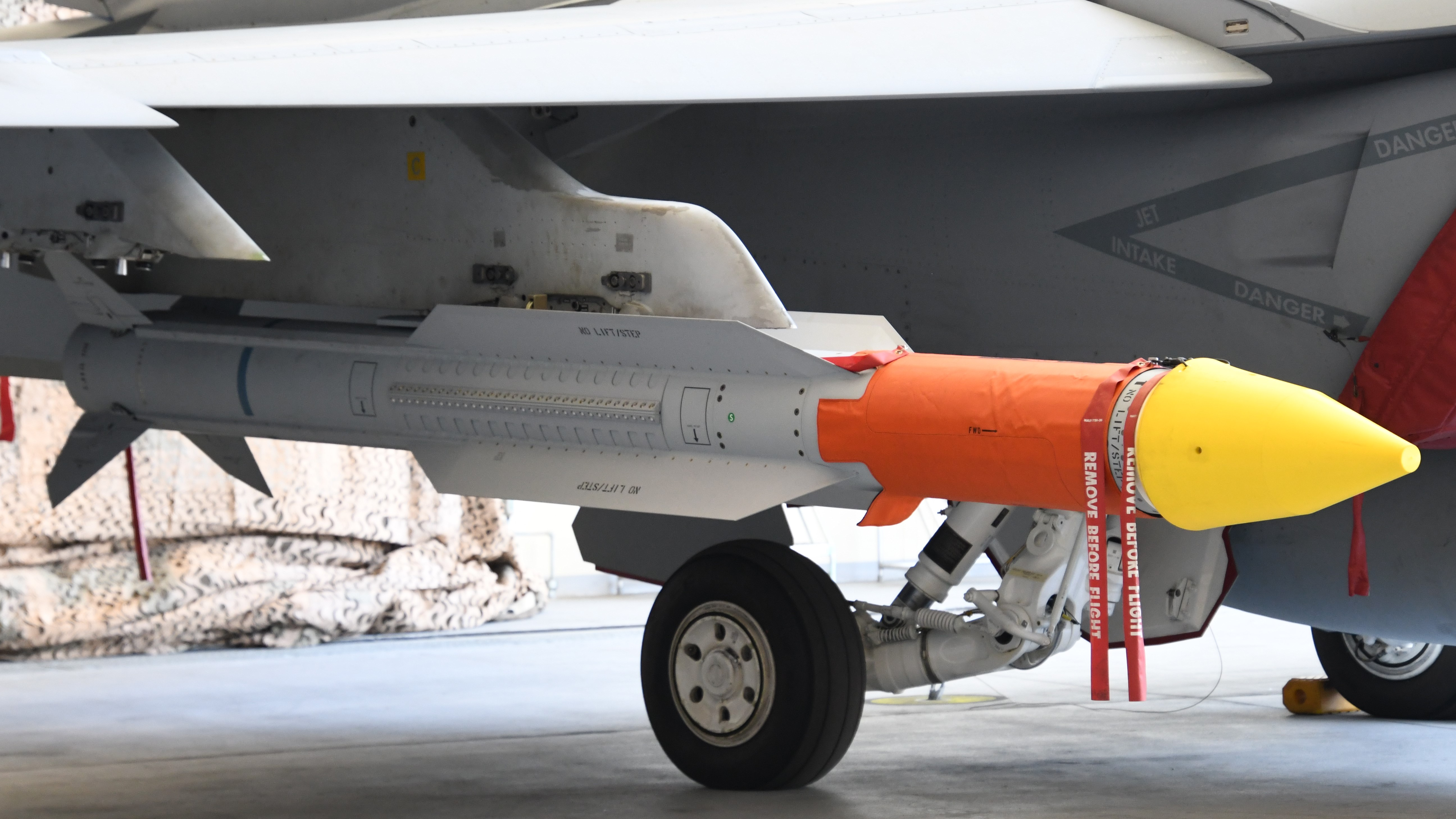
- AIM-174 missile on an F/A-18F, 4 May 2025
- Type: Very long-range air-to-air missile: Secondary air-to-ground and anti-ship missile roles (speculated)
- Place of origin: United States of America

Service history
- In service: 2021(?)–present; Testing may have begun as early as 2015
- Used by: United States Navy

Production history
- Manufacturer: Raytheon

Specifications
- Mass: 1,830 lb (830 kg)
- Length: 16.5 ft (5.0 m)
- Diameter: 13.5 in (0.34 m)
- Wingspan: 62.0 in (1.57 m)
- Warhead: High-explosive blast-fragmentation
- Warhead weight: 140 lb (64 kg)
- Detonation mechanism: Radar and contact/impact/proximity fuze
- Engine: Solid-fuel rocket motor
- Operational range: 150–250 mi (240–400 km)+
- Maximum speed: Mach 3.5 (2,664.2 mph; 4,287.7 km/h; 1.2 km/s)
- Guidance system: Inertial guidance, terminal active and semi-active radar homing
- Launch platform: Boeing F/A-18E/F Super Hornet

The AIM-174B Gunslinger is a very long-range air-to-air missile (AAM) developed by U.S. defense contractor Raytheon and currently used by the United States Navy (USN). The AIM-174B is a derivative of the RIM-174B Standard Extended Range Active Missile (ERAM, Standard Missile-6, or SM-6) surface-to-air missile, a member of the extended Standard Missile family, with the USN describing the AIM-174B as the "Air-Launched Configuration" of the SM-6. The AIM-174B's existence was first revealed publicly in July 2024 at RIMPAC 2024 and has been confirmed to be capable of being carried and launched only by the Boeing F/A-18E/F Super Hornet.

Described as a "massive" AAM, the Gunslinger has a confirmed range of 150 miles (130 nmi; 240 km), though it is widely speculated that the range may be much greater.

In addition to the AIM-174's air-to-air role, the Gunslinger is believed capable of engaging other missiles (including ballistic missiles and hypersonic weapons), and may also serve as an air-to-ground and anti-ship missile.

== History ==
Since the 2004 retirement of the AIM-54 Phoenix AAM, the USN has not fielded a dedicated long-range air-to-air missile. There had been speculation about the AIM-174's existence since at least 2021, with photos of SM-6s carried by Super Hornets making their way online. The publication Naval News reported that they were following developments of an "air-launched SM-6" since 2015, while The Aviationist reported that photos of Super Hornets carrying "an SM-6 variant" appeared in 2018. Aviation Weekly reported the "RIM-174/SM-6" being "integrated" into the Super Hornet platform in April 2021.

It is speculated that the AIM-174 was developed as a special access program, similar to the AIM-260 Joint Advanced Tactical Missile (of which little is officially known). As the AIM-260 is similarly a very long-range air-to-air missile, it is unclear what the relationship between the AIM-174B and AIM-260 will be, as the USN has co-operated with the United States Air Force (USAF) in developing the latter for use by both services. Both missiles are designed to counter the extreme-range air-to-air missiles being fielded or under-development by the United States' peer and near-peer potential adversaries, such as the Russian Vympel R-37M or the Chinese PL-21. Both the AIM-174 and -260 are separate from the currently under-development Long-Range Engagement Weapon of the USAF.

In May 2025, the USN "playbook" Naval Aviation 2025 revealed that the official nickname for the AIM-174B is "Gunslinger".

The Gunslinger has armed only USN F/A-18E/F Super Hornets, though there is speculation that other airframes could mount the weapon, such as the USAF's McDonnell Douglas F-15E Strike Eagle, Boeing F-15EX Eagle II, Boeing B-52 Stratofortress, or the Northrop Grumman B-21 Raider. The Gunslinger has been deployed operationally to four USN Nimitz-class supercarriers as of November 2026; the USS Carl Vinson (CVN-70), USS George Washington (CVN-73), USS Abraham Lincoln (CVN-72), and the USS George H. W. Bush (CVN-77).

== Design ==
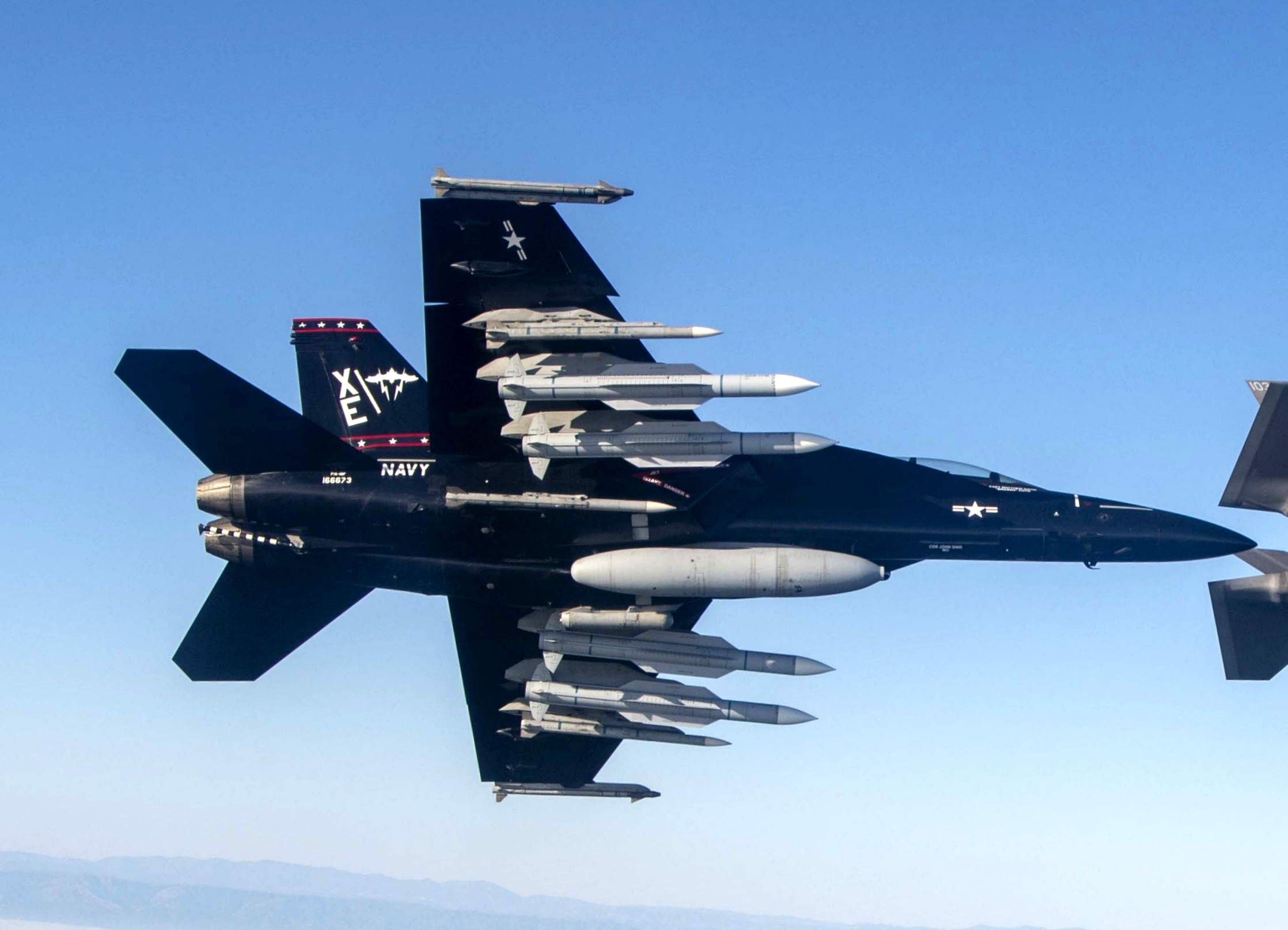
A F/A-18F armed with four Gunslingers, three AMRAAMs, two AIM-9Xs, an IRST21 sensor mounted in an FPU-13/A drop tank, and an AN/ASQ-228 ATFLIR pod

Photos reveal that the Gunslinger is externally virtually identical to the RIM-174, apart from the marked lack of the solid-fuel rocket Mk 72 booster on the AIM-174. The missile will likely utilize a Mk 104 solid-fuel rocket engine, as carried by the RIM-174. The Gunslinger may also employ warheads capable of "area effects". The "standard" warhead is 140 lb (64 kg) and consists of a high-explosive charge with blast-fragmentation properties, and is over three times the weight of an AIM-120 AMRAAM warhead, and seven times the weight of an AIM-9X Sidewinder warhead.

Variously described as a "large" and "outsized" weapon, the Gunslinger is 1,900 lb (860 kg), nearly double the weight of the AIM-54C Phoenix, and is over five times heavier than the AIM-120 AMRAAM.

The Gunslinger is capable of speeds of at least Mach 3.5 (2,660 miles per hour; 4,290 kilometres per hour; 1.19 kilometres per second).

In September 2024, photos emerged of a F/A-18F Super Hornet of the VX-9 'Vampires' carrying four AIM-174Bs, three AIM-120 AMRAAMs, two AIM-9Xs, an IRST21 sensor mounted in an FPU-13/A drop tank, and an AN/ASQ-228 ATFLIR pod simultaneously.

== Range and use ==
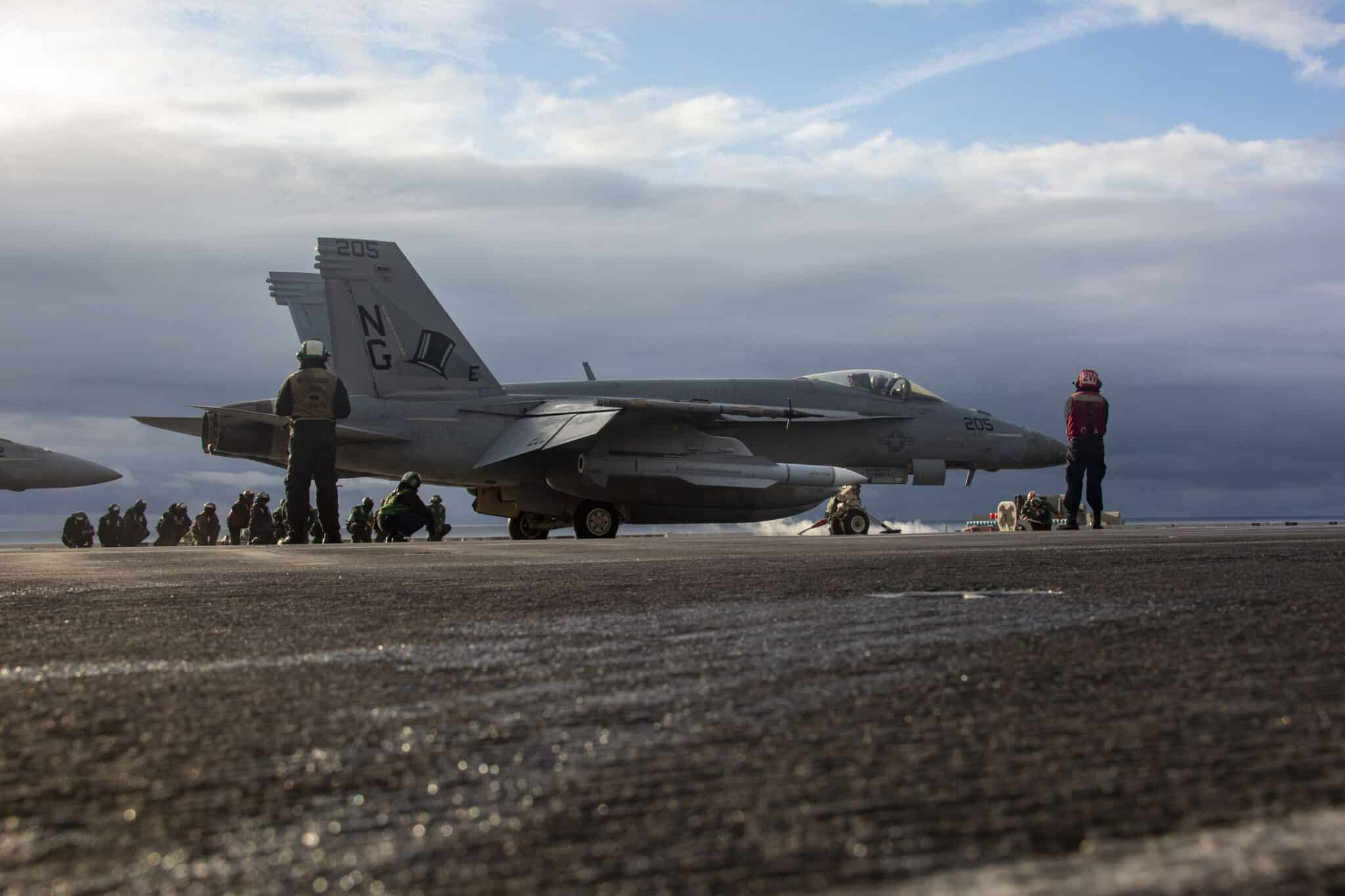
An F/A-18E Super Hornet equipped with CATM-174Bs (the training-simulator variant of the Gunslinger missile) prepares to take-off from the USS Abraham Lincoln (CVN-72)

While details regarding the AIM-174's range are vague, certain surface-launched RIM-174 variants are capable of about 290 mi (250 nmi; 470 km) launches; with the benefit of being launched at speed and higher altitude (where the air is "thinner" and thus induces less drag), the AIM-174's range may extend hundreds of miles though the USN has only confirmed a range of 130 nmi (150 mi; 240 km). Estimates of the Gunslinger's maximum range are around 250 mi (220 nmi; 400 km) to 300 mi (260 nmi; 480 km).

While the AIM-174 lacks the SM-6's Mk 72 rocket booster, in the thinner air of higher-altitudes (relative to a surface launch) and retaining the speed of the launching aircraft (several hundred miles per hour, at minimum), an air-launched AIM-174 may be capable of extreme ranges (300–400+ kilometres), relative to other air-launched missiles. The AIM-174 may also be capable of "lofting," a technique whereby the launched missile immediately ascends upwards to attain altitudes generally between 80,000 ft (24,384 m) to 100,000 ft (30,480 m) in order to take advantage of the even thinner air, relative to typical flight altitudes. Such a launch profile can greatly extend missile ranges. The AIM-174's predecessor, the AIM-54 Phoenix BVRAAM, was capable of employing lofting (along with certain AIM-7 Sparrow variants and all AIM-120 AMRAAM variants). Between the AIM-174's advantages over a surface-launched SM-6 and the possibility of lofted-launch profiles, the AIM-174's range may extend to hundreds of nautical miles. The USN also routinely understates the publicly-available ranges and capabilities of weapon systems for strategic security purposes. At minimum, the AIM-174 represents a roughly 30% increase in range over the 99 nmi (114 mi; 184 km) of the retired AIM-54C and a roughly 50% increase over the 87 nmi (100 mi; 161 km) of the in-service AIM-120D AMRAAM.

Very long-range AAMs such as the extant R-37M and the nascent PL-21 are typically intended for use against large airborne targets. As such, it is speculated that the AIM-174 could be used offensively to strike at tankers or airborne early warning aircraft and electronic warfare aircraft far behind the "frontlines" or defensively to strike large bombers — such as China's Xi'an H-6 — threatening USN fleets.

As the RIM-174/SM-6 is capable of anti-ship and anti-ground strikes, the possibility exists for the AIM-174 to be utilized in such capacities. Derived from the SM-6 family — whose variants are capable of anti-ship missile defense and anti-ballistic missile launches — the AIM-174 will likely retain such anti-missile capabilities. The United States Missile Defense Agency has also indicated that the Gunslinger has "counter-hypersonic missile" capabilities.

== Variants ==
- YAIM-174 (prototype)
- XAIM-174 (experimental, utilized for initial testing)
- NAIM-174 (equipped with various sensors to transmit data relevant to the missile's use)
- AIM-174B (only known operational variant)
- CATM-174B (inert training variant with guidance electronics; no warhead or motor)
- DATM-174B (inert training "dummy" variant with no motor, warhead, or guidance electronics)

== Specifications (AIM-174B) ==
- Range: At least 150 mi (130 nmi; 241 km), estimated to be beyond 250 mi (217 nmi; 402 km)
- Airspeed: Up to Mach 3.5 (2,664.2 mph; 4,287.7 km/h; 1.2 km/s)
- Warhead Weight: 140 lb (63.50 kg)
- Overall Weight: 1,830 lb (830.07 kg)
- Length: 16.5 ft (502.92 cm; 5.03 m)
- Diameter: 13.5 in (34.29 cm; 0.34 m)
- Wingspan: 61.8 in (156.97 cm; 1.57 m)

== See also ==
=== Missiles of similar role, configuration, and era ===
- AIM-424 LRAAM – (United States)
- AAM-4TDR – (Japan)
- Meteor – (France, United Kingdom, Italy, Germany, Spain, Sweden)
- Astra – (India)
- PL-15 – (China)
- PL-17 – (China)
- R-37 – (Russia)

Related lists

- List of missiles
- Longbow (ALBM)
- WS-121B Longbow
