= AIM-260 JATM =

American future air-to-air missile

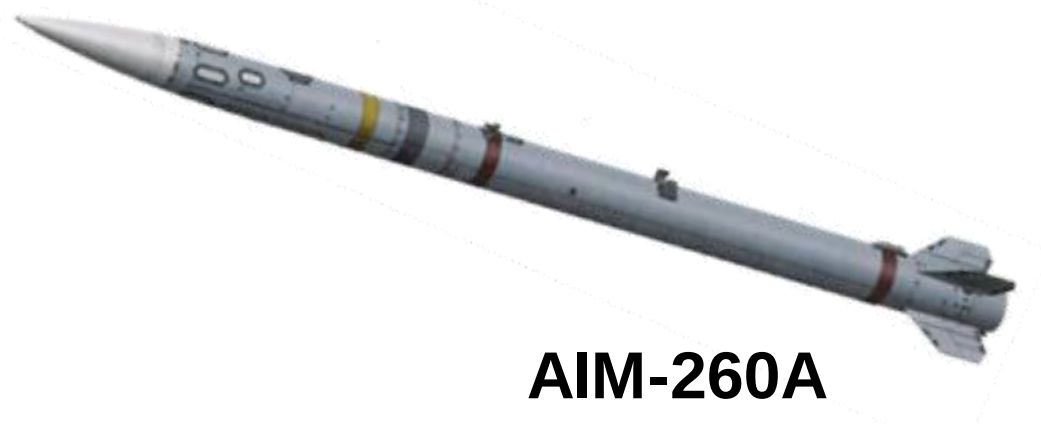
- Rendering of the AIM-260A JATM
- Type: Beyond-visual-range air-to-air missile
- Place of origin: United States

Production history
- Designer: Lockheed Martin
- Produced: 2024–present

Specifications
- Maximum firing range: At least 200 km (120 mi)
- Warhead: High explosive blast-fragmentation
- Maximum speed: Mach 5
- Launch platform: Aircraft: Lockheed Martin F-22 Raptor; Boeing F/A-18E/F Super Hornet; Lockheed Martin F-35 Lightning II; Boeing F-15EX Eagle II

The AIM-260 Joint Advanced Tactical Missile (JATM) is an American beyond-visual-range (BVR) missile being developed and produced by Lockheed Martin. Designed to address advanced threats, the missile is expected to replace or supplement the AIM-120 AMRAAM currently in US service. The United States Department of Defense (DoD) considers the AIM-260A JATM program to be the number one air-delivered weapon priority for both the United States Air Force (USAF) and the Navy (USN); and its acquisition out-prioritizes other weapon system improvements and modernization efforts on any fielded aircraft.

This program differs from the Long-Range Engagement Weapon being developed by Raytheon and the Navy's possibly related AIM-424 Malice, currently in flight-testing. The JATM is also separate from the AIM-174B Gunslinger, also developed by Raytheon for the USN. Australia is to also be the first foreign country to procure the missile, with deliveries expected in 2033.

== Development ==
Initial launch platforms were expected to be, and currently are, the USAF F-22 Raptor and the USN F/A-18E/F Super Hornet, with integration with the F-35 Lightning II and F-15EX Eagle II being planned afterwards.

The AIM-260 program began in 2017 in response to long-range missiles developed by potential adversaries, specifically the Chinese PL-15. Full scale aerial target testing for the JATM was confirmed to have started as early as April 2020, and testing in general for the missile is currently in progress. It is yet to achieve initial operational capability (IOC). AIM-260 production is expected to overtake AIM-120 production by 2026.

Development of the missile has been highly classified; it is a Special Access Program. In FY 2020, the U.S. Air Force appropriated $6.5 million for the construction of a custom storage vault at Hill AFB specifically for the JATM, citing the classified nature of the program. An official Request for Information (RFI) was issued in 2020, relating to the Long Range Air-to-Air Technology (LRAAT) program was subsequently issued to gather industry input on advanced missile capabilities and future development requirements relating to the JATM. According to the Naval Air Warfare Center Weapons Division (NAWCWD) 2023 fact sheet there is a new design of solid rocket fuel grains which allows to fit more propellant in a smaller volume enabling 1.5x greater range.

In November 2021, it was revealed that the missile would have similar dimensions to the AIM-120 in order to ensure maximum compatibility with prior launch platform technology. This would ensure compatibility with the F-22, which would allow for a decrease in the U.S. Air Force's fleet of F-22s due to the increase in combat effectiveness. The exact range of the JATM is classified, as is that of its predecessor the AIM-120D-3 variant of the AMRAAM, but defense analysts expect it to outrange the AIM-120D-3 ranging 75–100 miles. According to defense editor Steve Trimble, of Aviation Week, "We've seen charts for the Air Force range requirements for Eglin Air Force Base showing circles for the test area for AMRAAM and the test area for the JATM... the AIM-260 missile has a range circle that's roughly double the size of the AMRAAM circle." Raytheon has suggested that with the range enhancements of the AIM-120D-3, it would serve as a complement to the JATM; the JATM would be an expensive "kick-the-door-down" weapon while the AMRAAM D3 would be a more affordable capacity missile.

On 2 May 2023, Secretary of the Air Force Frank Kendall told the Senate Armed Services Committee that JATM would "hopefully" enter production that year, as well as confirming that the JATM was expected to arm the Air Force's upcoming unmanned Collaborative Combat Aircraft. According to Air Force Major Kevin Autrey, the lead F-22 Raptor operational test pilot with the 422nd Test and Evaluation Squadron at Nellis Air Force Base in Nevada, live-fire testing of the AIM-260 was slated to begin in summer 2023.

In May 2024, the House Armed Services Committee was investigating whether more late-variant AMRAAMs would be required in light of the AIM-260 JATM not having entered full-scale production, despite the USAF having previously stated in March 2023 that AIM-260 development and production was on-schedule.

On 26 June 2025, the US military released FY2026 budget, and USAF and USN both requested in total $670.5 million for the AIM-260 JATM procurement and additional $687 million for the ongoing development of the JATM missile.

On 15 October 2025, Air & Space Forces magazine was told by a top service official that JATM is not yet operational, citing issues with "integration" of the weapon on USAF's fifth-generation fighters, the F-22 and F-35. Another official disputed those comments, though, and said the program is "progressing well", though he acknowledged that it has missed its intended IOC date. The missile has been in test since 2020; the first platform planned to use it will be the F-22.

On 13 May 2026, photos emerged of a F/A-18F of VX-31 carrying what is believed to be a live AIM-260A JATM missile. An Australian F/A-18F was photographed carrying one of the missiles in September 2026.

== Future operators ==
United States

- United States Air Force
- United States Navy

Australia

- Royal Australian Air Force

== See also ==
- AIM-160 SACM

Related lists

- List of missiles

=== Missiles of similar role, configuration, and era ===
- Meteor – (France, United Kingdom, Italy, Germany, Spain, Sweden)
- PL-15 – (China)
- PL-17 – (China)
