= Diamondback (missile) =

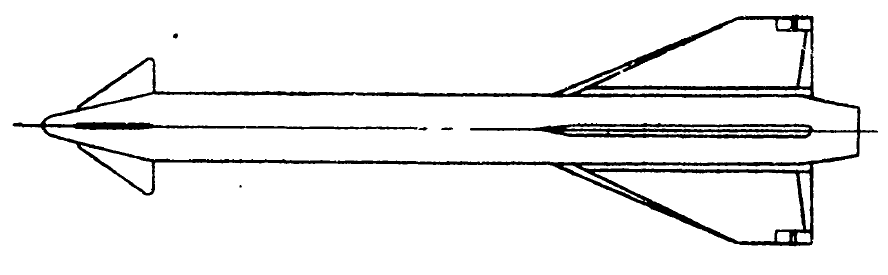
- Type: Air-to-air missile
- Place of origin: United States

Service history
- Used by: United States Navy

Production history
- Designed: 1956-1957
- Manufacturer: Naval Ordnance Test Station
- No. built: 0

Specifications
- Mass: 850 pounds (390 kg)
- Length: 12.3 feet (3.76 m)
- Diameter: 12 inches (300 mm)
- Wingspan: 40 inches (1,000 mm)
- Warhead: Nuclear warhead
- Blast yield: 0.75 kilotons of TNT (3.1 TJ)
- Engine: Dual-thrust rocket
- Propellant: Liquid fuel UDMH/RFNA
- Operational range: 15 to 20 miles (24 to 32 km)
- Flight ceiling: 80,000 feet (24,000 m)
- Maximum speed: Mach 3+
- Guidance system: Infrared seeker/passive radar guidance

The Diamondback was a proposed nuclear-armed air-to-air missile studied by the United States Navy's Naval Ordnance Test Station during the 1950s. Intended as an enlarged, nuclear-armed version of the successful Sidewinder missile, Diamondback did not progress beyond the study stage.

== Development history ==
In 1956, studies began at the Naval Ordnance Test Station (NOTS) at China Lake, California involving an advanced development of the AAM-N-7 (later AIM-9) Sidewinder air-to-air missile, which was then entering service with the United States Navy. Originally known as "Super Sidewinder", the program soon gained the name "Diamondback", continuing China Lake's theme of naming heat-seeking missiles after pit vipers.

Diamondback was intended to provide increased speed, range and accuracy over that achieved by Sidewinder. The missile's design called for it to be armed with either a powerful continuous-rod warhead or a low-yield nuclear warhead, the latter developed by China Lake's Special Weapons Division, and which would have a yield of less than 1 kiloton of TNT (4.2 TJ).

The propulsion system was intended to be a liquid-fueled, dual-thrust rocket, using hypergolic, storable propellants. The rocket motor planned for use in the Diamondback missile was based on that developed by NOTS for the Liquid Propellant Aircraft Rocket (LAR) project.

Although the design studies were promising, the Navy did not have a requirement for a missile of this sort. As a result, the Diamondback project was dropped; studies came to a halt around 1958, while by the early 1960s the project was considered "inactive" and was allowed to fade into history.
