= Sidearm =

Sidearm, side-arm or Side Arm(s) may refer to:

- Sidearm (weapon), a backup weapon
- Sidearm (baseball), a baseball throwing technique
- Sidearm, a flying disc (Frisbee) throw
- Hyper Dyne Side Arms, a 1986 arcade game
- AGM-122 Sidearm, a missile
- Side-arm flask (Büchner flask), a type of laboratory glassware
