= MAA-1 Piranha =

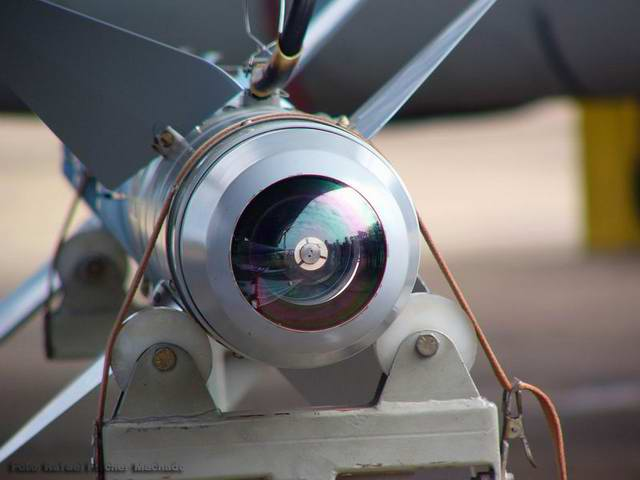
- MAA-1A
- Type: Short-range air-to-air missile
- Place of origin: Brazil

Service history
- Used by: Brazilian Air Force; Brazilian Navy; Colombian Air Force; Pakistan Air Force

Production history
- Manufacturer: Mectron
- Unit cost: U$ 29.000

Specifications
- Mass: 194 lb (88,0 kg)
- Length: 114,16 in (2 900 mm)
- Diameter: 6 in (152 mm)
- Wingspan: 27 in (661 mm)
- Detonation mechanism: Laser proximity fuse
- Engine: Solid-fuel rocket
- Propellant: Solid fuel
- Guidance system: Infrared homing
- Launch platform: Aircraft

The MAA-1 Piranha is a short-range infrared homing missile and the first air-to-air missile developed by Brazil for its Air Force and Navy. It was designed to replace the AIM-9 Sidewinder missile in Brazilian service and has since been exported to Colombia and Pakistan.

== History ==
Development of an air-to-air missile to replace the AIM-9B Sidewinder in FAB service began in March 1976 by Brazil's Instituto de Aeronáutica e Espaço (IAE). By 1978 it had been defined as a weapon similar in capability to the AIM-9G. The project was classified until 1981. The pace of the project was quickened after the 1982 Falklands war and the missile was dubbed Piranha. Contracts were awarded to DF Vasconcellos SA, a Brazilian company with experience in optics and guided weaponry which was given the task of developing the weapon's infra-red seeker. However the company went bankrupt in the mid-1980s and it abandoned the Piranha project in 1986.

Piranha achieved some degree of operational capability in September 1992. It has been assumed that the missile achieved initial operational capability in 1993 coinciding with the last test campaign. The MAA-1 project has been handled by many Brazilian companies since its inception in the 1970s, but ultimately Mectron developed the MAA-1 missile weapon system in the 1990s.

In 2005 a South African Skua high-speed target drone was used in final testing of the MAA-1 in order to simulate an aircraft by towing infrared targets at high speed.

== Design ==
The MAA-1 Piranha is a supersonic, short-range air-to-air missile relying on infrared passive guidance that senses the heat emissions coming primarily from a target aircraft's engines. It is highly maneuverable and can turn at accelerations of up to 50g. The Piranha is a 'fire and forget' missile: once launched it does not require data from the firing aircraft; a laser fuze detonates the high-explosive warhead. The missile is suitable for tactical aerial "dogfight" combat.

During the 1990s Mectron conducted Piranha missile test firings on the AT-26 Xavante, F-5 and Mirage III aircraft. The missile was qualified for operation on the Brazilian Air Force (FAB) F-5E in September 1992. Missile production began in 1993y. The Piranha air-to-air missile has also been integrated into Brazilian AMX tactical attack aircraft, and could be integrated into many other aircraft used by the Brazilian Air Force, Army and Navy in the near future.

The MAA-1 Piranha can be fired by the F-103E IIIEBR (Mirage III), F-5E Tiger II, A-1 AMX, A-29 Super Tucano, AT-26 Xavante (tests) and possibly the AF-1 Hawks Navy and the "new" FAB Mirage 2000C.

The missile uses a Mectron "passive infrared seeker all-aspect" sensor, similar to the U.S. AIM-9L.

The technical specifications of the manufacturer advises that the missile is able to "pull" to 50 G's (capacity of the cell), has an infrared detector InSb scan cone-cooled gas, with scanning speed 35° and view angle of 37°. The G-load is more indicative of the strength of the cell as the missile does not have a narrow turning radius. To achieve a turning radius that would create a 50-G load would require a sophisticated digital autopilot and would only be possible when the rocket motor is burning.

The target may acquired in standalone mode or allocated by the radar, HUD or crosshairs on the helmet (which means some off-boresight capacity). Radar acquisition of the target is particularly useful when visibility is low, as at night.

The CTA data indicate maximum g-load of 45 g's, a turning speed at or above 20 degrees per second and maximum angle of screening more than 30 degrees. Another source says that the CTA is also developing an infrared sensor capable of trapping front for future versions. This means that the missile is not "all-aspect" and can only engage targets when fired towards the rear of the aircraft. This data may refer to older models.

The warhead is a blast fragmentation type with HMX explosives and weighs 12 kg (20 kg in the original model). A proximity fuze is laser-active timer with fuze and impact.

The rocket motor has a burn time of 2.1 seconds, a maximum thrust of 27,000 newtons and can accelerate the Piranha missile up to Mach 2. The motor uses a smokeless propellant. The theoretical range is 8–10 km (4–6 km in early versions from the 70's and 80's). The mission time is 40 seconds.

Navigation is by proportional navigation with pneumatic actuator and "canards" for steering control. The scroll control and stabilization is by "rollerons" in stabilizers. The Piranha has achieved the design parameters of the first phase was to overcome the AIM-9B. In the second phase of the project the goal was to overcome the AIM-9E

== MAA-1B ==
MAA-1B Piranha
- Type: Short-range air-to-air missile
- Place of origin: Brazil

Service history
- Used by: Brazilian Air Force; Brazilian Navy

Production history
- Manufacturer: Mectron
- Unit cost: $250-300k
- Produced: 2013- (scheduled)

Specifications
- Length: 2.738 metres (107.8 in)
- Wingspan: 0.64 metres (25 in)
- Detonation mechanism: Laser proximity fuse
- Engine: Solid-fuel rocket
- Operational range: ~12 km
- Guidance system: Infrared homing
- Launch platform: Combat aircraft

While the MAA-1A Piranha is in service, the MAA-1B Piranha is a 4th-generation air-to-air missile produced by Mectron under joint venture program with Airbus Defence and Space. The project is at final stage of development under qualification phase, with over 40 guided flights completed by April 2012. Production was expected to begin in 2013.

=== Development ===
The new missile will equip the Brazilian Air Force's F-5M, AMX A-1M and Super Tucano aircraft.

The missile is fitted with a dual-color seeker, featuring 70-degree look angle with 40 degrees per second track rate, and a 50% longer range, as well as maneuverability improvements achieved by changing the original missile's flight controls aerodynamics. The MAA-1B is capable of being appointed by the aircraft's radar or the HMD helmet.

=== Piranha missile ===
The Mectron / CTA / IAE / Avibras presented a new set of air-air missile MAA-1B (Bravo) during LAAD 2007. The missile uses the main structure of the fuselage, the warhead and proximity fuze and impact of the MAA-1A (Alpha), the rest being completely new. The new dual-band sensor (UV and IR) has 80% of nationalization, with great capability against countermeasures, high off-boresight capability (up to 90 degrees) with a very high speed browser and can be pointed at the target by radar at the pilot's helmet or perform autonomous search. The autopilot is programmed to monitor the type "lag pursuit" in a frontal engagement similar to the Python-4.

The canard configuration is of type double, composed of four fixed canards, followed by four mobile canards and two fins to control longitudinal spin. The withdrawal of rollerons suggests that the missile has a digital autopilot system that is necessary for high-speed missiles. The actuator has twice the power of the actuators of the Alpha model and can pull 60 g's. The engine will have new propellant "smokeless" increased the range up to 50% with boost from two stages that burn for six seconds instead of two seconds of the MAA-1A Piranha. The pilot can choose the type of mode of operation according to the threat, optimizing performance for each target. The length and diameter were kept, but the weight increased a little. The software will be different for the F-5em not perceive it as being a MOR-1A and not enjoy its full capacity. The infrared thermographic camera sensor of Indium antimonide and lead telluride has six elements with large search range. The missile can be considered the Fourth Generation, regarded by experts as superior to the Russian R-73 but less than the Israeli Python IV, with much lower price than similar ones on the market. The estimated cost is $250–300 thousand.

The period of development was much faster in the light of lessons learned from the MAA-1A Piranha. The project was started in 2005 with the pre-series production is planned for the second half of 2008, with testing and approval by the end of 2008. The operation is scheduled for 2009. Project MAA-1B received a budget of $3 million in 2006. Also in 2006 was completed the eighth stage of the project (11 in total). The conclusion of the eleventh phase is expected for October 2008.

In November 2008, three ground firing trial were conducted at Avibras facility, the tests were part of the stage of proof requirements and were successful. The improvement of the propulsion system of the missile is being conducted jointly by the IAE (Institute of Aeronautics and Space), and Mectron, Avibrás.

== Operators ==
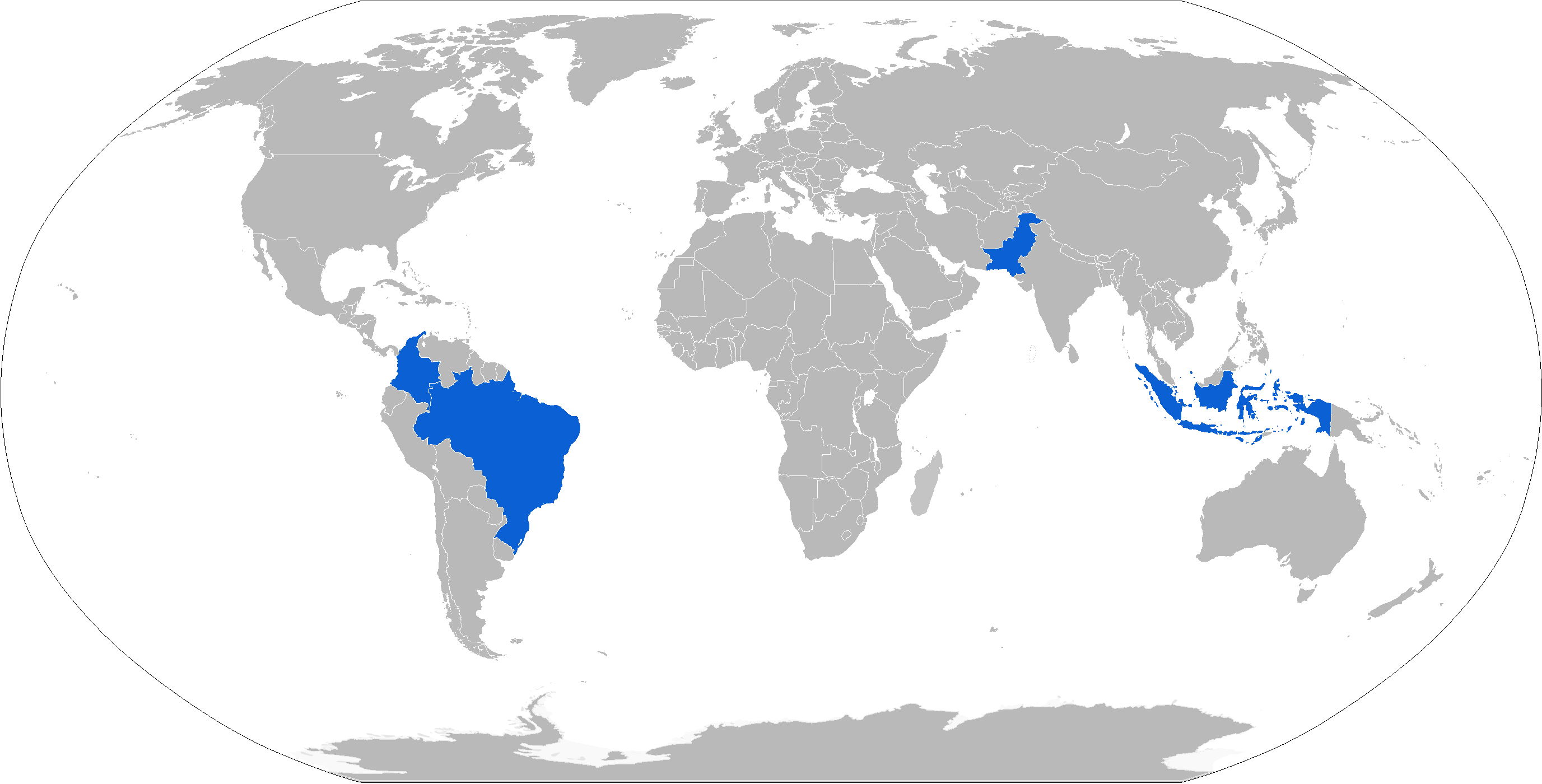
Map with MAA-1 operators in blue

=== Current operators ===
Brazil

- Brazilian Air Force
- Brazilian Naval Aviation

Colombia

- Colombian Air Force

Ecuador

- Ecuadorian Air Force

Pakistan

- Pakistan Air Force

== See also ==
=== Similar Weapons ===
- Vympel R-73 – (Soviet Union)
- Python IV – (Israel)
