= AIM-9 Sidewinder =

American short-range air-to-air missile

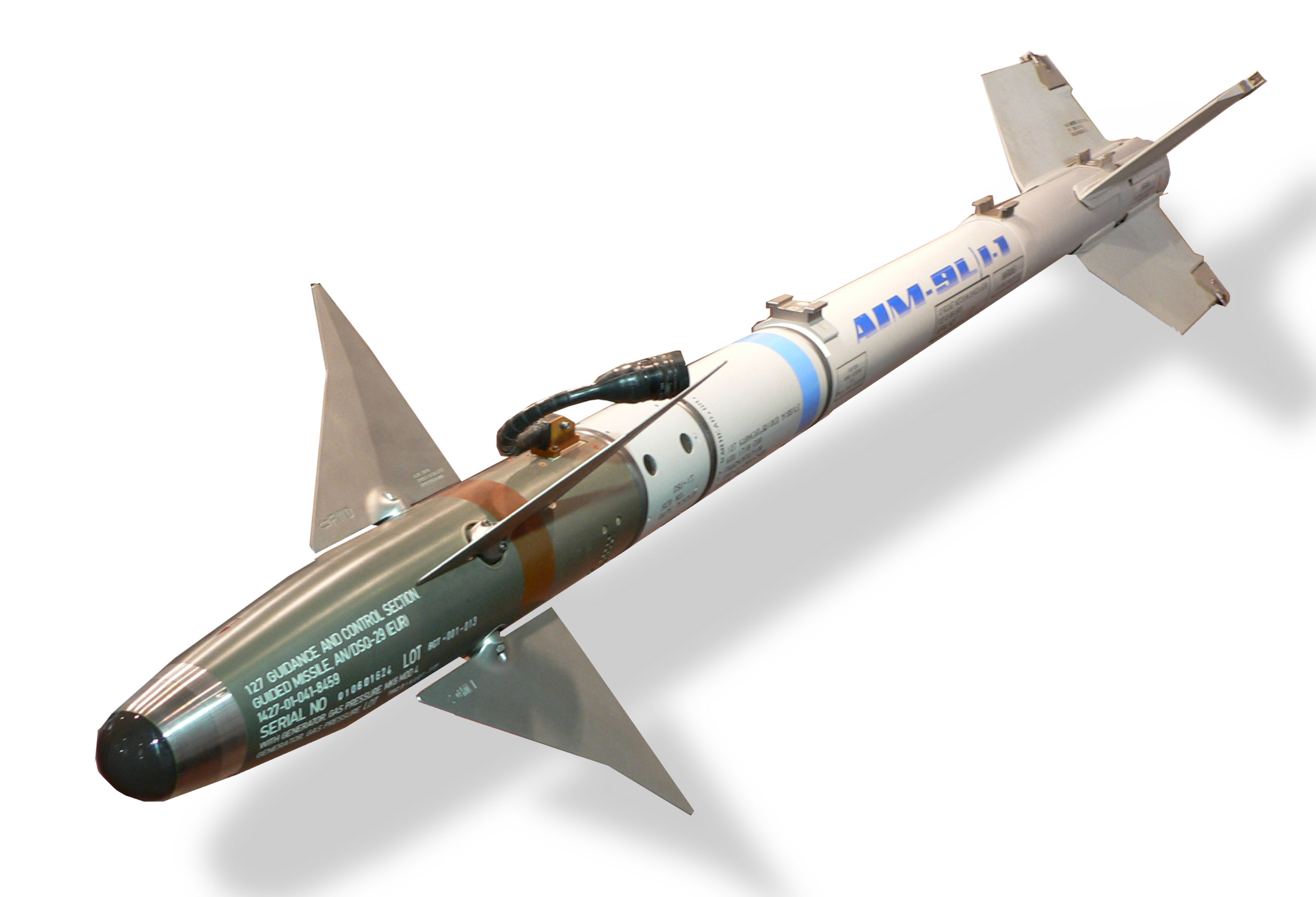
- AIM-9L/I-1
- Type: Short-range air-to-air missile
- Place of origin: United States

Service history
- In service: 1956–present
- Used by: See Operators
- Wars: Second Taiwan Strait Crisis; Vietnam War; Yom Kippur War; Iran–Iraq War; Gulf of Sidra incident (1981); Falklands War 1982 Lebanon War; 1989 air battle near Tobruk; Gulf War; Bosnian War; Operation Allied Force; 2023 Chinese balloon incident; Gaza war; Red Sea crisis; Russian invasion of Ukraine; 2026 Iran War

Production history
- Manufacturer: Raytheon Company; Ford Aerospace; Loral Corp. Nammo
- Unit cost: US$381,069.74 (Block II); US$399,500.00 (Block II Plus); US$209,492.75 (training missile) (All as of 2019)
- Produced: 1953–present

Specifications
- Mass: 188 pounds (85.3 kg)
- Length: 9 feet 11 inches (3.02 m)
- Diameter: 5 in (127.0 mm)
- Wingspan: 11 in (279.4 mm)
- Warhead: WDU-17/B annular blast-fragmentation
- Warhead weight: 20.8 lb (9.4 kg)
- Detonation mechanism: IR proximity fuze
- Engine: Hercules/Bermite Mk. 36 solid-fuel rocket
- Operational range: 0.6 to 22 miles (1.0 to 35.4 km)
- Maximum speed: Mach 2.5+
- Guidance system: Imaging infrared homing, 128×128 element focal plane array (AIM-9X), Infrared homing (most models), Semi-active radar homing (AIM-9C)
- Launch platform: Aircraft, naval vessels, fixed launchers, and ground vehicles

The AIM-9 Sidewinder is a short-range air-to-air missile. It entered service with the United States Navy in 1956 and the Air Force in 1964, and is one of the oldest, cheapest, and most successful air-to-air missiles. Its latest variants (AIM-9X) remain standard equipment in most Western-aligned air forces. The Soviet K-13 (AA-2 "Atoll"), a reverse-engineered copy of the AIM-9B, was also widely adopted.

Low-level development started in the late 1940s, emerging in the early 1950s as a guidance system for the modular Zuni rocket. This modularity allowed for the introduction of newer seekers and rocket motors, including the AIM-9C variant, which used semi-active radar homing and served as the basis of the AGM-122 Sidearm anti-radar missile. Due to the Sidewinder's infrared guidance system, the brevity code "Fox two" is used when firing the AIM-9. Originally a tail-chasing system, early models saw extensive use during the Vietnam War, but had a low success rate (8% hit rate with the AIM-9E variant). This led to all-aspect capability in the L (Lima) version, which proved an effective weapon during the 1982 Falklands War and Operation Mole Cricket 19 in Lebanon. Its adaptability has kept it in service over newer designs like the AIM-95 Agile and SRAAM that were intended to replace it.

The Sidewinder is the most widely used air-to-air missile in the West, with more than 110,000 missiles produced for the U.S. and 27 other nations, of which perhaps one percent have been used in combat. It has been built under license by Sweden and other nations. The AIM-9 has an estimated 270 aircraft kills.

In 2010, Boeing won a contract to support Sidewinder operations through to 2055. In 2021 an Air Force spokesperson said that its relatively low cost, versatility, and reliability mean it is "very possible that the Sidewinder will remain in Air Force inventories through the late 21st century".

== Design ==
The AIM-9 was a product of the US Naval Weapons Center at China Lake in the Mojave Desert. It features a lightweight, compact design with cruciform canards and tail fins. It uses a solid rocket motor for propulsion, similar to most conventional missiles, a continuous-rod fragmentation warhead, and an infrared seeker.

The seeker tracks a difference in temperatures detected and uses proportional guidance to achieve impact. Older variants such as the AIM-9B with uncooled seeker heads could track only the high temperatures of engine exhaust, making them strictly rear-aspect. Later variants, however, featured liquid nitrogen coolant bottles in the launchers, allowing the missile to track any part of the aircraft heated by air resistance due to high-speed flight, giving modern Sidewinders all-aspect capabilities.

The nose canards provide maneuverability for the AIM-9, with the AIM-9X using thrust vectoring to augment this. The hot gases generated were used to actuate the nose canards in older models, while newer variants use thermal batteries.

To minimize the amount of energy devoted to actuating control surfaces, the AIM-9 does not use active roll stabilization. Instead, it uses rollerons, small finned metal discs protruding out of the aft end of the tips of the tail fins which are spun by the passing airflow as the missile flies through the air, providing gyroscopic stabilization.

The AIM-9 uses a passive infrared proximity fuze to detonate its warhead near an enemy aircraft, scattering fragments that aim to damage the aircraft, rendering it inoperable. The continuous rod warhead features rods welded together to form a cylindrical outer shell, with explosive filler inside. Upon detonation, the rods expand in a toroidal shape, ensuring that at least some portion of the shrapnel hits enemy aircraft.

Newer models of the AIM-9 sought to increase the range that the seeker head's gimbal can turn, allowing the missile to track aircraft at greater angles from its direct line of sight, or boresight. Models such as the AIM-9L, AIM-9M, and AIM-9X feature high off-boresight capabilities, meaning they are able to track targets at high seeker gimbal angles, or highly distant from the boresight.

== Guidance ==
A missile (red) intercepts a target (blue) by maintaining constant bearing to it (grey)

The Sidewinder is guided not by the actual position recorded by the detector, but by the change in position since the last sighting. So if the target remains at 5 degrees left between two rotations of the mirror, the electronics would not output any signal to the control system. Consider a missile fired at right angles to its target; if the missile is flying at the same speed as the target, it should "lead" it by 45 degrees, flying to an impact point far in front of where the target was when it was fired. If the missile is traveling four times the speed of the target, it should follow an angle about 11 degrees in front. In either case, the missile should keep that angle all the way to interception, which means that the angle that the target makes against the detector is constant. It was this constant angle that the Sidewinder attempted to maintain. This "proportional pursuit" system is straightforward to implement and offers high-performance lead calculation almost for free and can respond to changes in the target's flight path, which is much more efficient and makes the missile "lead" the target.

== History ==
=== Origins ===
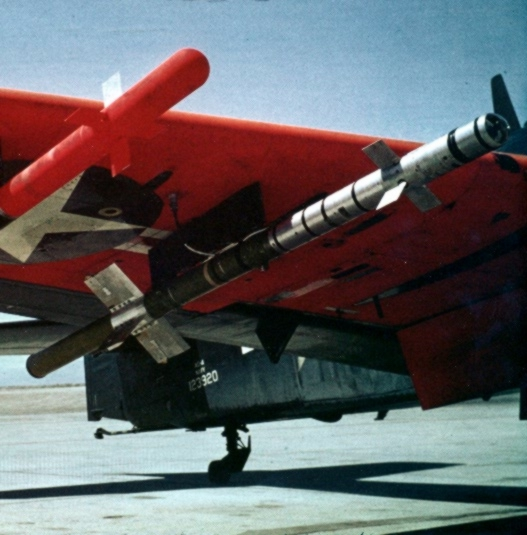
Prototype Sidewinder-1 missile on an AD-4 Skyraider during flight testing at NAWS China Lake, 1952

During World War II, various researchers in Germany designed infrared guidance systems of various complexity. The most mature development of these, codenamed Hamburg, was intended for use by the Blohm & Voss BV 143 glide bomb in an anti-ship role. Hamburg used a single IR photocell as its detector along with a spinning disk with lines painted on it, alternately known as a "reticle" or "chopper". The reticle spun at a fixed speed, causing the output of the photocell to be interrupted in a pattern, and the precise timing of the resulting signal indicated the bearing of the target. Although Hamburg and similar devices like Madrid were essentially complete, the work of mating them to a missile had not been carried out by the time the war ended.

In the immediate post-war era, Allied military intelligence teams collected this information, along with many of the engineers working on these projects. Several lengthy reports on the various systems were produced and disseminated among the Western aircraft firms, while a number of the engineers joined these companies to work on various missile projects. By the late 1940s a wide variety of missile projects were underway, from huge systems like the Bell Bomi rocket-powered bomber to small systems like air-to-air missiles. By the early 1950s, both the US Air Force and Royal Air Force had started major IR seeker missile projects.

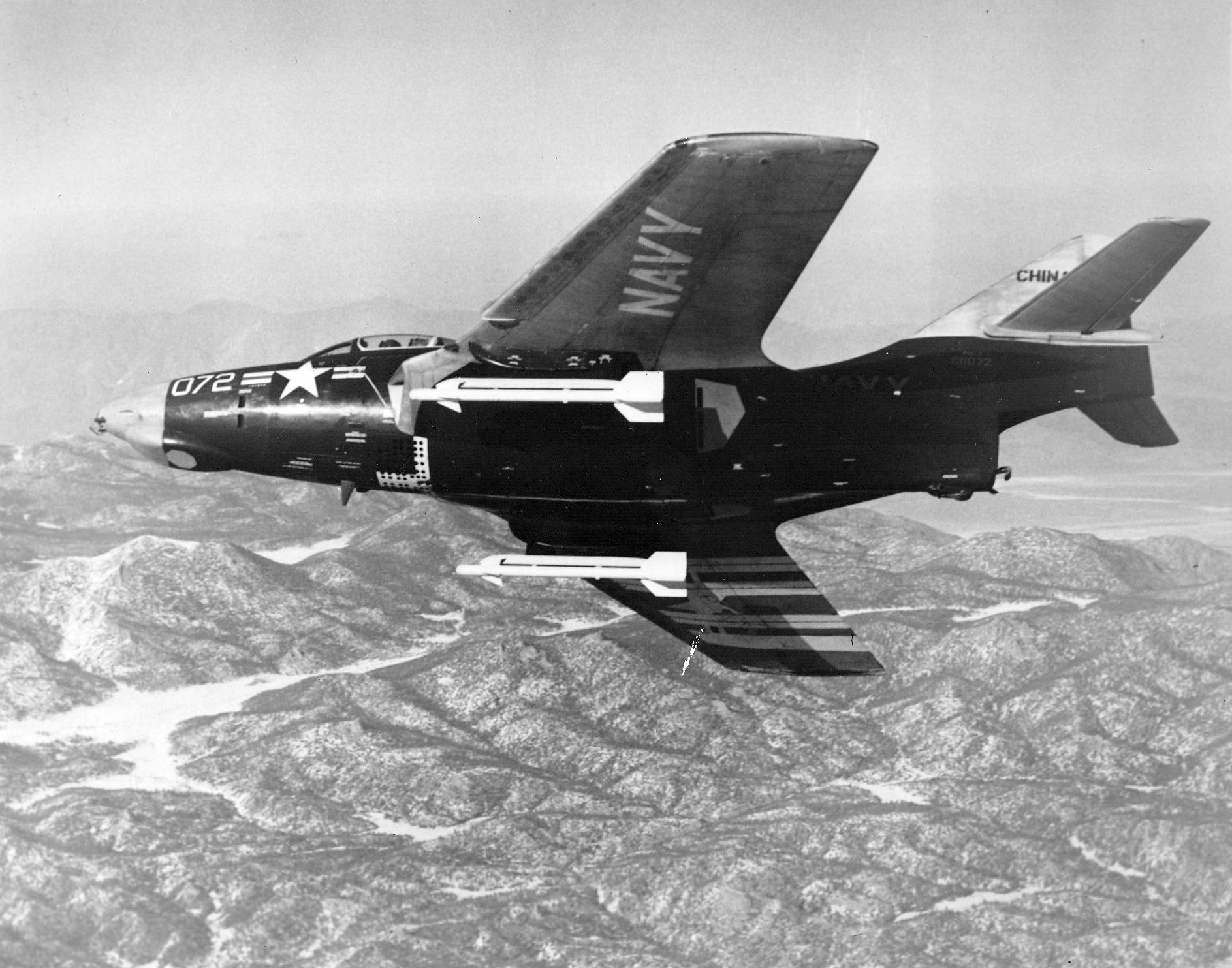
An F9F-8 Cougar with AIM-9Bs Naval Ordnance Test Station China Lake in 1956

The development of the Sidewinder missile began in 1946 at the Naval Ordnance Test Station (NOTS), Inyokern, California, now the Naval Air Weapons Station China Lake, as an in-house research project conceived by William B. McLean. McLean initially called his effort "Local Fuze Project 602" using laboratory funding, volunteer help and fuze funding to develop what they called a heat-homing rocket. The name Sidewinder was selected in 1950 and is the common name of Crotalus cerastes, a rattlesnake, which uses infrared sensory organs to hunt warm-blooded prey.

It did not receive official funding until 1951 when the effort was mature enough to show to Admiral William "Deak" Parsons, the Deputy Chief of the Bureau of Ordnance (BuOrd). It subsequently received designation as a program in 1952. Originally called the Sidewinder 1, the first live firing was on 3 September 1952. The missile intercepted a drone for the first time on 11 September 1953. The missile carried out 51 guided flights in 1954, and in 1955 production was authorized.

In 1954, the US Air Force carried out trials with the original AIM-9A and the improved AIM-9B at the Holloman Air Development Center. The first operational use of the missile was by Grumman F9F-8 Cougars and FJ-3 Furies of the United States Navy in the middle of 1956.

=== First generation rear-aspect variants ===
Nearly 100,000 of the first generation (AIM-9B/C/D/E) of the Sidewinder were produced with Raytheon and General Electric as major subcontractors. Philco-Ford produced the guidance and control sections of the early missiles. The NATO version of the first-generation missile was built under license in Germany by Bodenseewerk Gerätetechnik; 9,200 examples were built.

=== AIM-9A (AAM-N-7 Sidewinder I) (USN) ===
AIM-9A was a pre-production of the Sidewinder, first fired successfully in September 1953. Missile production began in 1955, and the first models entered the Navy's fleet service in 1956. Generally, it was a prototype production run, with 240 pieces being produced, and mainly intended for training pilots in air combat techniques. The AIM-9A was initially called the AAM-N-7 before the tri-service designation change in 1962.

The AIM-9A and AIM-9B were originally fitted with a non-propulsive attachment (NPA) for their MK 15 and MK 17 rocket motors. If the motor accidentally ignited while kept in storage, during transport, or while it was fitted to the aircraft hardpoints, the NPA would direct the exhaust gases at right angles rather than straight back. In these cases, the missile would not move. While the NPA safety device itself suffered no failures, some ordnance men forgot to remove them after hanging the missiles in the hardpoints. When the pilots attempted to fire the missiles in flight, the hot exhaust gases were redirected directly towards the wings, severely damaging the aircraft. After losing three aircraft in this manner, the US Navy withdrew the NPA from use.

=== AIM-9B (AAM-N-7 Sidewinder IA) (USAF/USN) ===
A F-104 Starfighter test-firing an AIM-9 Sidewinder against a QF-80 target drone at Eglin Air Force Base

The AIM-9B is very similar to the AIM-9A, but the "B" has a more sophisticated rear and more aerodynamical front fins. The AIM-9B is a very limited weapon, but it had no serious competitors and counters when it was introduced, causing it to be adopted by the USAF and NATO as a standard weapon, with around 80,000 units being produced from 1958 to 1962.

The viewing angle of the AIM-9B's sensor was a minuscule 4 degrees, so at launch, the pilot had to accurately aim the aircraft's sight over or above the target (to account for drag). The speed of the conical scan was very slow, additionally, the uncooled missile had a low sensitivity and was liable to extraneous heat. The AIM-9B was recommended for use on non-threatening targets (like bombers), only from behind (so it can lock on the thermal radiation from the target engines) and only with the sun behind or to the side of the launching aircraft (as the missile would lock onto it due to its thermal radiation).

It was famously the first Sidewinder variant to be fired in anger as on 24 September 1958, it achieved the world's first successful kill with an air-to-air missile, when Taiwanese F-86Fs shot down Communist Chinese MiG-15s using AIM-9Bs supplied and fitted by the U.S. Navy (USN).

==== AIM-9B derivatives ====
RB24: A license built AIM-9B Sidewinder from Sweden.

K-13/R-3 (AA-2):

The K-13/R-3 was reverse-engineered from the American AIM-9B Sidewinder. During the Taiwan Strait conflict in 1958, an AIM-9B Sidewinder missile fell near Wenzhou without exploding and was recovered by Chinese forces. The Soviets later learned that the Chinese had obtained the missile, and after negotiations, they persuaded the Chinese to send one to the Soviet Union, which enabled them to develop the K-13.

K-13/R-3 (AA-2) variants:

K-13/R-3 (Object 300) (AA-2 Atoll): It was the standard variant and entered limited service only two years later in 1960.

K-13A/R-3S (Object 310) (AA-2A Atoll): This entered service in 1962. The R-3S was the first version to enter widespread production, in spite of a very long seeker settling time around 22 seconds, as opposed to 11 seconds for the original version.

PL-2: Chinese-produced R-3S.

A-91: Romanian-produced R-3S.

K-13R/R-3R (Object 320) (AA-2B/C Atoll): While the R-3S was being introduced in 1961, work started on a semi-active radar homing (SARH) version for high-altitude use, with 8 km range, similar to the little-used US Navy AIM-9C Sidewinder. This took longer to develop, and did not enter service until 1966.

K-13M/R-13M (Object 380) (AA-2D Atoll): The R-13M is a much improved version of the R-3S and has capabilities similar to the AIM-9G Sidewinder. The R-13M is still a tail engagement missile only but is far more capable than the R-3S due to its new seeker and rocket motor. The new cooled seeker is more accurate and somewhat more resistant to countermeasures. The new rocket motor burns longer and the redesigned body makes the R-13M more maneuverable.

K-13M1/R-13M1: Improved R-13M with new forward fins introduced in 1976.

=== AIM-9C (AAM-N-7 Sidewinder IC (SARH)) (USN) ===
The lackluster performance of the AIM-9B caused the Navy to look for a successor. In 1963 the AAM-N-7 Sidewinder IC was developed in two variations: a SARH (semi-active radar homing) variant (AIM-9C) and an IR (AIM-9D) in 1963. The AIM-9C's semi-active radar was exclusively tied to the F-8 Crusader's radar and fire control system (FCS). A total of around 1,000 AIM-9C missiles were launched from 1965 to 1967, but their usage in the Vietnam war proved unsuccessful, downing no enemies. A filter modification program for reworked units (to allow high altitude capability up to 18,288m (60,000 feet)) was the only planned modification. In 1984, long after the variant's retirement, Motorola was contracted to re-manufacture remaining stocks of AIM-9C missiles into the AGM-122A Sidearm, a low cost air-to-surface anti-radiation missile.

=== AIM-9D "Delta" (AAM-N-7 Sidewinder IC (IR)) (USN) ===
Recognizing the limitations of the initial AIM-9B, the US Navy (USN) worked to improve the missile's performance. They changed the missile nose to an aerodynamical ogival nose. The seeker was improved with a wider field of view beyond 25 degrees and a reduced instantaneous field of view of 2.5 degrees to reduce foreign thermal interference (primarily from flares). A nitrogen cooling system was added for the fuze, enhancing the missile's heat sensitivity. Maneuverability was also improved with a faster tracking rate and a new actuator system. The Sidewinder's range was improved as well, with the new Hercules MK 36 solid-fuel rocket motor allowing the missile to fly up to 18 km. Finally, a new Mk 48 continuous-rod warhead was fitted to the missile for increased damage; this also meant infrared or a radio proximity fuze could be used. These improvements were all added to the AIM-9D and went into service with the USN. Around 1,000 AIM-9D units were produced from 1965 to 1969. A significant issue with the AIM-9D was breakup during launch. The AIM-9D was eventually developed into the AIM-9G.

==== AIM-9D derivatives ====
ATM-9D (USN): AIM-9D used for captive flight target acquisition training.

GDU-1/B: AIM-9D used for firing practice.

=== AIM-9E "Echo" (USAF) ===
The AIM-9E "Echo" was the first version developed solely by the U.S. Air Force (USAF). The AIM-9E allows the expansion of the weapons acquisition envelope, especially at low-altitude, increasing its Probability of Kill (P[k]). It achieved this using a new low-drag conical nose head, being a distinguishing feature of USAF Sidewinders. A magnesium fluoride seeker dome was introduced, along with a more compact optical assembly, an improved guidance control system, new electronics, and significant changes to the internal wiring harnesses. These improvements facilitated a better 100 Hz reticle rate, and a 16.5 deg/sec tracking rate. The most significant design change was the addition of cooling for the PbS detector, adding Peltier (thermoelectric) cooling, giving the advantage of unlimited cooling when positioned on the launch rail, but is only active when electrical power is present. The AIM-9E gives greater range over the AIM-9B, but is worse than the "D". Over 5,000 AIM-9B's were rebuilt into AIM-9E's.

The AIM-9E appeared in Vietnam after the conclusion of the Operation Rolling Thunder in 1968, with the U.S. Air Force (USAF), becoming one of their main missile armaments. Up until Operation Linebacker in 1972 intense air-to-air activity in Vietnam was not present. There were 71 AIM-9E launch attempts from January to October 1972, however, only 6 missiles managed to down an aircraft, with 1 other hitting an aircraft, but not causing complete destruction. Reasons for the poor success rate was listed as "poor air crew training, launches out of the envelope, the tactical situation, marginal tone, tone discrimination, the missile going ballistic, and other malfunctions".

==== AIM-9E variants ====
AIM-9E: Standard production model.

AIM-9E-2: Some "E" models are equipped with reduced-smoke rocket motors and have the designation AIM-9E-2

=== AIM-9B FGW.2 Sidewinder (AIM-9F) ===
As the Sidewinder was being acquired by NATO forces, licensed production was given to West Germany and they would produce around 15,000 units. Like the Americans, the West Germans sought to improve the AIM-9B design due to its limitations. The only visible exterior difference is a greenish sensor window, but many tech improvements were added beneath the shell. Unnoticed improvements include solid state electronics (instead of vacuum tubes), carbon dioxide seeker cooling, a new nose dome and superior optical filtering. Conversions were done to European AIM-9Bs to upgrade them to the FGW.2 standard. The official designation is the AIM-9B FGW.2 but it is known as the AIM-9F in US nomenclature.

=== AIM-9G "Golf" (USN) ===
The AIM-9G was very similar to the AIM-9D in most aspects, and did not differ externally. The AIM-9G was an AIM-9D that used an improved AIM-9D seeker head with SEAM (Sidewinder Extended Acquisition Mode). This allowed the slewing of the optics through a search pattern to acquire the enemy (most likely using a rosette scan), also allowing the slaving of the missile optics to a radar or helmet sight. This was connected to the onboard computer of the aircraft, which gave the capability of capturing the target using the data coming from the airborne radar. This meant that the target could be locked without being in the sights, and the missile automatically got pre-launch instructions. The conical scanning speed was also increased greatly. The seeker head was now able to seek in a 25˚ circular scan. This allowed the AIM-9G to have an improved chance of acquiring the target than earlier models. This, along with other upgraded solid-state modules, culminated in the AIM-9G. The improvement was substantial enough that an order of 5,000 AIM-9D seekers was stopped at 1,850 units, with the rest being ordered to AIM-9G seeker specifications instead. Around 2120 AIM-9G were built by Raytheon from 1970 to 1972.

The AIM-9G would be used with its predecessor, the AIM-9D, during the Vietnam War, as the US Navy's choice of IR missile. A 46% hit rate with the AIM-9G during Operation Linebackers I and II in 1972 was achieved, of which 14 aircraft were MiG-17s and the other 7 were MiG-21s. This was due to the missile design and USN fighter pilot training at TOPGUN. The United States Air Force attempted to attain AIM-9Gs from the USN, due to bad experience with their AIM-9 Sidewinders models (B, E, and J), but they were incompatible with US Air Force's Sidewinder launchers due to the different cooling mechanisms. (the USN used a nitrogen gas container on the launcher, which the USAF did not use)

==== AIM-9G derivatives ====
ATM-9G (USN): AIM-9G used for captive flight target acquisition training.

=== AIM-9H (USN) ===
Within December 1965, two designers McLean and LaBerge (who were employed by Philco-Ford) came together to create ways to improve the AIM-9G's reliability. One submission was to advance all the remaining missile electronic components from vacuum to solid-state gradually. The US Air Force adhered to this steady replacement of their AIM-9s to solid-state, however the Navy opted for a different approach after Walt Freitag, a USN engineer proposed a full change to solid-state in one missile.

The "H" variant had major changes over the AIM-9D/G, which had multiple issues with reliability. One of the issues was the intolerance of the vacuum tubes to repeated 20 ft/sec sink rate landings by US Navy aircraft on carrier decks. The "H" was the first Sidewinder to be fully solid state, replacing the original vacuum tubes. The AIM-9H also included a new lead sulphide detector, using nitrogen cooling. The new guidance package was built using semiconductors. When the engineers redesigned these electronics, they essentially kept the AIM-9G's optical system, but the tracking rate increased further, from the original 12˚ to 20˚ degrees per second, this complementing the more powerful 120 lb.ft actuators that had been installed. They also replaced the thermal battery with a turbo-alternator. The AIM-9H also included a continuous-rod bundle warhead, improving its destructive capability. The AIM-9H was the last and most maneuverable of the rear-aspect USN Sidewinders, with USN moving to the all-aspect AIM-9L.

The AIM-9H was actually used at the very end of the Vietnam war, with it being introduced into the US navy service in 1972 and being used in Operation Linebacker. A total of around 7,700 AIM-9H units would be manufactured from 1972 to 1974 by Philco-Ford and Raytheon. The AIM-9H was the basis for the all-aspect USAF/USN AIM-9L.

==== AIM-9H derivatives ====
ATM-9H: Was a training version of the AIM-9H for captive flight target acquisition.

=== AIM-9K (USN) ===
The AIM-9K was a planned U.S. Navy (USN) upgrade to the AIM-9H, but the development was abandoned in favor of USAF/USN joint AIM-9L.

=== AIM-9J (USAF) ===
As the AIM-9E Sidewinder was entering service in Southeast Asia during the conclusion of Operation Rolling Thunder, the USAF started the development the next generation Sidewinders to replace the AIM-9E. In November 1968, the testing of an AIM-9E upgrade the "Extended Performance" began. The missile was designed to give pilots a more capable close-range IR missile against a maneuvering target. It would eventually be designated the AIM-9J.

Preliminary testing of the AIM-9J ended on 3 July 1972, indicating that further in-depth testing and evaluation were necessary prior to replacing the AIM-9B/E. On 8 June 1972, the AIM-9J was authorized for introduction into Southeast Asia under Phase IIA of its evaluation program, and approval to employ it in combat was received on 31 July 1972. The first combat flight of the AIM-9J occurred on 2 August 1972, but it wasn't until 9 September 1972 that the first three AIM-9Js were fired in combat. Only 31 combat firings were attempted before the cease fire in January, 1973. Considering the original intent of its development, the AIM-9J performance was relatively unimpressive in combat. Nevertheless, compared to its competitors (the AIM-7E-2 and the AIM-9E), the AIM-9J did appear relatively successful. The AIM-9J kill rate per missile fired was 13 percent from September to December 1972, compared to 5 percent and 8 percent registered by the AIM-7E-2 and AIM-9E, respectively. When viewed on the basis of effectiveness per engagement, the AIM-9J fared better with 33 percent kills per engagement, versus 11 percent and 15 percent for the AIM-7E-2 and AIM-9E, respectively.

The AIM-9J was an upgrade to the AIM-9E. It included:

- The partial replacement of old-fashioned tube electronics with solid-state electronics.
- A longer-burning gas generator, which increased flight time to 40 seconds.
- More powerful actuators, driving new square-tipped double-delta canards. This doubled the single-plane "g" capability.

Around 6,700 AIM-9Js were built from 1972 onward. These were mostly converted existing AIM-9B/E missiles.

==== AIM-9J variants ====
AIM-9J: The base variant.

AIM-9J-1 (AIM-9N): AIM-9J-1 (later redesignated the AIM-9N) was an upgrade to the AIM-9J. The AIM-9N had a similar missile configuration to the AIM-9J, but the three main circuit boards were substantially redesigned to help improve seeker performance. Around 7,000 of the AIM-9N were built/rebuilt.

AIM-9J-3: AIM-9J-1 with the new SR116 motor.

=== AIM-9P ===
The AIM-9P Sidewinder missile was a USAF sponsored family of export missiles based on the AIM-9J/N, and would be upgraded multiple times over its lifespan. The AIM-9P was an improved AIM-9J with a new motor, fuze and better reliability. It included a greater engagement range, allowing it to be launched farther from the target. The AIM-9P was more maneuverable than the AIM-9J, and also included improved solid-state electronics that increased reliability and maintainability. The AIM-9P was either a rebuilt B/E or J or all-new production. Deliveries of the AIM-9P began in 1978.

==== AIM-9P Variants ====
AIM-9P: The base model.

AIM-9P-1: Introduced the DSU-15/B AOTD laser proximity fuze, replacing the previous infrared influence fuze with an active optical target detector.

AIM-9P-2: Includes a reduced-smoke rocket motor.

AIM-9P-3: Includes a reduced-smoke motor, an active optical target detector, an improved guidance and control section, mechanical strengthening to the warhead, guidance system and control section, and a new insensitive munitions warhead. The warhead uses a new explosive material, this explosive material is less sensitive to high temperature and has a longer shelf life.

AIM-9P-4: Introduced the ALASCA features and technology found on the AIM-9L/M variants.

AIM-9P-5: Added improved IRCCM from the AIM-9M.

==== AIM-9P derivatives ====
RB24J: Swedish designation for the AIM-9P-3

Pre all-aspect variants
Subtype	AIM-9B	AIM-9D	AIM-9E	AIM-9G	AIM-9H	AIM-9J
Service	Joint	USN	USAF	USN	USN	USAF
Seeker design features
Origin	Naval Weapons Center	AIM-9B	AIM-9B	AIM-9D	AIM-9G	AIM-9E
Detector	PbS	PbS	PbS	PbS	PbS	PbS
Cooling	Uncooled	Nitrogen	Peltier	Nitrogen	Nitrogen	Peltier
Dome window	Glass	MgF_{2}	MgF_{2}	MgF_{2}	MgF_{2}	MgF_{2}
Reticle speed (Hz)	70	125	100	125	125	100
Modulation	AM	AM	AM	AM	AM	AM
Track rate (°/s)	8.0 - 11.0	12.0	12.0	12.0	20.0	16.5
Electronics	thermionic	thermionic	hybrid	thermionic	solid state	hybrid
Warhead	4.5 kg (9.9 lb) blast-fragmentation	11 kg (24 lb) Mk. 48 continuous rod	4.5 kg (9.9 lb) blast-fragmentation	11 kg (24 lb) Mk. 48 continuous rod	11 kg (24 lb) Mk. 48 continuous rod	4.5 kg (9.9 lb) blast-fragmentation
Fuze	Passive-IR	Passive-IR/HF	Passive-IR	Passive-IR/HF	Passive-IR/HF	Passive-IR
Powerplant
Manufacturer	Thiokol	Hercules	Thiokol	Hercules	Hercules/Bermite	Hercules/Aerojet
Type	Mk.17	Mk.36	Mk.17	Mk.36	Mk.36 Mod 5, 6, 7	Mk.17
Launcher	Aero-III	LAU-7A	Aero-III	LAU-7A	LAU-7A	Aero-III
Missile dimensions
Length	2.82 m (9.3 ft)	2.86 m (9.4 ft)	2.99 m (9.8 ft)	2.86 m (9.4 ft)	2.86 m (9.4 ft)	3.1 m (10 ft)
Span	0.55 m (1.8 ft)	0.62 m (2.0 ft)	0.56 m (1.8 ft)	0.62 m (2.0 ft)	0.62 m (2.0 ft)	0.56 m (1.8 ft)
Weight	70.39 kg (155.2 lb)	88.5 kg (195 lb)	76.43 kg (168.5 lb)	87 kg (192 lb)	84.5 kg (186 lb)	76.93 kg (169.6 lb)

Note: the speed of the B model was around 1.7 Mach and the other models above 2.5.

=== AIM-9L (USAF/USN) ===
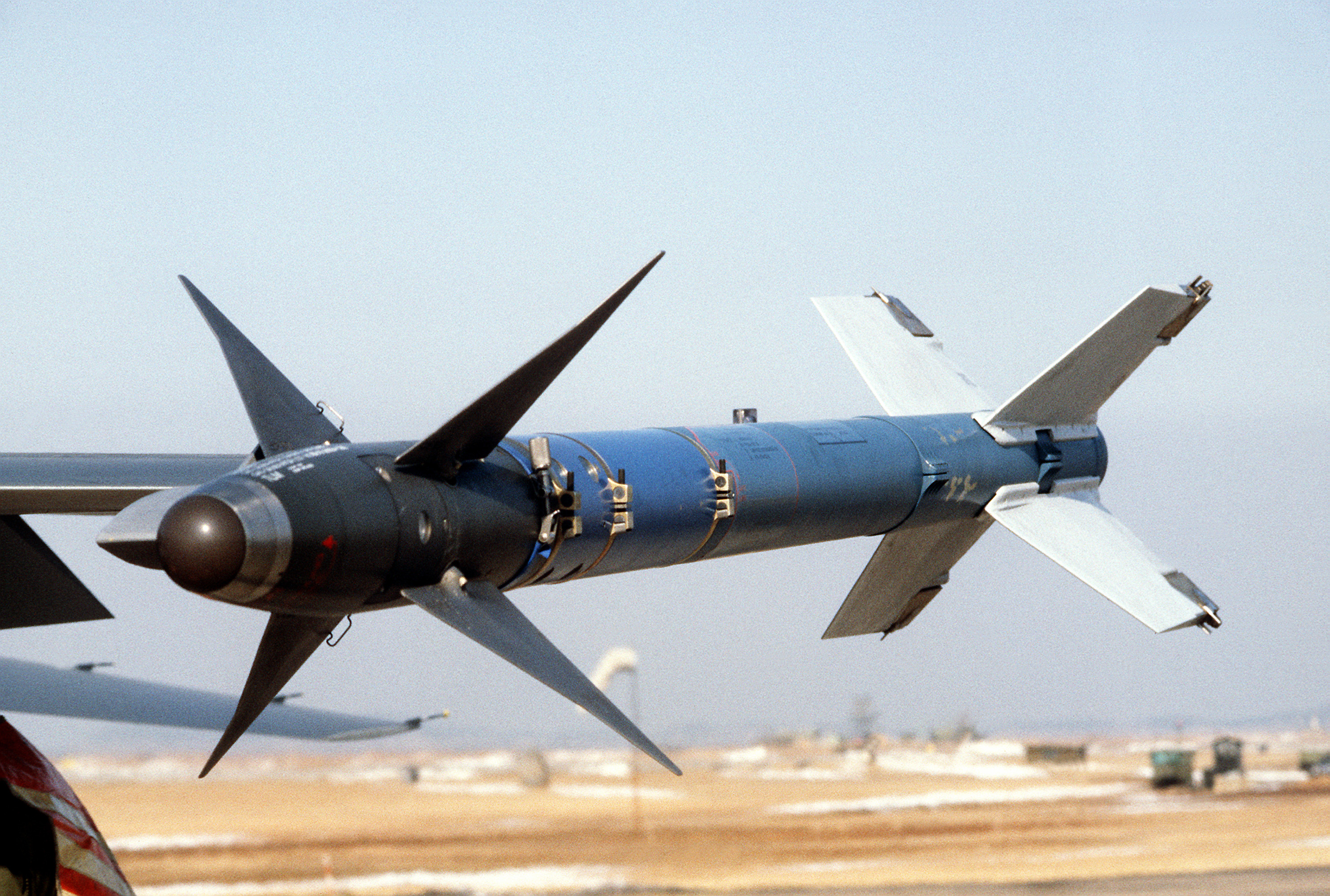
AIM-9L Captive air training missile with part/section in blue color, denoting inert warhead and rocket motor, for training purposes.

The next major advance in IR Sidewinder development was the AIM-9L ("Lima") model which was in full production in 1977. This was the first "all-aspect" Sidewinder with the ability to attack from all directions, including head-on, which had a dramatic effect on close-in combat tactics.

AIM-9L seeker and fuze sections detail in SVG format.

Its first combat use was by a pair of US Navy F-14s in the Gulf of Sidra in 1981 versus two Libyan Sukhoi Su-22s, both of the latter being destroyed by AIM-9Ls. Its first use in a large-scale conflict was by the United Kingdom during the 1982 Falklands War. In this campaign the "Lima" reportedly achieved kills from 80% of launches, scoring 17 kills and 2 shared kills against Argentine aircraft.

==== AIM-9L Derivatives ====
DATM-9L (USAF/USN): This is an AIM-9L used to train ground personnel in missile assembly, disassembly, loading, transportation, and storage procedures and techniques.

GDU-6/C: Was a training version of the AIM-9L, may have been an earlier designation of the DATM-9L.

RB74 (RB24L): The RB74 was the Swedish designation of the AIM-9L. The RB24L was the original designation, but was changed to the RB74.

AIM-9L/I: German modification produced by Diehl with a smokeless motor.

AIM-9L/I-1: German modification produced by Diehl with a smokeless motor and better seeker.

=== AIM-9M (USAF/USN) ===
The AIM-9M is an improved AIM-9L inheriting the all-aspect capability of the L model, but providing all-around higher performance. Having a better background rejection and infrared countermeasures discrimination (WGU-4/B), a low-smoke motor to reduce the visual signature of the weapon, and improved guidance control section with counter-countermeasures and improved maintainability and producibility. The AIM-9M uses an annular blast fragmentation warhead. These modifications increase ability to locate and lock-on a target and decrease the missile's chances for detection.

It was deployed in large numbers during the 1991 Gulf War, the AIM-9M was responsible for all 10 Sidewinder kills recorded during that conflict. The AIM-9M was used by the RAAF's being their standard dogfight AAM, carried by the F/A-18 and F-111.

==== AIM-9M Variants ====
- AIM-9M (USAF/USN): The standard model AIM-9M Model.
- AIM-9M-1 (USN): The AIM-9M-1 has very little information other than it uses the same Guidance Control System (GCS) as the AIM-9M-3.
- AIM-9M-2: No information other than the confirmation of its existence.
- AIM-9M-3 (USN): The only information regarding the AIM-9M-3 is that it uses the same GCS as the AIM-9M-1.
- AIM-9M-4 (USN): AIM-9M variant used by United States Navy, using a different GCS, other information on them is currently unknown.
- AIM-9M-5: No information other than the confirmation of its existence.
- AIM-9M-6 (USN): AIM-9M variant used by United States Navy using a different GCS, other information on them is currently unknown.
- AIM-9M-7: Variant modified for Operation Desert Storm/Shield to combat expected threats better. The nature of the upgrade is unknown.
- AIM-9M-8 (USN): Principal USN Production variant, this upgrade entailed replacing the motor with the new MK 36 MOD 11, a new guidance section (WGU-4E/B), and AOTD (DSU-15B/B).(This was achieved through the replacement of five circuit cards and the associated parent board)
- AIM-9M-9 (USAF): Principal USAF Production variant, this upgrade entailed replacing the motor with the new MK 36 MOD 11, a new guidance section (WGU-4E/B), and AOTD (DSU-15B/B)
- AIM-9M-10 (USN): Modified AIM-9M-8 variant for use on the F/A-18E/F Super Hornet, these are retrofitted AIM-9-8's. The AIM-9M-10 differs by replacement to the wings and forward hanger.
- AIM-9M modified for surface-to-air operation, developed by Ukraine from January 2025, claimed to have shot down Russian aircraft in May 2025.

==== AIM-9M Derivatives ====
- AIM-9Q (USN): The AIM-9Q is an AIM-9M modified with upgraded guidance-control section, further information on the missile is unknown and it was either canceled or became an AIM-9M sub-variant.
- CATM-9M (USAF/USN): A training AIM-9M Used for pilot training in aerial target acquisition and use of aircraft controls/displays.
- CATM-9M-1: This was used for AIM-9M-1/3 training.
- CATM-9M-2: This was used for AIM-9M-1/3 training.
- CATM-9M-4: This was used for AIM-9M-1/3 training.
- CATM-9M-6: This was used for AIM-9M-1/3 training.
- CATM-9M-8: This was used for AIM-9M-1/3 training.
- CATM-9M-12: This was used for AIM-9M-8/9 training.
- CATM-9M-14: This was used for AIM-9M-8/9 training.
- CATM-9M-27: This variant was used for AIM-9M-10 training.
- NATM-9M (USAF/USN): It is a permanent test missile version of the AIM-9M. The modification into a test missile includes the replacing live-test warhead and/or telemetry section.

==== NATM-9M Variants ====
- NATM-9M-1: No information other than the confirmation of its existence as a test missile.
- NATM-9M-2: No information other than the confirmation of its existence as a test missile.
- NATM-9M-3: No information other than the confirmation of its existence as a test missile.
- NATM-9M-4: No information other than the confirmation of its existence as a test missile.

=== AIM-9R (USN) ===
The AIM-9R was an improved AIM-9M developed by the navy, it included the new WGU-19/B IIR (Imaging Infrared) seeker, with much better tracking performance and detection performance (during daytime), with the ability to reject both background terrain and clouds, a bigger seeker FOV, and more effective counter-countermeasures capability against known and postulated jamming or seduction techniques. The first live firing occurred in 1990, but in 1992, production was canceled as a lack of funding due to defense budget cuts.

=== AIM-9S (USN) ===
The AIM-9S is a modified AIM-9M with the counter-countermeasures (CCM) equipment removed from the guidance-control section. This derivative is used for FMS (Foreign Military Sales), giving the latest Sidewinder technology to US allies without giving away valuable missile technology. A customer of the AIM-9S was Turkey with them having 310 units in 2005.

=== BOA/Box Office ===
China Lake developed an improved compressed carriage control configuration titled BOA. "Compressed carriage" missiles have smaller control surfaces to allow more missiles to fit in a given space. The surfaces may be permanently "clipped", or may fold out when the missile is launched.

=== AIM-9X (USAF/USN) ===
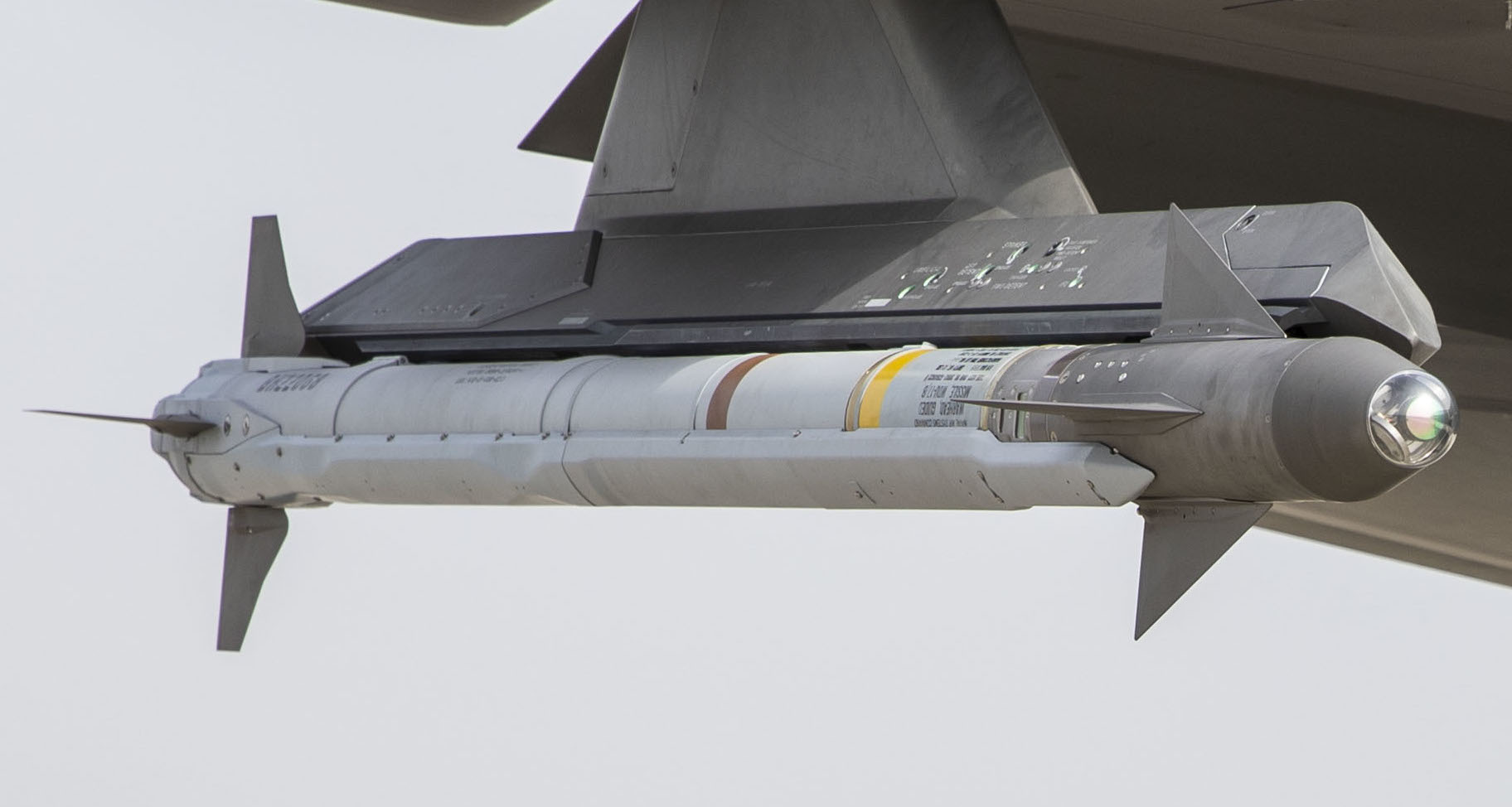
AIM-9X mounted on a wingtip pylon of an F-35B

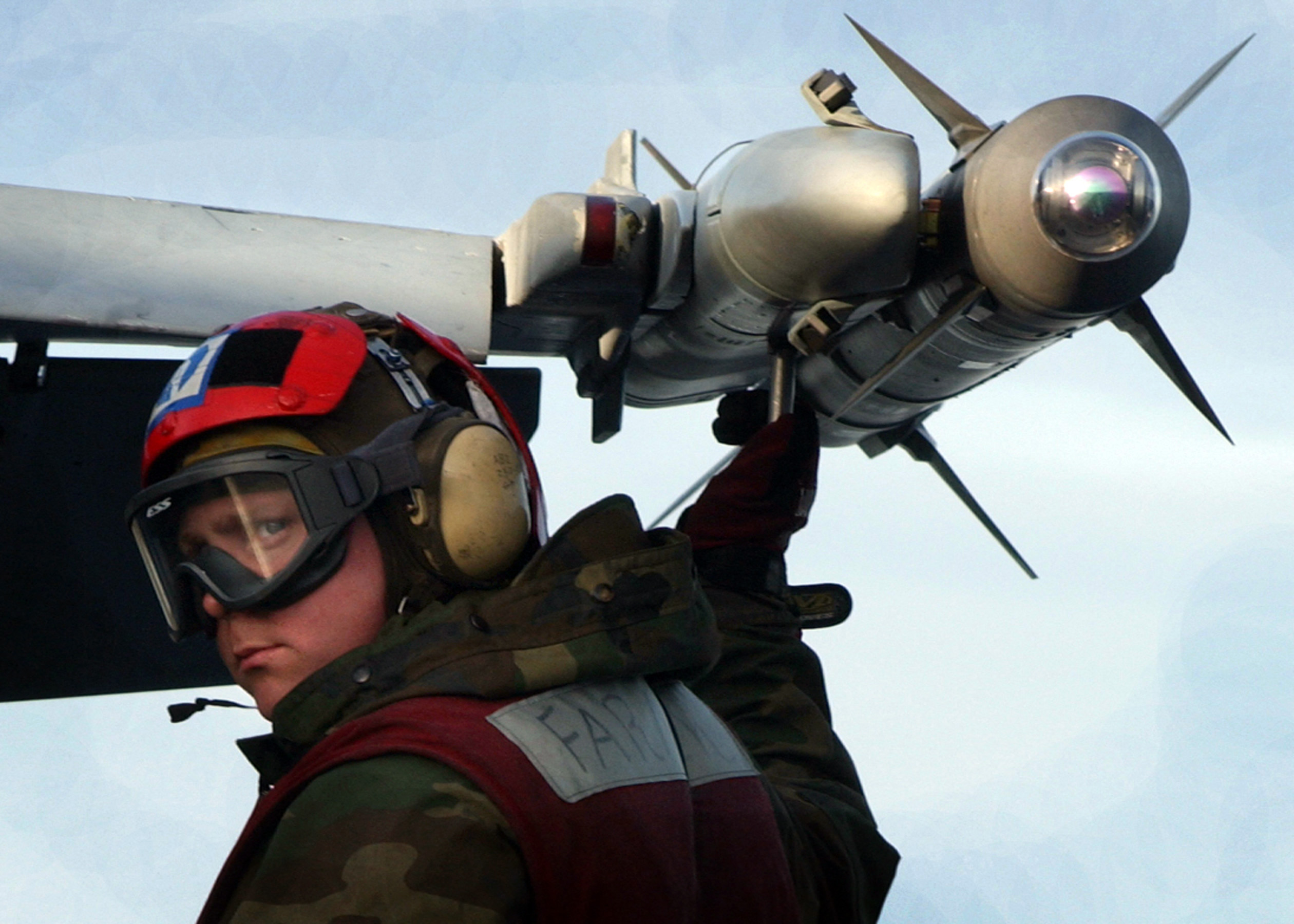
A sailor removing the arming pin from an AIM-9X mounted on the wingtip of a US Navy F/A-18C Hornet in 2004

Hughes Electronics was awarded a contract for development of the AIM-9X Sidewinder in 1996 after a competition against Raytheon for the next short-range aerial combat missile, though Raytheon purchased the defense portions of Hughes Electronics the following year. The AIM-9X entered service in November 2003 with the USAF (the lead platform was the F-15C) and the USN (the lead platform was the F/A-18C) and is a substantial upgrade to the Sidewinder family featuring an imaging infrared 128×128 element focal-plane array (FPA) seeker with claimed 90° off-boresight capability, compatibility with helmet-mounted displays such as the new U.S. Joint Helmet Mounted Cueing System (JHMCS), and a totally new two-axis thrust-vectoring control (TVC) system providing increased turn capability over traditional control surfaces (60 g). Using the JHMCS, a pilot can point the AIM-9X missile's seeker and "lock on" by simply looking at a target, thereby increasing air combat effectiveness. It retains the same rocket motor, fuze and warhead of the AIM-9M, but its lower drag gives it improved range and speed. The AIM-9X also includes an internal cooling system, eliminating the need to use launch-rail nitrogen bottles (U.S. Navy and Marines) or internal argon bottles (USAF). It also features an electronic safe and arm device similar to the AMRAAM, allowing for a reduction in minimum range, and reprogrammable infrared Counter Counter Measures (IRCCM) capability that coupled with the FPA provides improved look down into clutter and performance against the latest IRCM. Though not part of the original requirement, the AIM-9X demonstrated potential for lock-on after launch capability, allowing for possible internal use for the F-35 Lightning II, F-22 Raptor and even in a submarine-launched configuration for use against ASW platforms. The AIM-9X has been tested for a surface attack capability, with mixed results.

==== Block II ====
Testing work on the AIM-9X Block II version began in September 2008. The Block II adds lock-on after launch capability with a datalink, so the missile can be launched first and then directed to its target afterwards by an aircraft with the proper equipment for 360-degree engagements, such as the F-35 or the F-22. By January 2013, the AIM-9X Block II was about halfway through its operational testing and performing better than expected. NAVAIR reported that the missile was exceeding performance requirements in all areas, including lock-on after launch (LOAL). One area where the Block II needs improvement is helmetless high off-boresight (HHOBS) performance. It is functioning well on the missile, but performance is below that of the Block I AIM-9X. The HHOBS deficiency does not impact any other Block II capabilities, and is planned to be improved upon by a software cleanup build. Objectives of the operational test were due to be completed by the third quarter of 2013. However, as of May 2014 there have been plans to resume operational testing and evaluation (including surface-to-air missile system compatibility). As of June 2013, Raytheon had delivered 5,000 AIM-9X missiles to the armed services. On 18 June 2017, after an AIM-9X did not successfully track a targeted Syrian Air Force Su-22 Fitter, US Navy Lt. Cmdr. Michael "Mob" Tremel flying a F/A-18E Super Hornet used an AMRAAM AAM to successfully destroy the enemy aircraft. There is a theory that the Sidewinder is tested against American and not Soviet/Russian flares. The Sidewinder is used to rejecting American but not Soviet/Russian flares. Similar issues arose from the testing of the AIM-9P model. The missile would ignore American flares but go for Soviet ones due to their "different burn time, intensity and separation."

In February 2015, the U.S. Army successfully launched an AIM-9X Block II from the new Multi-Mission Launcher (MML), a truck-mounted missile launch container that can hold 15 of the missiles. The MML is part of the Indirect Fire Protection Capability Increment 2-Intercept (IFPC Inc. 2-I) to protect ground forces against cruise missile and unmanned aerial vehicle threats. The AIM-9X Block II has been determined by the Army to be the best solution to cruise missile and UAV threats because of its passive imaging infrared seeker. The MML will complement the AN/TWQ-1 Avenger air defense system and is expected to begin fielding in 2019.

==== Block III ====
In September 2012, Raytheon was ordered to continue developing the Sidewinder into a Block III variant, even though the Block II had not yet entered service. The USN projected that the new missile would have a 60 percent longer range, modern components to replace old ones, and an insensitive munitions warhead, which is more stable and less likely to detonate by accident, making it safer for ground crews. The need for the AIM-9 to have an increased range was caused by digital radio frequency memory (DRFM) jammers that can blind the onboard radar of an AIM-120D AMRAAM, so the Sidewinder Block III's passive imaging infrared homing guidance system was seen as a useful alternative. Although it could supplement the AMRAAM for beyond visual range (BVR) engagements, it would still be capable of performing within visual range (WVR). Modifying the AIM-9X was seen as a cost-effective alternative to developing a new missile in a time of declining budgets. To achieve the range increase, the rocket motor would have a combination of increased performance and missile power management. The Block III would "leverage" the Block II's guidance unit and electronics, including the AMRAAM-derived datalink. The Block III was scheduled to achieve initial operational capability (IOC) in 2022, following the increased number of F-35 Lightning II Joint Strike Fighters to enter service. The Navy pressed for this upgrade in response to a projected threat which analysts have speculated will be due to the difficulty of targeting upcoming Chinese fifth-generation jet fighters (Chengdu J-20, Shenyang J-31) with the radar-guided AMRAAM, specifically that Chinese advances in electronics will mean Chinese fighters will use their AESA radars as jammers to degrade the AIM-120's kill probability. However, the Navy's FY 2016 budget canceled the AIM-9X Block III as they cut down buys of the F-35C, as it was primarily intended to permit the fighter to carry six BVR missiles; the insensitive munition warhead will be retained for the AIM-9X program.

All-aspect variants
Subtype	AIM-9L	AIM-9M	AIM-9P-4/5	AIM-9R
Service	Joint	Joint	USAF, export	USN
Seeker design features
Origin	AIM-9H	AIM-9L	AIM-9J/N	AIM-9M
Detector	InSb	InSb	InSb	Focal-plane array
Cooling	Argon	Argon	Argon	–
Dome window	MgF_{2}	MgF_{2}	MgF_{2}	Glass
Reticle speed (Hz)	125	125	100	Focal-plane array
Modulation	FM	FM	FM	Focal-plane array
Track rate (°/s)	22	Classified	>16.5	Classified
Electronics	Solid state	Solid state	Solid state	Solid state
Warhead	9.4 kg (21 lb) WDU-17/B annular blast-fragmentation	9.4 kg (21 lb) WDU-17/B annular blast-fragmentation	Annular blast-fragmentation	Annular blast-fragmentation
Fuze	IR/Laser	IR/Laser	IR/Laser	IR/Laser
Powerplant
Manufacturer	Hercules/Bermite	MTI/Hercules	Hercules/Aerojet	MTI/Hercules
Type	Mk.36 Mod.7,8	Mk.36 Mod.9	SR.116	Mk.36 Mod.9
Launcher	Common	Common	Common	Common
Missile dimensions
Length	2.89 m (9.5 ft)	2.89 m (9.5 ft)	3 m (9.8 ft)	2.89 m (9.5 ft)
Span	0.64 m (2.1 ft)	0.64 m (2.1 ft)	0.58 m (1.9 ft)	0.64 m (2.1 ft)
Weight	86 kg (190 lb)	86 kg (190 lb)	86 kg (190 lb)	86 kg (190 lb)

AIM-9 all Variants

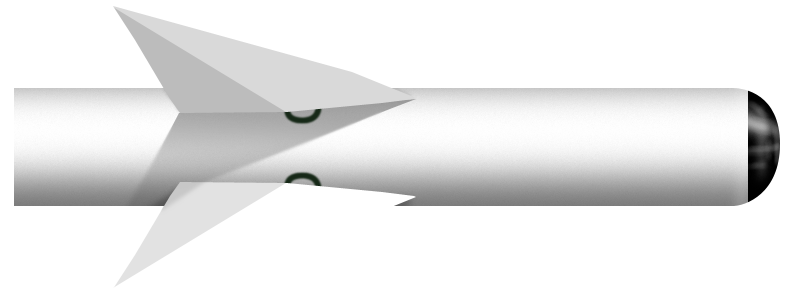
AIM-9B

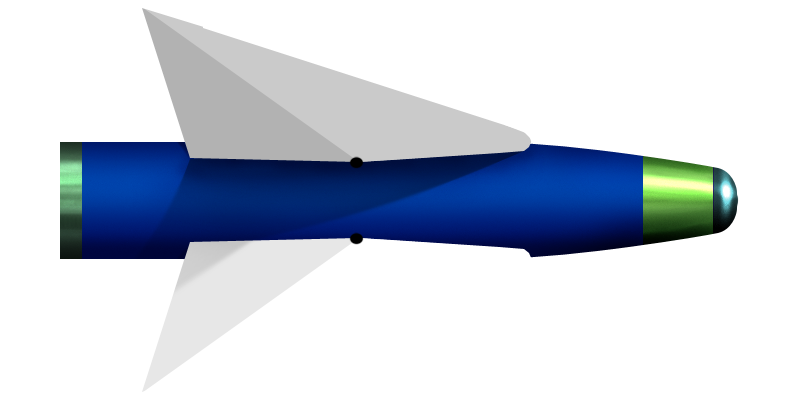
AIM-9D

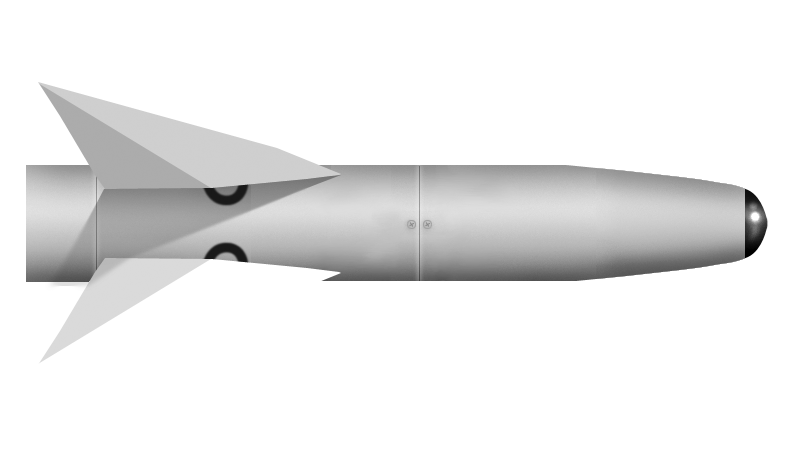
AIM-9E

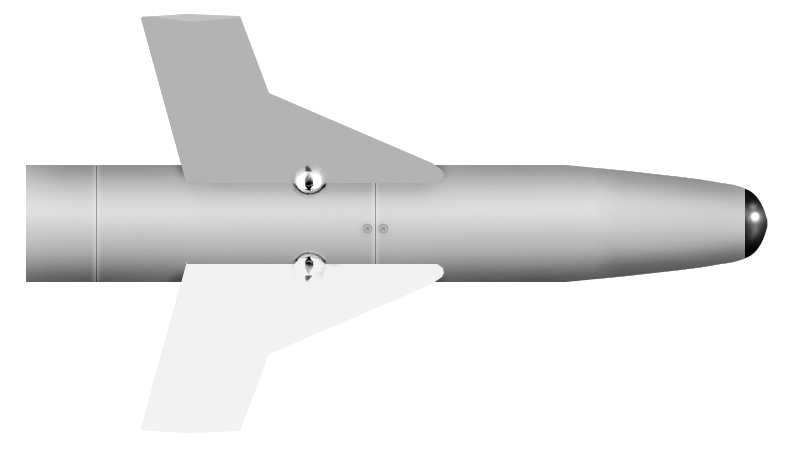
AIM-9J

AIM-9L

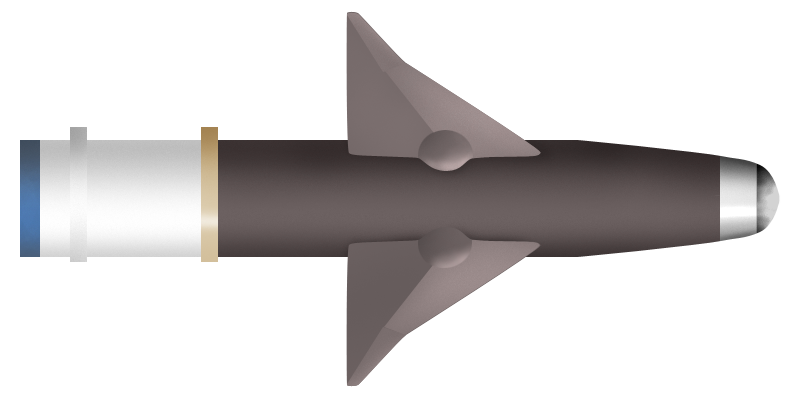
AIM-9M

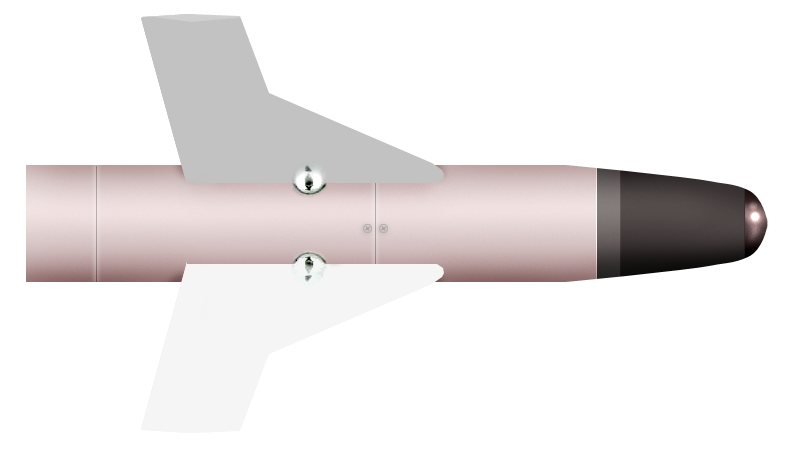
AIM-9P

== Combat ==
=== Combat debut: Taiwan Strait, 1958 ===
The first combat use of the Sidewinder came on 24 September 1958 by the Republic of China (Taiwan) Air Force during the Second Taiwan Strait Crisis. At the time, ROCAF North American F-86 Sabres were routinely engaged in air battles with the People's Republic of China over the Taiwan Strait. In similar fashion to Korean War encounters between the F-86 and earlier MiG-15, high-flying PRC MiG-17s cruised above the ROC Sabres, immune to their .50-cal guns and only fighting when conditions favored them.

In a highly secret effort, the United States provided a few dozen Sidewinders to ROC forces and an Aviation Ordnance Team from the U.S. Marine Corps to modify their aircraft to carry the Sidewinder. In the first encounter on 24 September 1958, ROCAF pilots used the Sidewinders to ambush the MiG-17s as they flew past. This action marked the first successful use of air-to-air missiles in combat, the downed MiGs being the first casualties.

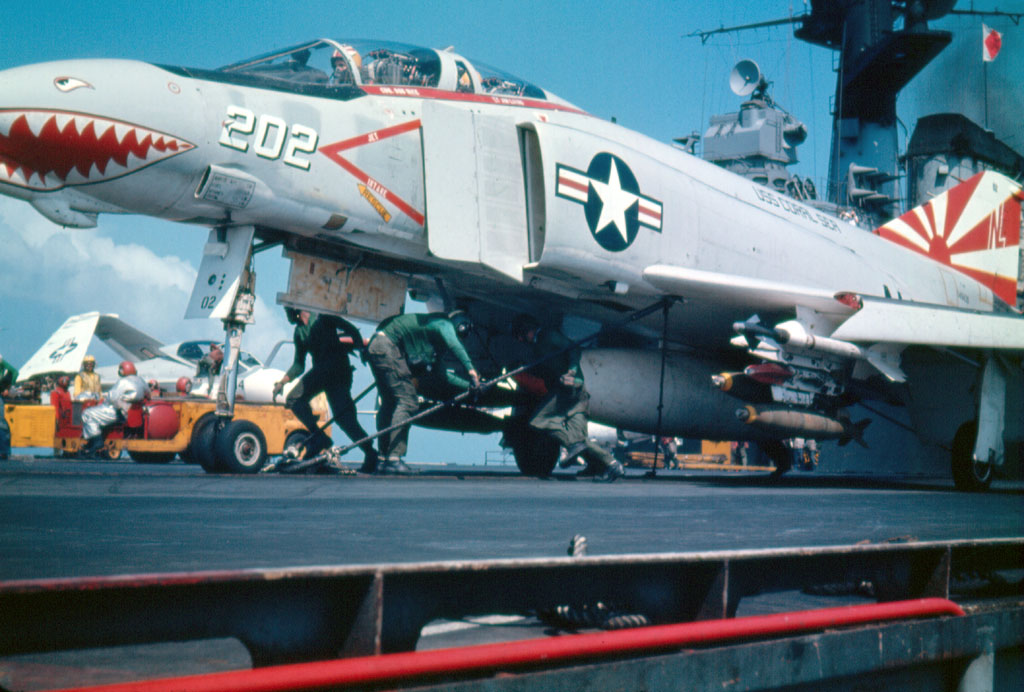
AIM-9D-armed F-4B 202 of VF-111 on USS Coral Sea, 1971~1972

During the Taiwan Strait battles of 1958, a ROCAF AIM-9B hit a PLAAF MiG-17 without exploding; the missile lodged in the airframe of the MiG and allowed the pilot to bring both plane and missile back to base. Soviet engineers later said that the captured Sidewinder served as a "university course" in missile design and substantially improved Soviet air-to-air capabilities. They reverse-engineered a copy of the Sidewinder, which was manufactured as the Vympel K-13/R-3S missile, NATO reporting name AA-2 Atoll. The Vympel K-13 entered service with Soviet air forces in 1960.

=== Vietnam War service 1965–1973 ===
Performance of the 454 Sidewinders launched during the war was not as satisfactory as hoped. Both the USN and USAF studied the performance of their aircrews, aircraft, weapons, training, and supporting infrastructure. The USAF conducted the classified Red Baron Report while the Navy conducted a study concentrating primarily on performance of air-to-air weapons that was informally known as the "Ault Report". Both services subsequently modified their AIM-9s to improve performance and reliability.

==== Vietnam War AIM-9 claimed aerial combat kills ====
U.S. Navy AIM-9 Sidewinder aerial combat kills
Missile firing aircraft	AIM-9 Sidewinder model (type)	Aircraft downed	Comments
F-8E Crusader	AIM-9D	(1) MiG-21 (9) MiG-17s	US fighters launched from US aircraft carriers; USS Hancock, USS Oriskany, USS Bon Homme Richard, USS Ticonderoga
F-8C	AIM-9D	(3) MiG-17s (1) MiG-21	US fighters launched from USS Bon Homme Richard and USS Intrepid
F-8H	AIM-9D	(2) MiG-21s	US fighters launched from USS Bon Homme Richard
F-4B Phantom II	AIM-9D	(2) MiG-17s (2) MiG-21s	US fighters launched from USS Constellation and USS Kitty Hawk
F-4J	AIM-9D	(2) MiG-21s	US fighters launched from USS America and USS Constellation
F-4B	AIM-9B	(1) MiG-17	US fighters launched from USS Kitty Hawk
F-4B	AIM-9D	(7) MiG-17s (2) MiG-19s	Fighters launched from USS Coral Sea and USS Midway
F-4J	AIM-9G	(7) MiG-17s (7) MiG-21s	Fighters launched from USS Enterprise, USS America, USS Saratoga, USS Constellation, USS Kitty Hawk
Total MiG-17s		29	
Total MiG-21s		15	
Total MiG-19s		2	
USN Total:		46	

U.S. Air Force AIM-9 Sidewinder aerial combat kills
Missile firing aircraft	AIM-9 Sidewinder model (type)	Aircraft downed	Comments
F-4C	AIM-9B	(13) MiG-17s (9) MiG-21s	USAF 45th Tactical Fighter Squadron (TFS), 389th TFS, 390th TFS, 433rd TFS, 480th TFS, 555th TFS
F-105D Thunderchief	AIM-9B	(3) MiG-17s	333rd TFS, 469th TFS
F-4D	AIM-9E	(2) MiG-21s	13th, 469th TFS
F-4E	AIM-9E	(4) MiG-21s	13th TFS, 34th TFS, 35th TFS, 469th TFS
F-4D	AIM-9J	(2) MiG-19s (1) MiG-21	523rd TFS, 555th TFS
Total MiG-17s		16	
Total MiG-21s		16	
Total MiG-19s		2	
USAF Total:		34	

In total 452 Sidewinders were fired during the Vietnam War, resulting in a kill probability of 18%.

The Services and the Department of Defense were shocked by the poor missile performance - pre-war operational tests predicted that the AIM-9 was expected to hit 65% of the time. The missile testing program, however, did not reflect how the missiles would be used. Almost all the tests were against non-maneuvering drone targets at high altitudes, many of them with artificially strengthened radar returns.

=== 1982 Falklands War ===
The United States Air Force sold the United Kingdom 200 AIM‑9L Sidewinder missiles for use on Harrier aircraft during the Falklands War.

The Royal Navy's Sea Harriers made extensive use of the missile's all‑aspect capability. Contemporary sources agree that 24 AIM‑9Ls were launched by Sea Harriers operating from Hermes and HMS Invincible, with 21 striking their targets, giving an overall hit rate of 88 per cent. Of the three unsuccessful firings, one was launched beyond its seeker's effective range, one suffered a malfunction, and one failed after the target escaped into cloud cover.

Sea Harriers armed with AIM‑9Ls destroyed 19 Argentine aircraft in air‑to‑air combat, including one later shot down by Argentine ground fire after being damaged. Two of the destroyed aircraft were each hit by two missiles. The missile's infrared seeker proved especially effective against the hot exhaust of Argentine jets against the cold South Atlantic skies.

Argentine Aircraft Lost to AIM‑9L Sidewinders – Falklands War, 1982
Date	Aircraft lost	Pilot	Location
1 May 1982	Mirage IIIEA	Lt Perona	North of West Falkland
1 May 1982	Mirage IIIEA	Capt Cuerva †	Damaged, then shot down by own AAA over Stanley
1 May 1982	IAI Dagger A	Lt Ardiles †	East Falkland
1 May 1982	Canberra B.62	Lt Ibanez †, Lt Gonzalez †	North of Falklands 2 missiles launched
21 May 1982	A‑4C Skyhawk	Lt Lopez †	Chartres, West Falkland
21 May 1982	A‑4C Skyhawk	Lt Manzotti †	Chartres, West Falkland
21 May 1982	IAI Dagger A	Lt Luna	Teal River Inlet, West Falkland
Three IAI Dagger A lost in the same sortie North of Port Howard, 21 May 1982
21 May 1982	IAI Dagger A	Maj Piuma	North of Port Howard
21 May 1982	IAI Dagger A	Capt Donaldille	North of Port Howard
21 May 1982	IAI Dagger A	Lt Senn	North of Port Howard
21 May 1982	A‑4Q Skyhawk	Lt Cmdr Philippi	Swan Island
23 May 1982	IAI Dagger A	Lt Volponi †	Pebble Island
Three IAI Dagger A lost in the same sortie north of Pebble Island, 24 May 1982
24 May 1982	IAI Dagger A	Maj Puga	North of Pebble Island
24 May 1982	IAI Dagger A	Capt Diaz	North of Pebble Island
24 May 1982	IAI Dagger A	Lt Castillo †	North of Pebble Island
1 June 1982	Hercules C.130E	Crew of 7 †	North of Pebble Island, 2 missiles +30mm Cannon
Three A‑4B Skyhawk lost in the same sortie over Choiseul Sound, 8 June 1982
8 June 1982	A‑4B Skyhawk	Lt Arraras †	Choiseul Sound
8 June 1982	A‑4B Skyhawk	Lt Bolzan †	Choiseul Sound
8 June 1982	A‑4B Skyhawk	Ensign Vazquez †	Choiseul Sound
Total			19

=== Bosnian War ===
On 24 February 1994, three aircraft of the Republika Srpska Air Force were intercepted by USAF F-16s and shot down with Sidewinders after violating the no-fly zone in Bosnia.

=== 2023 North American balloon and unidentified object shootdowns ===
On 4 February 2023, an F-22 Raptor operated by the United States Air Force used a single AIM-9X missile to shoot down a suspected Chinese spy balloon off the coast of Surfside Beach, South Carolina at an altitude between 60,000 to 65,000 feet (18,000 to 20,000 m). Six days later, another object was shot down near Alaska. On 11 and 12 February two more objects were shot down, over Yukon, Canada and Lake Huron in Michigan respectively.

=== 2023 Israel–Gaza war ===
On 2 November 2023, the Israeli Air Force claimed one of its F-35I shot down an unidentified cruise missile using an AIM-9X Sidewinder.

=== Russian invasion of Ukraine ===
On 3 May 2025, the head of the Ukrainian Main Directorate of Intelligence (HUR), lieutenant general Kyrylo Budanov claimed that three MAGURA V7 naval drones armed with AIM-9 Sidewinders modified for surface-to-air operation shot down two Russian Su-30 fighter jets in the Black Sea. The Russian Defense Ministry did not comment, but Russian sources report that the pilots of one fighter were rescued by a cargo ship, whose crew received an award.

On September 18, 2025, during a massive missile-drone attack, a video surfaced on social networks showing an F-16 of the Ukrainian Air Force shooting down a Russian Shahed-136 kamikaze drone with an AIM-9L missile.

Between 24 and 26 July 2026, Romanian Air Force F-16s used AIM-9X Sidewinder missiles to shoot down three Russian drones which entered Romanian airspace. First drone was shot down after flying 80 minutes over Romanian territory, second drone was downed in 11 minutes, and the third drone in 5 minutes.

=== 2026 Iran War ===
In a friendly fire incident on March 1, 2026, three USAF F-15E Strike Eagles were shot down by an F/A-18C Hornet of the Kuwait Air Force armed with AIM-9M and AIM-9X missiles.

== Sidewinder descendants ==
=== Anti-tank variants ===
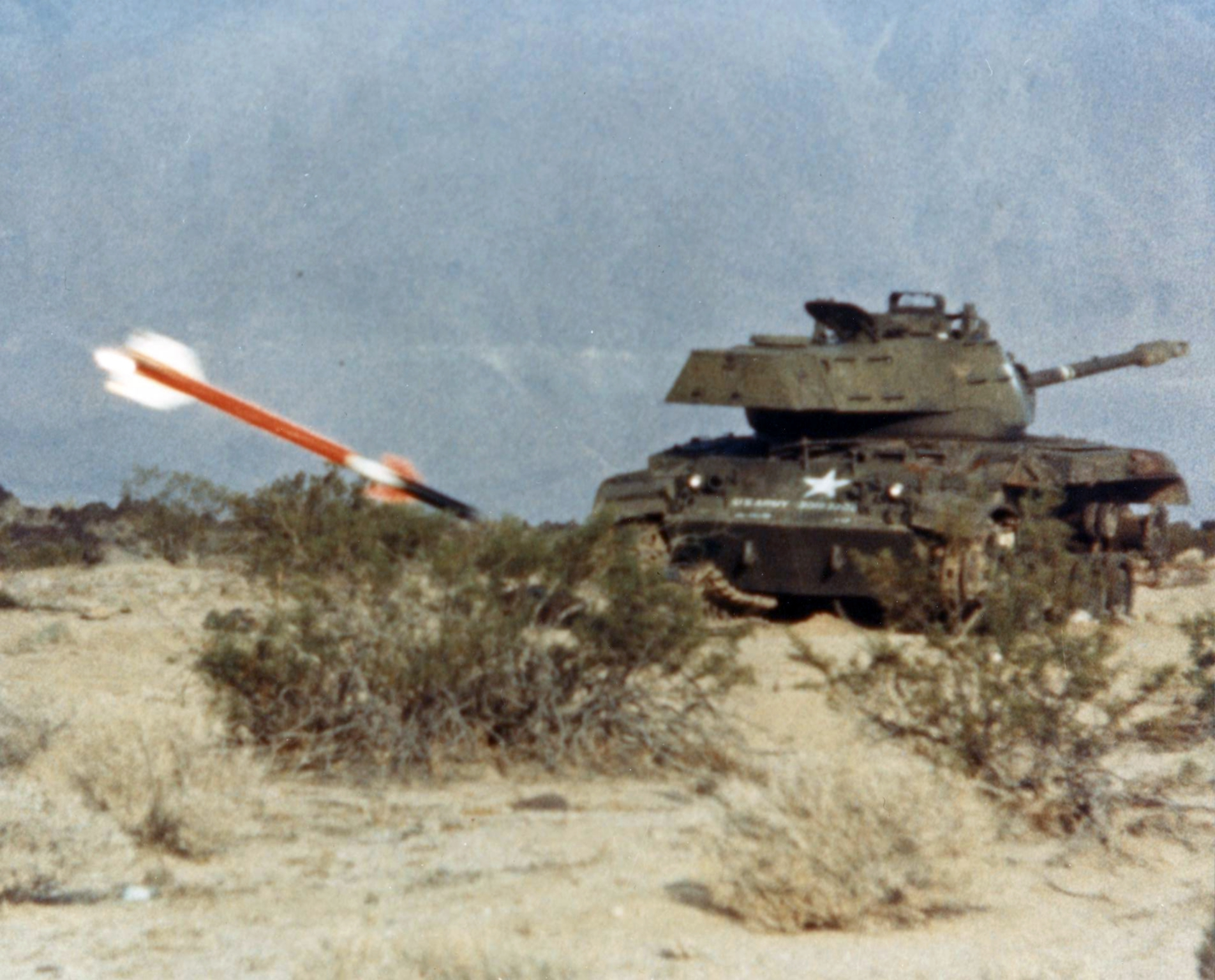
Experimental use of an AGM-87 against an M41 Walker Bulldog at China Lake, 1971

Naval Air Weapons Station China Lake experimented with Sidewinders in the air-to-ground mode including use as an anti-tank weapon. Starting from 2008, the AIM-9X demonstrated its ability as a successful light air-to-ground missile.

In 2016, Diehl closed a deal with the Federal Office of Bundeswehr Equipment, Information Technology and In-Service Support to develop a laser guided Air-To-Ground variant of the Sidewinder missile based on the AIM-9L variant. In testing with the Swedish Defence Materiel Administration a Saab JAS 39 Gripen could hit one stationary and two moving targets.

On 28 February 2018, the Iranian Islamic Revolutionary Guard Corps unveiled an anti-tank derivative of the Sidewinder missile named "Azarakhsh" intended for use by Bell AH-1J SeaCobra attack helicopters.

== Later developments ==
=== High Altitude Project (HAP) ===
Under the High Altitude Project, engineers at China Lake mated a Sidewinder warhead and seeker to a Sparrow rocket motor to experiment with usefulness of a larger motor, giving it a longer range. This was intended to provide the F-4 Phantom II the capability to intercept the Mikoyan MiG-25; eight prototype missiles were built.

=== Other ground launch platforms ===
==== MIM-72 Chaparral ====
The MIM-72 Chaparral is an American-made self-propelled surface-to-air missile (SAM) based on the AIM-9 Sidewinder air-to-air missile system.

==== MIM-72 Variants ====
- MIM-72A (USAF): missile was based on the AIM-9D Sidewinder. The main difference is that to reduce drag only two of the fins on the MIM-72A have rollerons, the other two having been replaced by fixed thin fins. The MIM-72's MK 50 solid-fuel rocket motor was essentially identical to the MK 36 MOD 5 used in the AIM-9D Sidewinder.
- MIM-72B (USAF): It was a training missile with the radar fuze replaced with an IR model for use against target drones.
- MIM-72C Improved Chaparral (USAF): The MIM-72C used the advanced AN/DAW-1B seeker with all-aspect capability, as well as a new doppler radar fuze and M250 blast-frag warhead. The fuze and warhead were adapted from the earlier Mauler program. C models were deployed between 1976 and 1981, reaching operational status in 1978.
- MIM-72D: The MIM-72D was built for export, combining the seeker of the "A" with the improved M250 warhead.
- MIM-72E (USAF): MIM-72C missiles retrofitted with a new M121 smokeless motor, which greatly reduced the smoke generated on firing allowing for easier follow-up shots and making it harder for enemy aircraft to find the launch site.
- MIM-72F: It was an export model, being virtually identical to the MIM-72E, just being newly built .
- MIM-72G (USAF): This was the final upgrade to the MIM-72, fitting the missile with the new AN/DAW-2 rosette scan seeker based on the seeker in the FIM-92 Stinger POST, offering a larger field of view and improved resistance to countermeasures. This was retrofitted to all Chaparral missiles during the late 1980s, and was produced between 1990 and 1991.
- MIM-72H Is an export version of the MIM-72F
- MIM-72J is an MIM-72G with a downgraded guidance and control section, and was also intended for export.
- MIM-72 Derivatives:
- RIM-72C Sea Chaparral (USN): A naval version of the MIM-72 was also developed, based on the C version of the missile, it was evaluated but not deployed by the US Navy. However it was exported and adopted by Taiwan.
- M30: Inert training missile based on MIM-72A, replicating a live "A" using the original Mk28 seeker head.
- M33: Inert training version of MIM-72C, replicating the "C" and later and was fitted with the AN/DAW series of seekers.

==== AIM-9X MML ====
In 2016, the AIM-9X was test fired from a Multi-Mission Launcher at the White Sands Missile Range in New Mexico, USA. During testing with the MML, the AIM-9X experienced issues with overheating. These issues have since been resolved. In September 2021, the U.S. Army signed a contract with Dynetics to build prototypes for its Indirect Fires Protection Capability (IFPC), using an MML-based launcher firing the Sidewinder to counter UAVs and cruise missiles. It is planned to be put into service in 2023.

==== AIM-9X NASAMS ====
In May 2019, the AIM-9X Block II was test fired from the National Advanced Surface to Air Missile System (NASAMS) at the Andøya Space Center in Norway.

==== FrankenSAM ====
In late 2022, the United States and Ukraine began working on a program to adapt older AIM-9M Sidewinders into surface to air missiles, as part of a wider program known as "FrankenSAM", in an attempt to better protect Ukraine against Russian airstrikes of critical power infrastructure during the Russo-Ukrainian War. On 24 October 2023, a Ukrainian official said: "Those [AIM-9] missiles were out of operation...We found a way of launching them [Sidewinders] from the ground. It's a kind of self-made air defence."

=== Naval drone platforms ===
According to Budanov, the HUR began development on a MAGURA V5 unmanned surface vehicle armed with AIM-9 Sidewinders in January 2025. He also told the War Zone that "We use a couple of models [of missiles] on our Magura-7, but the best results [come from] the AIM-9."

== Operators ==
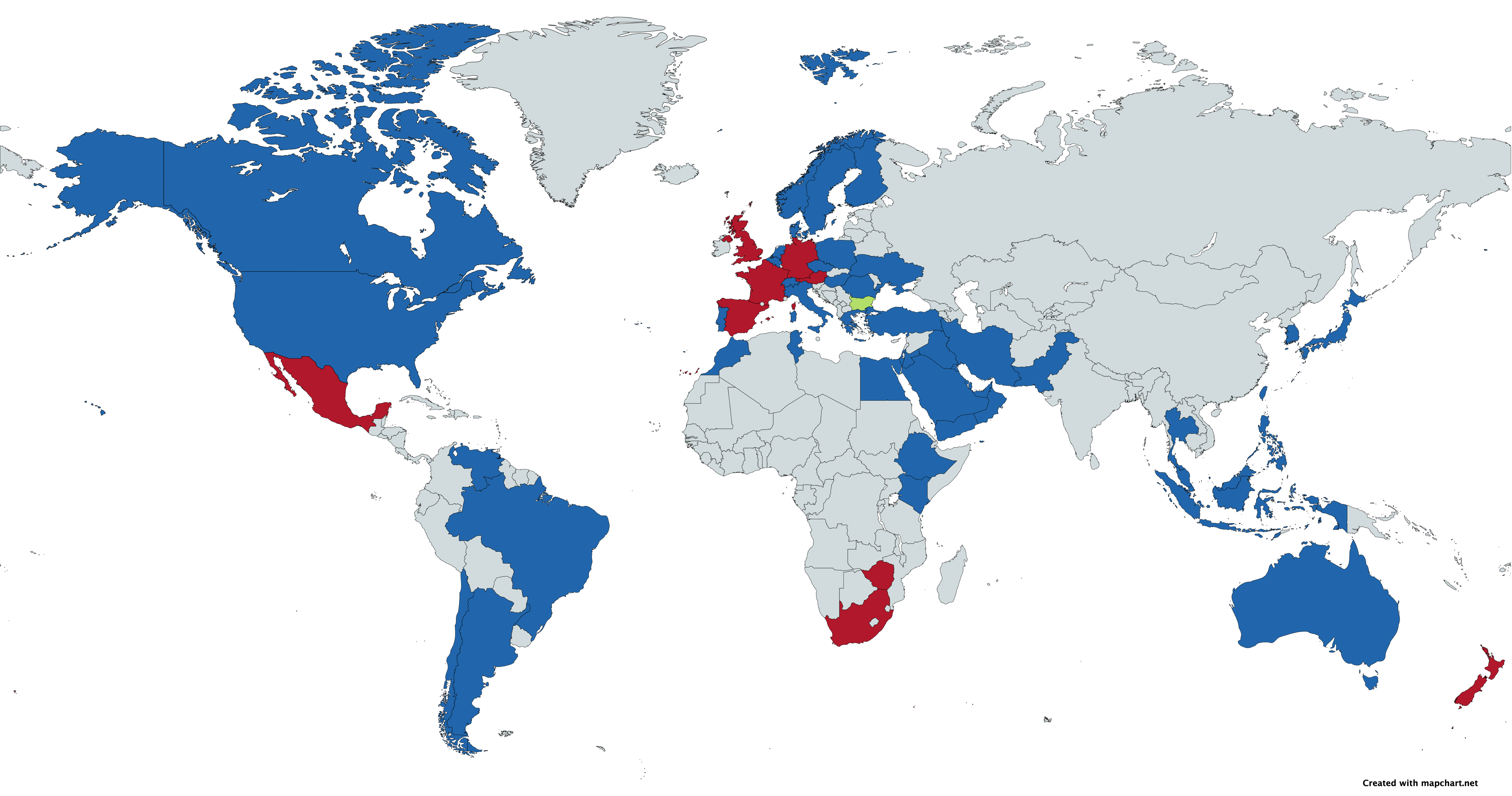
Operators of the AIM-9 Sidewinder Current Former Future

=== Current operators ===
- Argentina: AIM-9L/M
- Australia
- Belgium
- Bahrain
- El Salvador
- Canada: AIM-9M/9X block II/block II+
- Chile
- Czech Republic
- Denmark
- Egypt
- Ethiopia
- Finland
- Hungary
- Greece
- Germany: AIM-9L/I
- Indonesia
- Iran
- Iraq
- Israel
- Italy
- Japan
- Jordan
- Kenya
- Kuwait
- Lithuania: AIM-9X Block II
- Malaysia
- Mexico
- Morocco

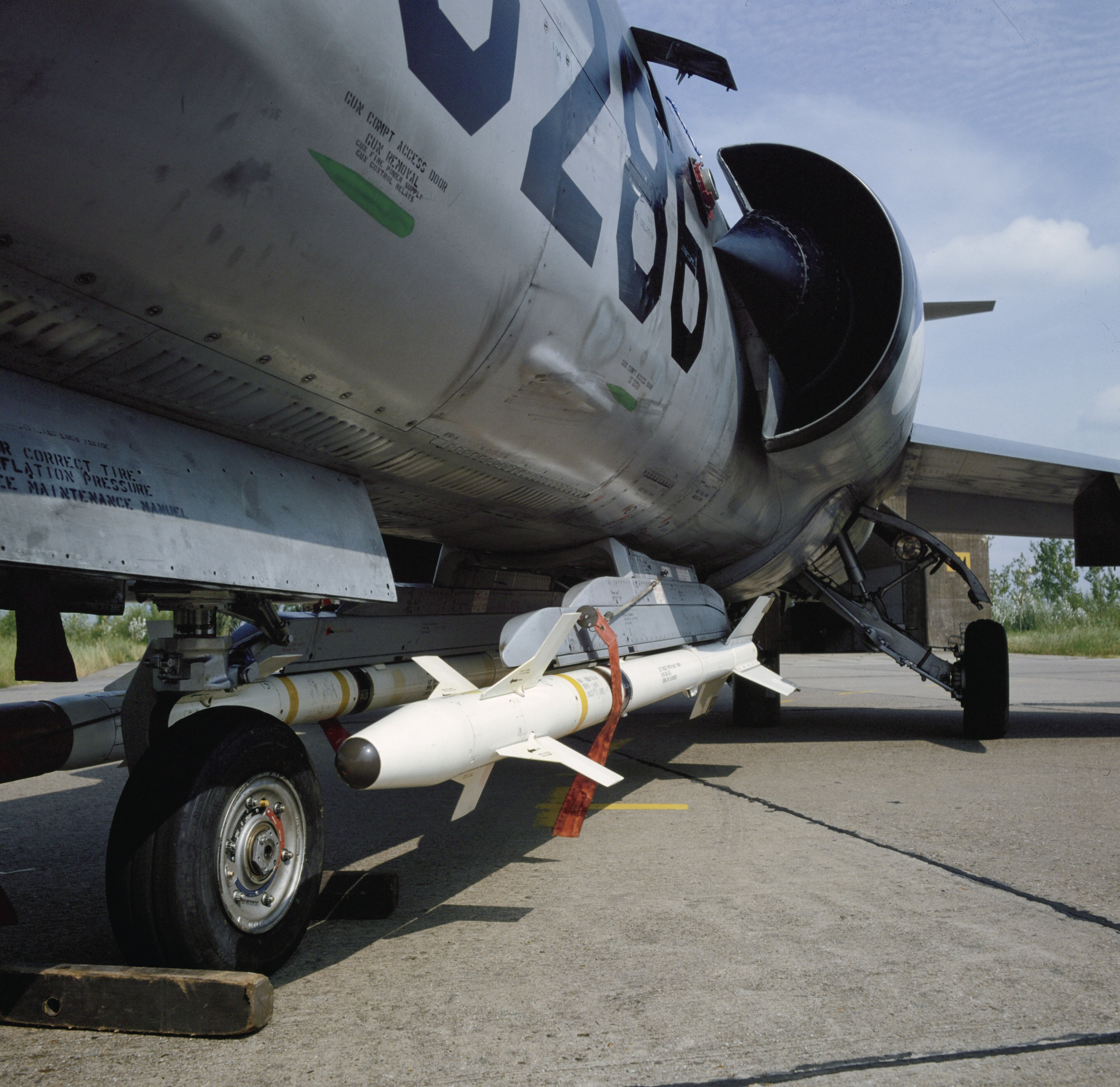
The rear-aspect only AIM-9J carried by a Dutch F-104G Starfighter in 1979.

- Netherlands
- Norway
- Oman
- Pakistan
- Philippines: AIM-9B/L
- Poland
- Portugal: AIM-9B/J/P/L/M/9X Block II
- Qatar
- Romania
- Saudi Arabia
- Singapore
- Slovakia: Ordered 98 AIM-9X Block II for their F-16 Block 70 in a later contract.
- South Korea
- Republic of China (Taiwan)
- Sweden
- Switzerland
- Thailand
- Turkey: 127 AIM-9X-BII Sidewinder in inventory and 401 AIM-9X-BII Sidewinder on order.
- Tunisia
- United States
- UAE
- Ukraine: 43 missiles donated by Canada from the stocks of the Canadian Armed Forces. The variant was not stated nor if they were to be used by Ukrainian Air Force's fighters or the ground defenses like the NASAMS. Unknown number of AIM-9Ms donated by the United States in August 2023.
- Venezuela
- Yemen

=== Former operators ===
- Austria
- Brazil: AIM-9B, AIM-9H
- France
- New Zealand
- North Yemen
- South Africa
- South Vietnam
- Spain
- United Kingdom
- Yugoslavia
- Zimbabwe

=== Future operators ===
- Bulgaria: Bulgarian Air Force F-16 Block 70 Aircraft are going to be armed with AIM-9X Block II missiles.
- Germany: AIM-9X

Please note that this list is not definitive.

== See also ==
- 1963 United States Tri-Service rocket and guided missile designation system

Related development

- AGM-87 Focus, an infrared-homing, air-to-ground version of the Sidewinder
- AGM-122 Sidearm, an anti-radiation missile based on the Sidewinder
- Diamondback, a proposed enlarged, nuclear-armed version of Sidewinder
- PL-2, a Chinese derivative of the K-13 (AA-2 Atoll)
- MIM-72 Chaparral
- Sidewinder Arcas

Related lists

- List of missiles

=== Comparable missiles ===
- ASRAAM – (United Kingdom)
- A-Darter – (South Africa)
- Bozdoğan – (Turkey)
- IRIS-T – (Germany, Italy, Sweden, Greece)
- MAA-1 Piranha – (Brazil)
- MICA – (France)
- R.550 Magic – (France)
- Red Top – (United Kingdom)
- Firestreak – (United Kingdom)
- PL-9 – (China)
- PL-10 – (China)
- Python 5 – (Israel)
- R-60 – (Soviet Union)
- R-73 – (Soviet Union)
- Shafrir – (Israel)
- Fatter – (Iran)
- Sky Sword I – (Taiwan)
- AAM-1/3/5 – (Japan)
