= AGM-122 Sidearm =

American air-to-surface anti-radiation missile

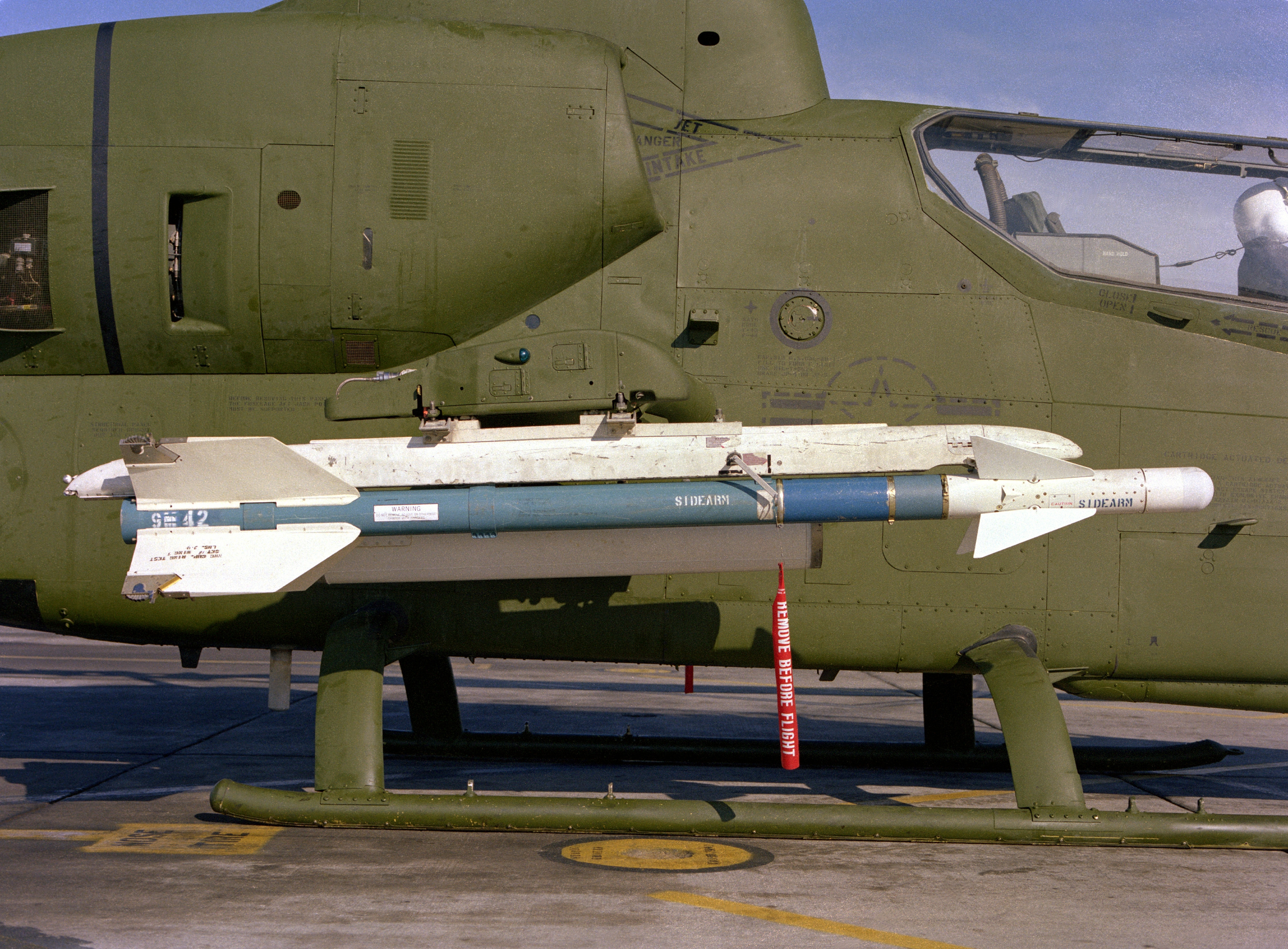
- An AGM-122 Sidearm missile on a US Marine Corps Bell AH-1T SeaCobra helicopter in 1981
- Type: Air-to-surface; Anti-radar missile
- Place of origin: United States

Service history
- In service: 1986

Production history
- Manufacturer: Motorola

Specifications
- Mass: 195 lb (88.5 kg)
- Length: 9 ft 5 in (2.870 m)
- Diameter: 5 in (127.0 mm)
- Wingspan: 24.8 in (629.9 mm)
- Warhead: 25 lb (11.3 kg) WDU-31/B blast-fragmentation
- Engine: Hercules Mk 36 Mod 11 solid fuel rocket
- Operational range: 18,044 yd (16.5 km)
- Maximum speed: Mach 2.3
- Guidance system: Narrow-band passive radar seeker
- Launch platform: AV-8B Harrier II; AH-1 SuperCobra; AH-64 Apache; Other aircraft

The AGM-122 Sidearm was an American air-to-surface anti-radiation missile produced between 1986 and 1990. While not as capable as newer anti-radiation missiles, they were cheaper and lighter in weight allowing more versatile deployment.

== Development ==
The AGM-122 Sidearm was produced by the re-manufacture of AIM-9C missiles that had been taken out of service. The AIM-9C was a semi-active radar homing variant of the Sidewinder, developed for the US Navy's Vought F-8 Crusader, but used for only a limited period of time. Conceived and developed at China Lake NAWS, the Sidearm was first tested in 1981. In 1984, Motorola was issued a contract to convert and upgrade AIM-9Cs to the AGM-122A standard. A total of about 700 units were produced between 1986 and 1990.

Existing stocks of Sidearm have been depleted, and the missile is no longer in service. Proposals for new-build missiles, under the designation AGM-122B, have not been proceeded with to date.

The AGM-122 was less capable than newer anti-radiation missiles, such as the AGM-88 HARM, but also substantially cheaper, and its lighter weight enabled it to be carried by combat helicopters as well as fighter aircraft and fighter bombers. The missile was primarily fielded aboard Marine Corps AH-1T/W Sea Cobra attack helicopters, and Marine Corps AV-8B Harrier II jump jets, and could take the place of self-defense air to air missiles. The weapon retained the same warhead of the AIM-9C, which gave it a fairly limited destructive ability against armored vehicles. However, due to the nature of radiation homing missiles, the AGM-122 aimed for the radar emitter directly, all but guaranteeing the operational elimination of the target.

The Sidearm was primarily intended for use against short-range radar guided anti-aircraft artillery and shorter range SAMs, including those fired by vehicles. The missile was capable of tracking a target even if it was moving.

== See also ==
- Air-to-ground missile (AGM)
- AIM-9 Sidewinder
- AGM-87 Focus
