= Fatter =

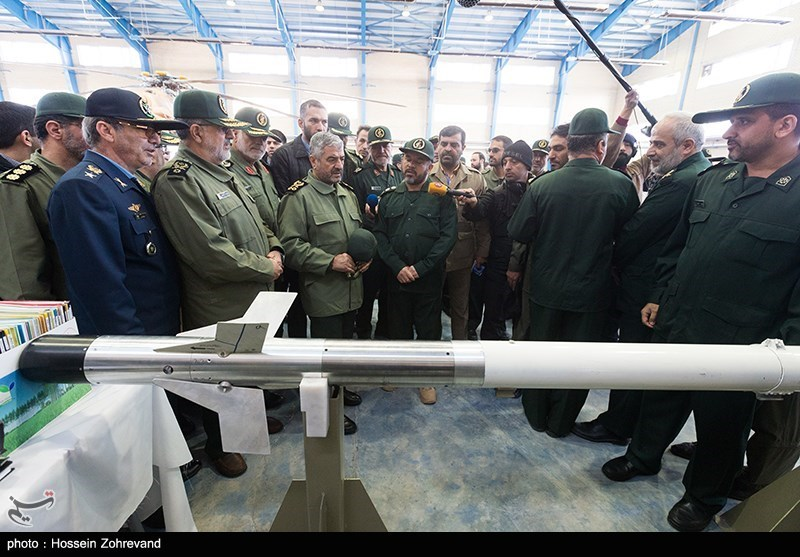
- Type: Short-range air-to-air missile
- Place of origin: Iran

Service history
- Used by: Iranian Air Force

Production history
- Produced: Since 2009

Specifications
- Diameter: 127 mm
- Detonation mechanism: Proximity fuse
- Propellant: solid rocket fuel
- Operational range: 40km
- Maximum speed: 2.5 Mach
- Guidance system: Infrared homing
- Launch platform: Aircraft

Fatter (Persian: فاطر, lit. 'Creator') is an Iranian short-range air-to-air missile based on the U.S.-built AIM-9 Sidewinder missile.

== Development ==
Fatter is a short range missile which uses an AIM-9 Sidewinder missile body and Iranian avionics. In 2008 the Islamic Republic of Iran Air Force (IRIAF) reported test launches of a new IR-guided missile that was identified as the Fatter. IRIAF Commander Brigadier General Hassan Shahsafi told news agencies that the missile had a range of 40 kilometers. In November 2009 Shahsafi told state TV that mass production of the missile was to be launched. No other information is available about the missile.

== Operators ==
- Iran
