= AGM-87 Focus =

United States Navy air-to-surface missile

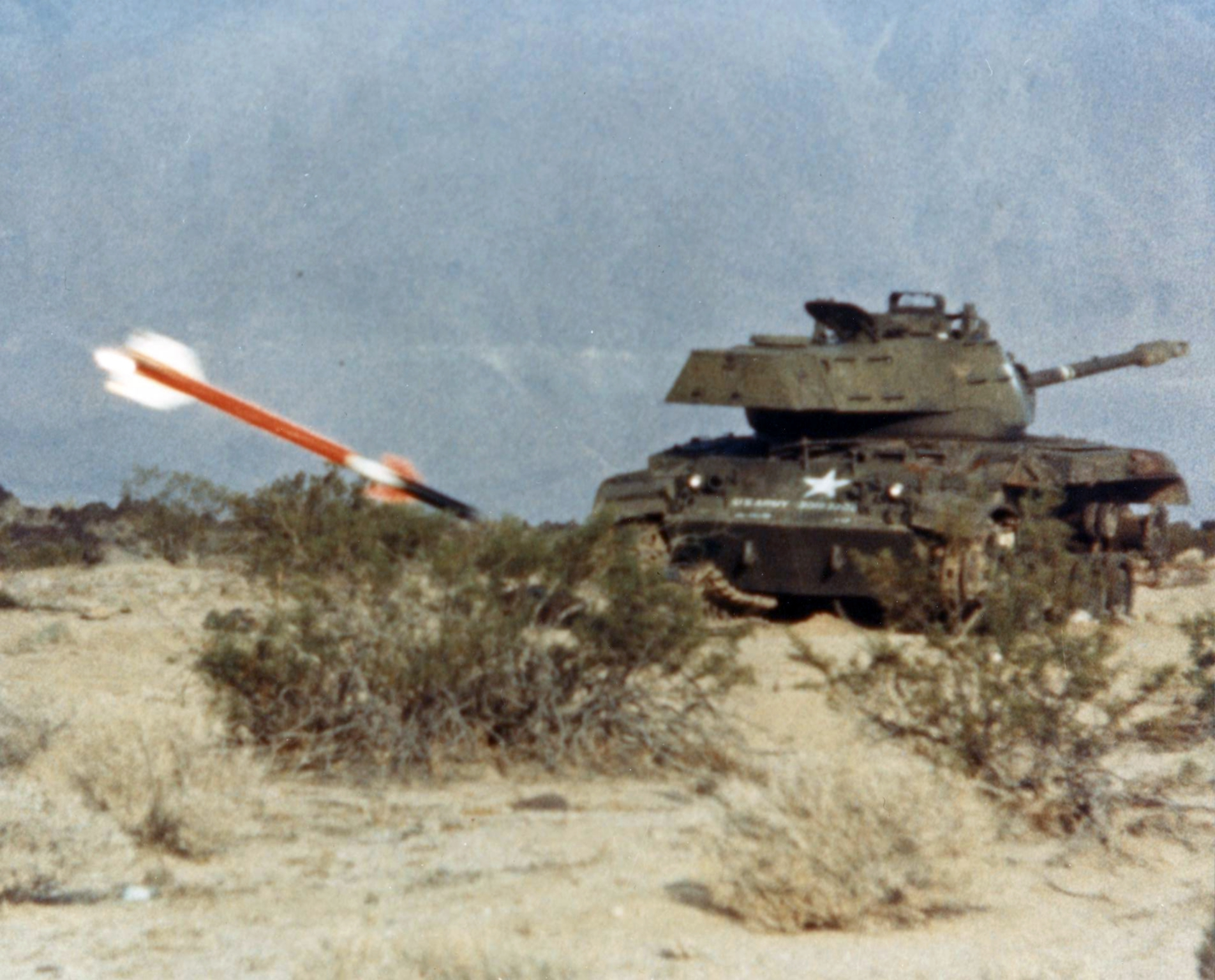
AGM-87 fired at an M41 Walker Bulldog at China Lake, 1971

The AGM-87 Focus was an air-to-surface missile developed by the United States.

== Overview ==
The missile was a development of the AIM-9B Sidewinder air-to-air missile, intended for use against ground targets. Development took place at the China Lake Naval Weapons Center during the late 1960s. The infrared homing method of the Sidewinder was retained, as the missile was to be used against targets which emitted an infrared signature. Typical targets included trucks and other such vehicles.

The Focus was used in Vietnam during 1969 and 1970, primarily for night attacks when IR emitters stand out well against the cool background. Although the missile was reportedly quite effective, it was discontinued in favor of other weapons.

== Specifications ==
- Length : 9 ft 3.5 in (2.83 m)
- Finspan : 1 ft 10 in (0.56 m)
- Diameter : 5 in (12.7 cm)
- Weight : 155 lb (70 kg)
- Propulsion : Thiokol MK 17 MOD 3 solid-fuel rocket
