= Rolleron =

Type of aileron used for missiles

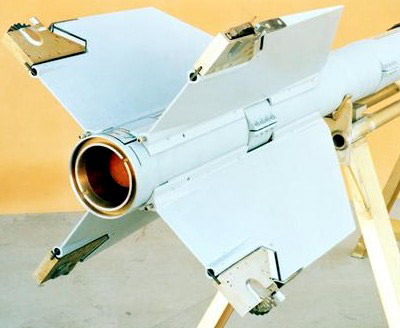
Rollerons on the trailing edge of the fins of the AIM-9 Sidewinder missile

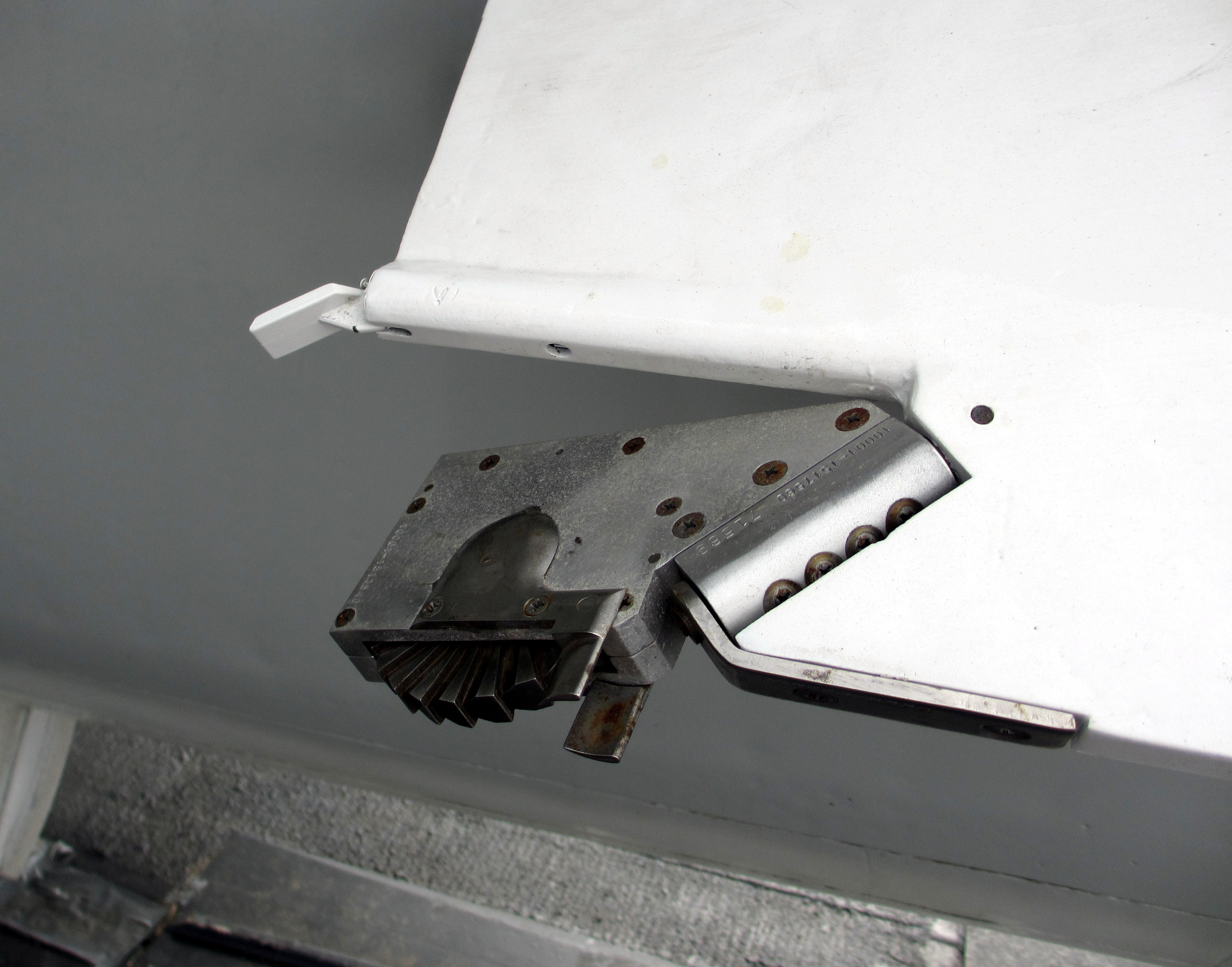
Detail of a rolleron on a Sidewinder

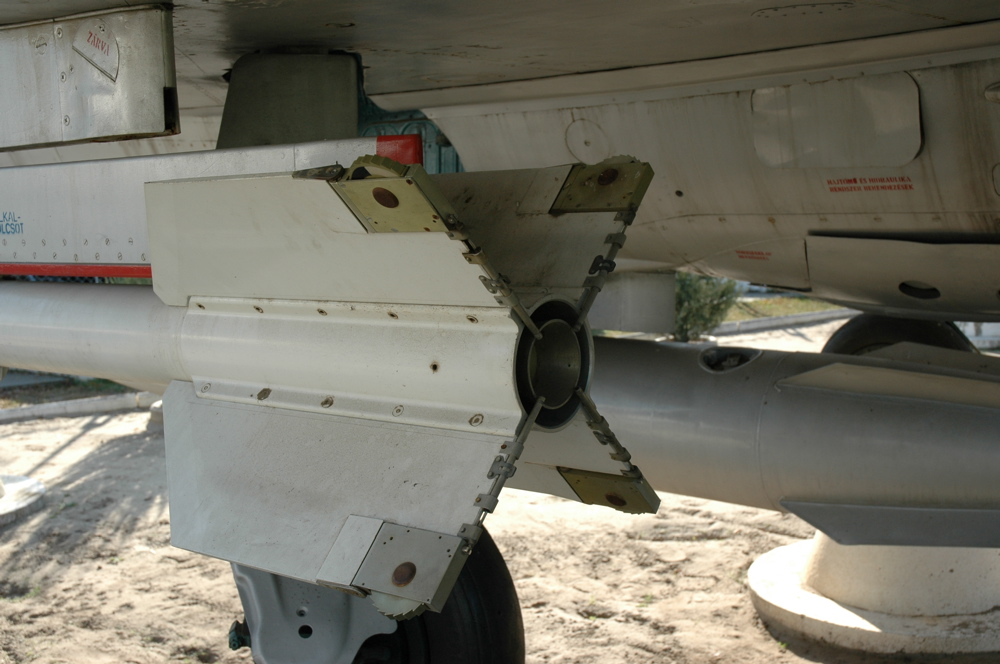
Rollerons on the fins of the K-13 missile

A rolleron is a type of aileron used for rockets and used to provide passive stabilization against rotation. While most commonly used to stabilize against roll, it can also be used for counteracting yaw and pitch as well.

In the early 1950s, the first rollerons were produced. Its value for the dynamic stabilization of missiles led to it being promptly studied by the National Advisory Committee for Aeronautics (NACA). It proved to be a more compact, simpler, and reliable solution to controlling roll than preceding methods, such as the combination of servomechanisms and ailerons. Rolleron devices have been widely used on maneuverable close-range air-to-air missiles, such as the prolific AIM-9 Sidewinder. Rocket vehicles have also become another common application.

== History ==
During the early 1950s, the first examples of the rolleron, sometimes initially referred to as a roll damper, emerged. Due to its potential value as a missile stabilization device it was quickly subject to in-depth evaluations by the National Advisory Committee for Aeronautics (NACA), and other organizations. The early missiles in use by the mid-1950s were typified by their limited damping of aerodynamic roll as a consequence of their low-aspect ratio lifting surfaces. The historic solution to this issue was to install a servomechanism to sense the roll rate and make adjustments to a conventional aileron as to counteract as required; this approach added complexity and weight, and took up limited space. Thus, less impinging methods were urgently sought, with a preference for those that required no internal component whatsoever.

By November 1956, NACA had determined the rolleron to have a reliable design approach for missile configurations. At the behest of the US military, further tests were conducted to validate its performance on production missiles. More generally, further innovations and patents associated with rollerons have been made over the following decades. Into the 1990s, the rolleron, along with potential applications for it, has continued to be examined by various organizations and nations.

== Function ==
The rolleron is a relatively simple and cost-effective stabilizing device. The core element of a rolleron is a metal flywheel that is typically positioned at the trailing end of a fin. The wheel has notches cut into its circumference; these notches intentionally protrude as to maximize their interaction with the airflow. As such, while the missile is in motion through the air, the resulting air current generated causes the rolleron to rotate. While spinning, the flywheel resists any lateral forces acting on it, in a manner similar to a gyroscope. The benefit of this gyroscopic motion is that it counteracts the missile's undesirable tendency to rotate about its central axis, dynamically stabilizing its flight. In addition to stabilizing against roll, a similar effect can also be provided for yaw and pitch as well.

Rollerons are also used on 9M31 and 9M37 surface to air missiles of Strela-1 and Strela-10 air defense systems, with former using wires wound on the flywheel discs to spin them on launch while the latter uses small gas generator to spin the discs shortly before launch.

Rollerons are valuable for missiles requiring a high level of maneuverability, as used in shorter-range dogfights between fighter aircraft.

An early adopter of the rolleron was the AIM-9 Sidewinder, a prominent air-to-air missile. Rollerons are present on all four of its rear wings. By eliminating roll tendencies, the rolleron makes it considerably easier for a missile to carry out its core functions, such as target tracking. The rolleron has also become a typical feature on rocket vehicles.

== Principles of operation ==
=== General ===
Rollerons and their respective angular velocities. Flywheels omitted for clarity.

The rolleron acts as a passive stabilizing system through gyroscopic precession. The angular momentum $\mathbf{L}$ of each rotating flywheel is defined as $\mathbf{L}=I\boldsymbol{\omega}$ where $I$ is the moment of inertia of the flywheel and $\boldsymbol{\omega}$ is its angular velocity.

When an angular velocity $\boldsymbol{\Omega}$ is applied to the missile, the rate of change of angular momentum required for the rolleron to remain fixed relative to the missile body is:

$$\boldsymbol{\tau}_{required} = \frac{\mathrm{d} \mathbf{L}}{\mathrm{d}t} = \boldsymbol{\Omega} \times\mathbf{L}$$

However, because the rolleron is mounted on a hinge and is free to rotate, the missile cannot transfer the required torque onto it. Instead, the rolleron exerts a reaction torque back onto the hinge:

$$\boldsymbol{\tau}= -\left(\boldsymbol{\Omega} \times\mathbf{L}\right)$$

This reaction torque $\boldsymbol{\tau}$ causes the rolleron to deflect into the airstream in such a way that the resulting aerodynamic forces produce a restoring moment on the rocket that opposes $\boldsymbol{\Omega}$.

In blue, roll disturbance and consequent rolleron deflections. Flywheels omitted for clarity.

=== Roll ===
In the case of a pure roll disturbance, $\boldsymbol{\Omega}$ is defined as $\boldsymbol{\Omega} = {\left[ p,0,0 \right]}^{\intercal} = p\hat{\boldsymbol{x}}$, and the angular velocities of the rollerons are defined as follows:

$$\begin{align}
&\boldsymbol{\omega}_1 = -\omega_1\hat{\boldsymbol{z}} && \boldsymbol{\omega}_3 = \omega_3\hat{\boldsymbol{z}}\\
&\boldsymbol{\omega}_2 = \omega_2\hat{\boldsymbol{y}} && \boldsymbol{\omega}_4 = -\omega_4\hat{\boldsymbol{y}}
\end{align}$$

The reaction torque for any rolleron $i$ is given by:

$$\boldsymbol{\tau}_i = -\left(\boldsymbol{\Omega} \times \mathbf{L}_i \right)$$

This results in:

$$\begin{align}
&\boldsymbol{\tau}_1 = -pI\omega_1\hat{\boldsymbol{y}} && \boldsymbol{\tau}_3 = pI\omega_3\hat{\boldsymbol{y}}\\
&\boldsymbol{\tau}_2 = -pI\omega_2\hat{\boldsymbol{z}} && \boldsymbol{\tau}_4 = pI\omega_4\hat{\boldsymbol{z}}
\end{align}$$

All rollerons are engaged by a roll disturbance.

Pitch and yaw disturbances and consequent rolleron deflections, in blue and orange respectively. Flywheels omitted for clarity.

=== Pitch and yaw ===
Placing the hinges along $\hat{\boldsymbol{y}}$ on fins 1 and 3, and along $\hat{\boldsymbol{z}}$ on fins 2 and 4, is sufficient for roll stabilization. However, canting them at 45°, thus introducing a component of the hinge axis along $\hat{\boldsymbol{x}}$, allows the rollerons to respond to pitch and yaw disturbances as well.

For a combined pitch-yaw disturbance, $\boldsymbol{\Omega}$ is defined as $\boldsymbol{\Omega} = {\left[ 0,q,r \right]}^{\intercal} = q\hat{\boldsymbol{y}} + r\hat{\boldsymbol{z}}$, thus:

$$\begin{align}
&\boldsymbol{\tau}_1 = qI\omega_1\hat{\boldsymbol{x}} && \boldsymbol{\tau}_3 = -qI\omega_3\hat{\boldsymbol{y}}\\
&\boldsymbol{\tau}_2 = rI\omega_2\hat{\boldsymbol{x}} && \boldsymbol{\tau}_4 = -rI\omega_4\hat{\boldsymbol{x}}
\end{align}$$

Pitch engages rollerons on fins 1 and 3, while yaw engages rollerons on fins 2 and 4.
