= AAM-3 =

Japanese air-to-air missile

Type 90 Air-to-Air Guided Missile
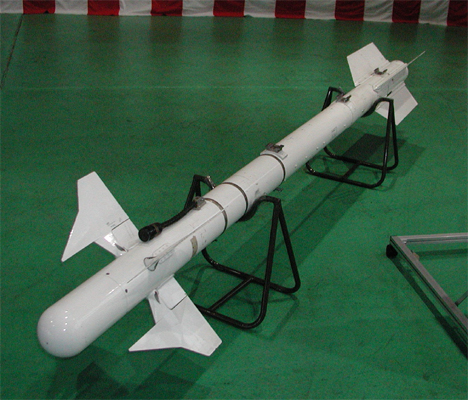
- Type: Short-range air-to-air missile
- Place of origin: Japan

Service history
- Used by: Japanese Air Self-Defence Force

Production history
- Manufacturer: Mitsubishi Heavy Industries
- Unit cost: US$90,000−150,000

Specifications
- Mass: 91 kilograms (200 pounds 10 ounces)
- Length: 3.1 metres (10 feet)
- Diameter: 127 millimetres (5.0 inches)
- Detonation mechanism: laser proximity
- Engine: solid fuel rocket motor
- Operational range: >13 kilometres (8.1 miles)
- Guidance system: dual wavelength light wave homing + infrared homing/ultraviolet homing, with infrared counter-counter-measures (IRCCM)
- Launch platform: Mitsubishi F-15J/DJ; Mitsubishi F-2; F-4EJ Kai

The Mitsubishi AAM-3 or Type 90 air-to-air missile (90式空対空誘導弾) is a short-range all-aspect air-to-air missile developed by Japan. It has been officially operated since 1991, and replaced the US AIM-9 Sidewinder.

Developed as a successor to the AIM-9L Sidewinder, the AAM-3 improved target acquisition and tracking capabilities through more sensitive temperature difference detection, and improved flight manoeuvrability of the missile itself. Research began as early as 1974, but full-scale development only began in 1986 and entered service in 1991 (Heisei 2).

== Development ==
In 1974, Japan began limited development of the AAM-3 as a project to replace the existing AIM-9 Sidewinders in Japanese service. The project was rather limited in budget due to the failure of the AAM-2. The project received a massive boost in development in the 1980s, driven by Japan's needs for more modern military equipment, rocketing the budget to nearly ¥12.2 billion ($77.3 million USD). The missile was required to be more capable than existing missiles in Japanese service. The final result came out in the 1990s as the AAM-3 entered service.

However, the AAM-3 was unable to replace the AIM-9s as the missile was nearly double the price of the Sidewinder. Due to this, the AAM-3 is expected to be replaced by the AAM-5.

== Design ==
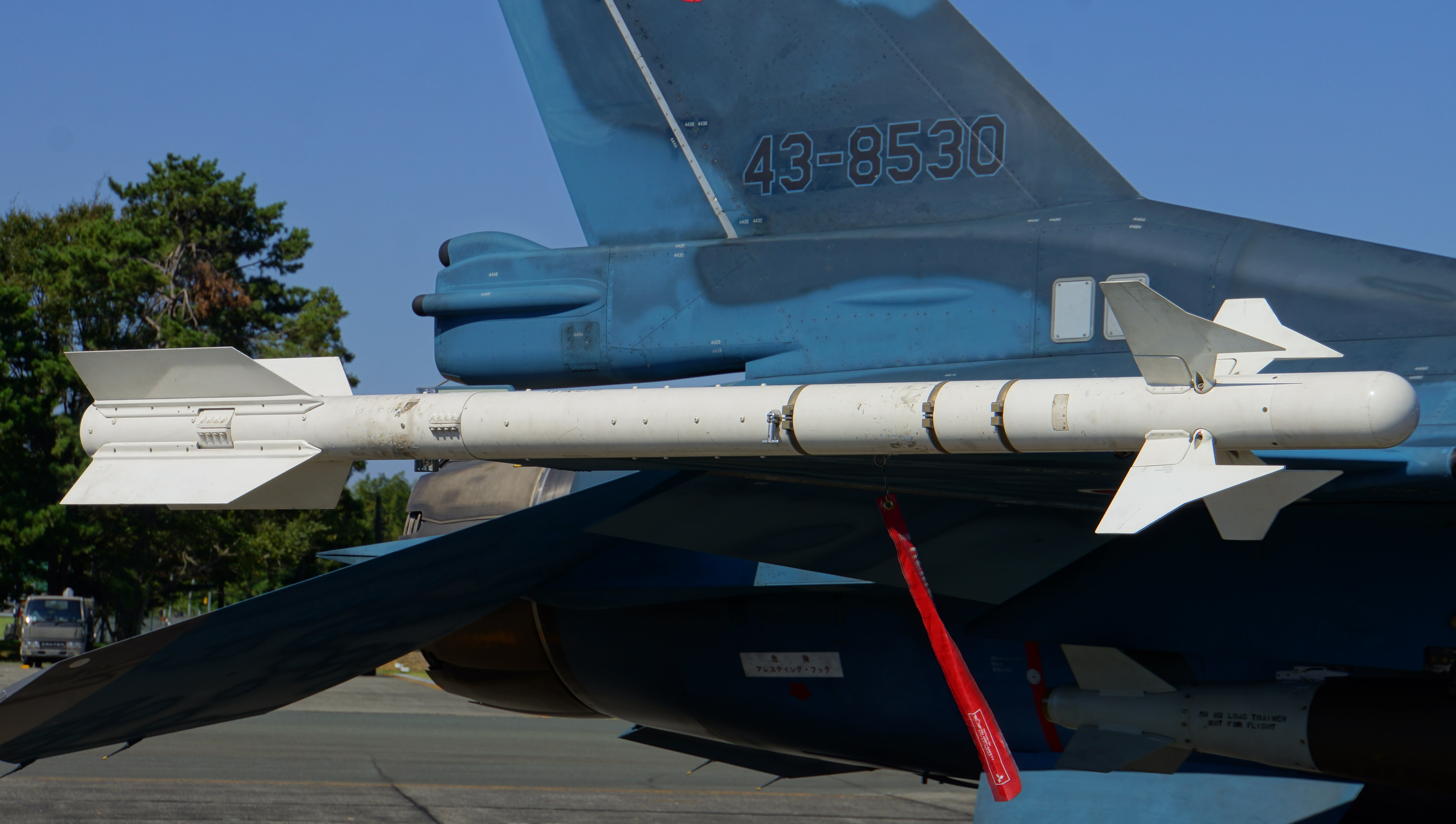
An AAM-3 on a wing-tip hardpoint of a Mitsubishi F-2, Hamamatsu Air Base. 2014

The AAM-3 uses a unique passive dual-wavelength light wave (infrared and ultraviolet) homing seeker. The front section is equipped with a large notched canard that improves the missile's manoeuvrability, and has a stabilizing wing at the end. Developed by NEC, the seeker is very resistant to aircraft-deployed countermeasures due to its Noise Removal technology. In addition, the swing angle of the seeker is large, so the dome at the tip of the missile is larger than that of the AIM-9 Sidewinder. The missile also has high off-boresight capability, and the missile is controlled using a direct-drive electric servo actuator that responds quickly and allows fine-grained control, unlike conventional gas servo systems that use hot gas. In addition, the bank-to-turn technology has been introduced, the seeker and swing angle have been expanded, and two-color infrared rays have been adopted, resulting in a high accuracy rate. The proximity fuse is also made by NEC and is an optical type using a laser. The warhead uses a directional warhead that can efficiently deliver large attack power. Its overall capabilities are said to exceed that of the American AIM-9L Sidewinder, which the missile was developed from.

== Operators ==
Japan

- Japan Air Self-Defense Force
  - F-15J/DJ Eagle
  - Mitsubishi F-2
  - F-4EJ Kai

== Specifications ==
- Length: 3.1 m
- Diameter: 127 mm
- Weight: 91 kg
- Guidance: Infrared Homing / Ultraviolet Homing (EO-UV/IR)
- Range: 7-13 km
- Speed: Mach 3.5

Source: https://www.forecastinternational.com/samples/F659_CompleteSample.pdf

== See also ==
- AAM-1 – (Japan)
- AAM-2 – (Japan)
- AAM-4 – (Japan)
- AAM-5 – (Japan) - replacement missile
- AIM-9 – (United States) - developed from
- Dornier Viper – (West Germany, Norway) - cancelled missile developed around the same time period
- PL-9 – (China)
