= AAM-4 =

Air-to-air missile

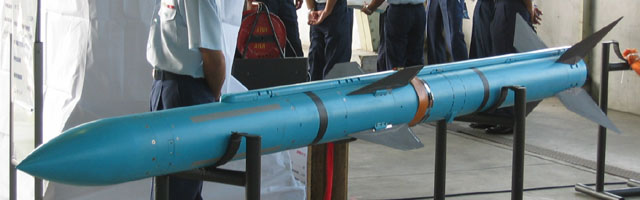
- Type: Beyond-visual-range air-to-air missile/surface-to-air missile
- Place of origin: Japan

Service history
- In service: September 1999–present
- Used by: See Operators

Production history
- Manufacturer: 1999–present – Mitsubishi Heavy Industries
- Unit cost: US$450,000
- Variants: AAM-4, XRIM-4, AAM-4B, AAM-4TDR

Specifications
- Mass: 489 lb (222 kg)
- Length: 12 ft (3,667 mm)
- Diameter: 8 in (203 mm)
- Wingspan: 30 in (770 mm)
- Warhead: High explosive Directional blast-fragmentation
- Warhead weight: 69 lb (31.3 kg)
- Detonation mechanism: 4-Quadrant Radar Proximity fuse, impact fuse
- Blast yield: 16.2kg TNT Equivalent
- Engine: Two-stage Solid-fuel rocket motor
- Operational range: AAM-4: 46 nmi (85 km); AAM-4B: 65 nmi (120 km); AAM-4TDR: 92 nmi (170 km)
- Maximum speed: Mach 4.5 (5,063 ft/s; 1,544 m/s)
- Guidance system: Fuzzy guidance logic Mid-Course: Inertial guidance, datalink, SARH Terminal: Active radar homing, inertial guidance, datalink
- Steering system: AAM-4/4B: 25G maximum overload
- Launch platform: F-15J, F-2
- References: Japanese Ministry of Defense, MHI

The Mitsubishi AAM-4 (Type 99 air-to-air missile, 99式空対空誘導弾 (99 Shiki Kūtaikū Yūdōdan)) is a medium-range active radar homing air-to-air missile. It is a modern beyond-visual-range missile developed in Japan and intended to replace the semi-active radar homing AIM-7 Sparrow missile in service. It has been operational since 1999. The main contractor is Mitsubishi Electric. The AAM-4 had a development cost of 36.2 billion yen. The 2010 AAM-4B was the world's first air-to-air missile with an AESA radar seeker, though the missile's fins are too large to fit in the internal weapons bay of the F-35 Lightning II.

In addition to its air-to-air capabilities, the missile can intercept cruise missiles and other ASMs. However it can only engage them from the front aspect, lacking sufficient energy to hit them from side or rear aspects.

== Development ==
Technical research into a future medium-range AAM started in Japan in 1985, however it was not until 1994 that the design for the AAM-4 itself started, with early live testing of the XAAM-4 being done as early as late 1996 from a modified F-4EJ Kai. It initially saw service on the Mitsubishi F-15J, on post J-MSIP models, or else models which had undergone IRAN (Inspection and Repair As Necessary) periodic maintenance. It was not on the Mitsubishi F-2 initially due to it lacking a place for the J/ARG-1 radio transceiver, however it was later added when the radar was upgraded to the J/APG-2, which included the necessary components.

The AAM-4 uses a fuzzy guidance logic control system, as opposed to PID or binary logic. With over 70 values being taken into account to calculate its control logic. This allows for superior energy retention over other guidance logics. Additionally it greatly improves ECCM, by allowing for soft comparisons of datalink, inertial, active, and semi-active targeting information, cross referencing error rates from detected interference and target velocity information to estimate the most accurate information to guide itself. It uses a directional blast fragmentation warhead, with roughly 16.2 kg TNT equivalent of explosive surrounded by 600 fragmentation segments, each with up to 7.7mm of steel penetration. It is detonated with a variable detonation system, using either a 4-quadrant radar proximity fuse, or an impact fuse, to direct the blast in the direction of the detected target. The proximity fuse additionally uses frequency modulation to resist electronic countermeasures. This fuse has a 4-6s arming period after being fired.

The datalink for the missile is provided by the J/ARG-1 radio transceiver, an X-Ku band radio transceiver which uses frequency modulation to reduce its detectability by hostiles, as well as to resist interference from electronic countermeasures. The missile can be fired without this transceiver, however when doing so greatly decreases its effectiveness.

The seeker of the AAM-4 is, like its proximity fuse and datalink system, operated using frequency modulation to minimize its ability to be detected by hostile Radar warning receivers. Unlike the AIM-120 AMRAAM, which uses a Traveling-wave tube transmitter, the AAM-4 uses a small, high-output, and inexpensive gallium arsenide semiconductor FET improving lock-on performance, ECCM and anti-clutter performance.

The improved AAM-4B was the world's first air-to-air missile with an AESA radar seeker. The AAM-4B entered production in 2010 for service on the F-15J and F-2. It has a range of 1.2x that of the regular AAM-4, thanks to improved guidance logic, as well as a 1.4x increase in autonomous detection range. Using GaN semi-conductors, it operates in the K_{a} band, and is capable of SAR imaging. The Type 12 surface-to-ship missile and ASM-3 use the same seeker, using its imaging capabilities to allow for the detection of stealth ships, being successfully capable of spotting a Mogami-class frigate.

== Future ==
On 17 July 2014, Japan announced a collaboration with the United Kingdom to study the development of a new Joint New Air-to-Air Missile (JNAAM). MBDA UK is prime contractor on the Meteor missile which entered service on the Saab JAS 39 Gripen in 2016 and on the Eurofighter Typhoon and Dassault Rafale in 2018, and can fit in the internal weapons bay of the F-35. It has a unique variable-flow ramjet motor that according to MBDA gives the Meteor the largest no-escape zone of any air-to-air missile. The JNAAM will "[combine] the UK's missile-related technologies and Japanese seeker technologies", possibly with some adjustments to help the missile fit better in the F-35 weapons bay.

The JNAAM was reportedly discontinued due to performance limitations; assessments projected a maximum speed around Mach 3.5, which compared unfavorably to the Meteor's estimated capability exceeding Mach 4.

== Variants ==
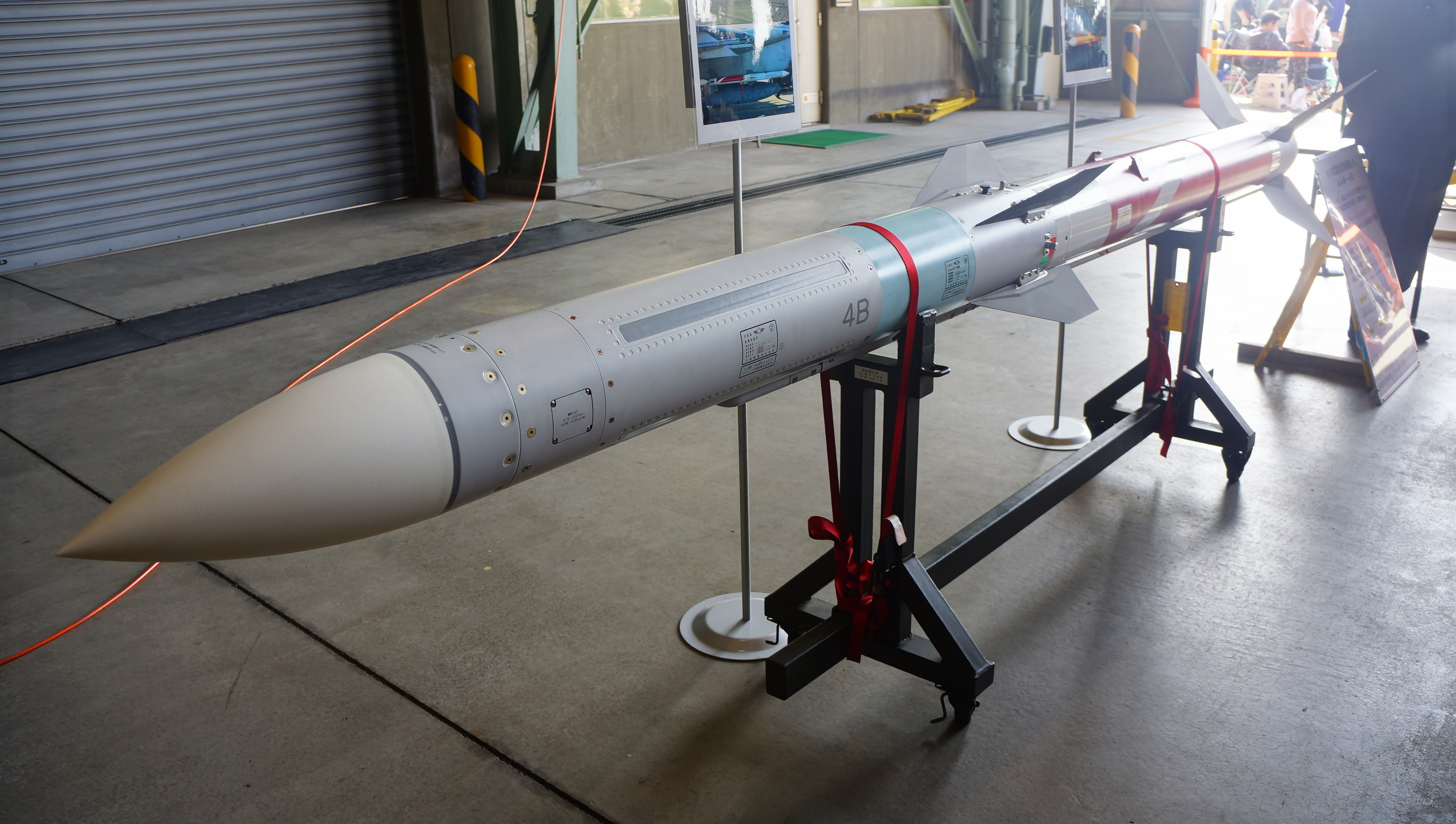
AAM-4B prototype

- AAM-4 – Original version with 85 km (53 mi) range that entered service in 1999.
- AAM-4B – Improved version introduced in 2010 with a K_{a} band millimetric frequency AESA seeker and 105 km (65 mi) range. also utilized on the Type 12 surface-to-ship missile, As well as on the ASM-3.
- XRIM-4 – Naval surface-launched variant, project was previously canceled but effectively resurrected in 2016.
- AAM-4TDR – Throttleable Ducted Rocket (TDR) Test model, based on the XRIM-4, had Thrust vectoring and BTT (Bank to turn) capabilities. Range estimated to be around 1.6-2x that of the AAM-4.

== Operators ==
Japan

Japan Air Self-Defense Force

- F-15J Eagle
- Mitsubishi F-2

== Specifications ==
- Length: 3,667 mm
- Diameter: 203 mm
- Wing span: 770 mm
- Weight: 222 kg (489 lb)
- Guidance: inertial guidance, datalink, semi-active radar homing, active radar homing
- Range: 70 km (AAM-4), 120 km (AAM-4B)
- Speed: Mach 4.5

== See also ==
- AAM-1 – (Japan)
- AAM-2 – (Japan)
- AAM-3 – (Japan)
- AAM-5 – (Japan) – short range heatseeking missile introduced 2004
- AIM-120 AMRAAM – (United States)
- Sky Sword II – (Taiwan)
- Meteor (missile) – (France, United Kingdom, Italy, Germany, Spain, Sweden)
- PL-12 – (China)
- PL-15 – (China)
- R-77 – (Russia)
