= A-Darter =

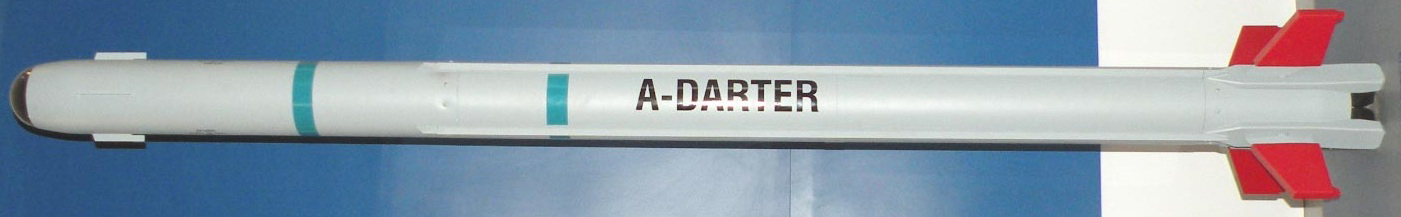
- A-Darter missile
- Type: Short range air-to-air missile
- Place of origin: South Africa & Brazil

Production history
- Manufacturer: Denel Dynamics; SIATT
- Produced: since 2015

Specifications
- Mass: 89 kilograms (196 lb)
- Length: 2.98 metres (117 in)
- Diameter: 0.166 metres (6.5 in)
- Wingspan: 0.488 metres (19.2 in)
- Detonation mechanism: laser proximity fuse
- Engine: Solid fuel rocket
- Operational range: 10 kilometres (6.2 mi)
- Guidance system: dual-colour Infrared homing
- Launch platform: Combat aircraft

The V3E A-Darter (Agile Darter) is a modern short-range infrared homing ("heat seeking") air-to-air missile, featuring countermeasures resistance with a 180-degree look angle and 120-degrees per second track rate, developed by South Africa's Denel Dynamics (formerly Kentron) and Brazil's Mectron (now SIATT), Avibras and Opto Eletrônica (acquired by AKAER). It will equip the South African Air Force's Saab JAS 39 Gripen C/D and BAE Hawk 120, and the Brazilian Air Force's A-1M AMX, Northrop F-5BR and Gripen E/F. It was expected to be in production before the end of 2015. As of November 2022, no combat capable missiles had been produced.

== Development ==
Development of the A-Darter began in 1995, but the program suffered from inadequate funding and changes to the SAAF's requirements. Mectron, Avibras and Atech joined the program in 2006 after a three-year negotiation process with US$52 million invested by the Brazilian Government in the project, estimated to be worth US$130 million. In that same year, Denel announced that it would use the latest solid-state inertial measurement unit, the SiIMU02 from BAE Systems, for mid-course range guidance. The Brazilian company Opto Eletrônica has partnered with Denel Dynamics in the development of the missile imaging infrared seeker for thermal guidance.

Ground seeker tests were concluded in January 2010, while trajectory guidance and agility flight tests were performed in February 2010. Prototypes were sent to Saab AB to begin the integration of the missile to the Saab JAS 39 Gripen. Captive flight trials were concluded in March 2010. The first successful in-flight launch from a Gripen fighter took place on 17 June 2010.

In March 2012, Denel Dynamics disclosed that the missile, which was to be ready for production by end of 2013, entered the qualification phase. Several testing firings at Denel's Overberg Test Range were carried out from a Gripen in January 2012. Final testing included the use of high-speed target drones to simulate an aircraft by towing infrared targets at high speed.

In December 2012, the Brazilian air force commissioned Denel to build a factory in São José dos Campos, close to Mectron, Avibras and Opto Eletrônica.

In February 2015, Denel Dynamics signed an agreement with Marotta Controls for supply of the latter's MPACT pure air compression technology to cool the A-Darter's infrared seeker.

== Production ==
In March 2015 SAAF ordered 41 operational missiles, 21 trainer variants and 8 practice variants from Denel Dynamics. At this time deliveries were to be completed by October 2017.

Production of the missiles has been delayed. Testing was finalised in November 2019. Due to liquidity problems affecting Denel and the resignation of key personnel, no combat capable missiles had been produced as of November 2022.

As of October 2024 Denel has begun delivering practice missiles to the South African Air Force, with operational missiles to be delivered in March or April of 2025.

== Design ==
The missile seeker can be slaved to the Helmet Mounted Display (HMD), allowing the pilot to track a target beyond the aircraft's radar scan envelope using the missile's high off-boresight capability, achieved by the pilot turning his head towards the target to lock-on, better known as "look and shoot". The missile can then be launched and can immediately pull extreme g-force to reverse its course to engage a target behind the aircraft, sometimes called an "over-the-shoulder". Engage modes include Lock-On After Launch (LOAL) capability to engage targets outside its seeker's acquisition range, and Lock-On Before Launch (LOBL) capability where the target is identified and designated before launch. The two colour thermal imaging technology and a laser proximity fuse fitted on the missile provide multiple Electronic counter-countermeasures (ECCM) techniques with targeting algorithms including advanced spatial filtering techniques and velocity profiling.

The A-Darter has four major sections: guidance section, warhead, control, and rocket motor. It uses a streamlined design with low aerodynamic drag in a wingless airframe, ensuring ranges beyond those of traditional short-range missiles. It is fitted with a thrust vectoring control (TVC) system that allows for turning at up to 100g and for a period of 8 seconds while the motor burns, after which the missile can still retain 50g of manoverability.

The absence of aluminium powder in the motor propellent inhibits production of a smoke trail, which means no visual warning for enemy aircraft. According to SAAF fighter pilots involved within the project, the A-Darter is better than the IRIS-T in some respects.

== See also ==
Similar missiles

- AIM-9X – (United States)
- ASRAAM – (United Kingdom)
- IRIS-T – (Germany, Italy, Sweden, Greece)
- Python 5 – (Israel)
- Vympel R-73 – (Soviet Union)
- AAM-5 (Japanese missile) – (Japan)
- PL-10 – (China)
