= AAM-1 (Japanese missile) =

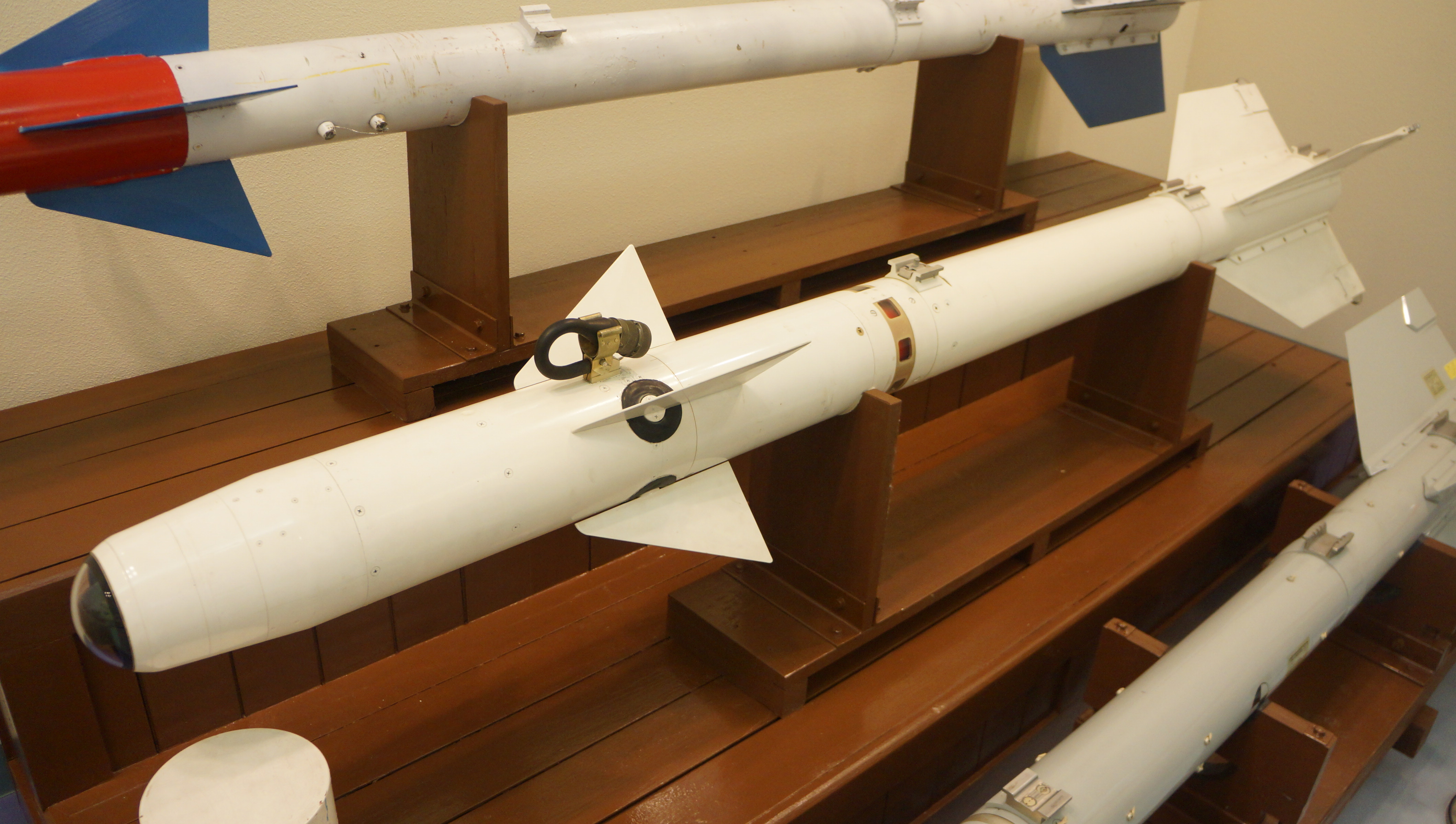
- AAM-1 model
- Type: Short-range, infrared homing air-to-air missile
- Place of origin: Japan

Service history
- In service: 1969-1986
- Used by: Japan

Production history
- Manufacturer: Mitsubishi Heavy Industries
- Unit cost: • ¥3,000,000 (1968) • ¥4,190,000 (1969)
- Produced: 1969
- No. built: around 400

Specifications
- Mass: 80 kg (180 lb)
- Length: 2.5 m (8 ft 2 in)
- Diameter: 15 cm (6 in)
- Operational range: 5 km (3 mi)
- Maximum speed: 1.7 Mach
- Guidance system: infrared homing
- Launch platform: Aircraft: F-104J Starfighter; North American F-86F; Mitsubishi F-1

The Mitsubishi AAM-1 was a Japanese infrared homing air-to-air missile developed from the AIM-9B Sidewinder missile.

== Operational history ==
Starting in 1969, the AAM-1 was produced by Mitsubishi Heavy Industries, with around 400 produced in total. It served as the standard armament for Japan Air Self-Defense Force F-104J while used on North American F-86F and Mitsubishi F-1. Being slightly shorter and lighter compared to the AIM-9E Sidewinder, the AAM-1 had inferior performances compared to the American missile which was entering service in Japan. The unit cost of an AIM-9B purchased through Foreign Military Sales was about 1 million yen, while that of AAM-1 was about 3.5 million yen in 1968 and about 4.19 million yen in 1969. Due to higher cost and inferior characteristics, the procurement of the AAM-1 was halted in 1972 with the last examples withdrawn for service in 1986.

== Operators ==
- Japan - Japan Air Self-Defense Force

== See also ==
- AAM-2 – (Japan)
- AAM-3 – (Japan)
- AAM-4 – (Japan)
- AAM-5 – (Japan)
- AIM-9 Sidewinder – (United States)
- K-13 – (Soviet Union)
- R-60 – (Soviet Union)
- R.550 Magic – (France)
- Shafrir-1 – (Israel)
