= AAM-5 (missile) =

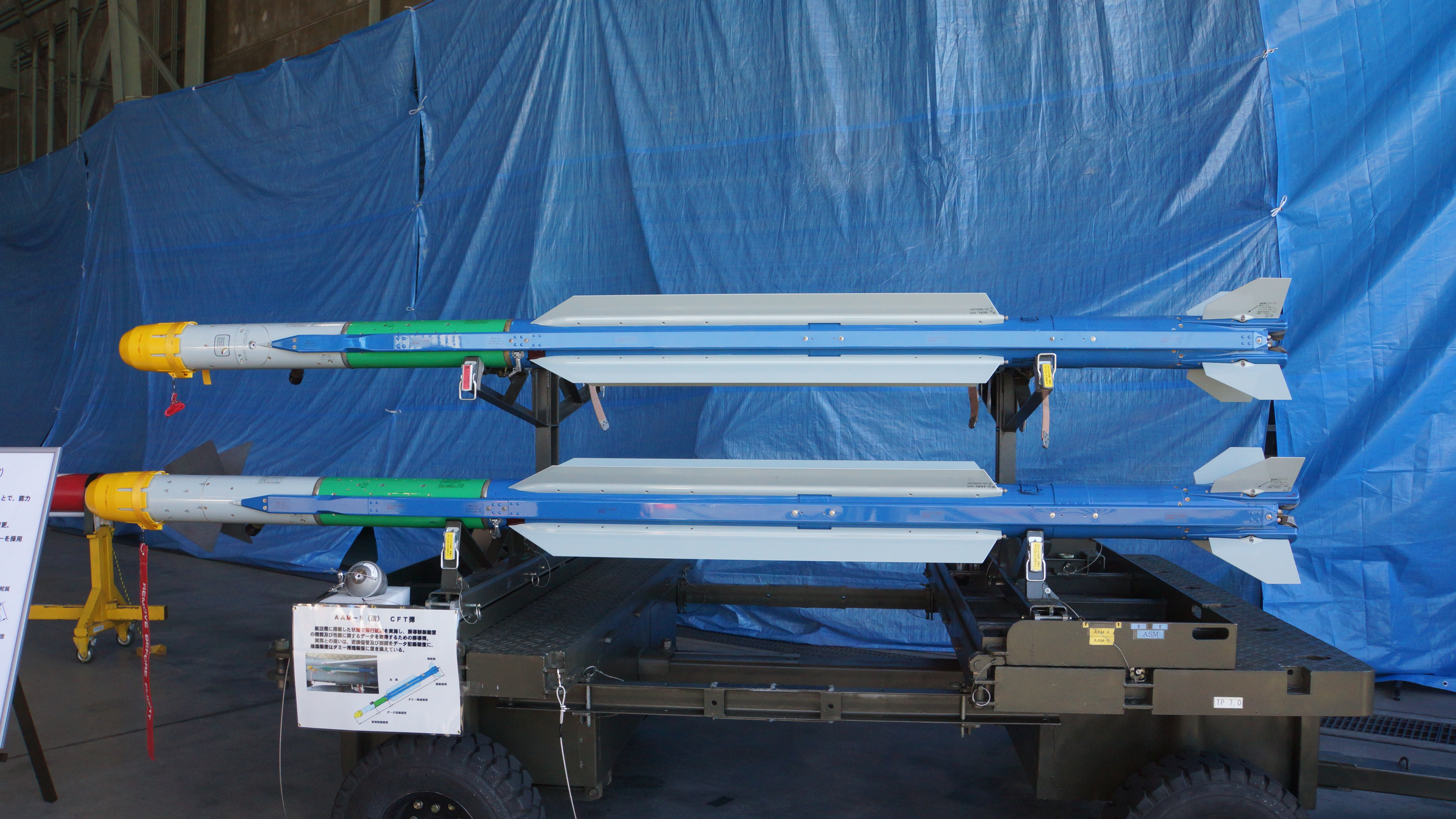
- AAM-5 and AAM-5B
- Type: Short-range air-to-air missile
- Place of origin: Japan

Service history
- In service: 2004–present
- Used by: Japan Air Self-Defense Force

Production history
- Manufacturer: Mitsubishi Heavy Industries
- Unit cost: 55–60 million yen

Specifications
- Mass: 95 kg (209 lb)
- Length: 3.105 m (10.19 ft)
- Diameter: 130 mm (5.1 in)
- Wingspan: 440 mm (17 in)
- Warhead: blast-frag
- Detonation mechanism: laser proximity fuze and impact
- Propellant: solid fuel rocket
- Operational range: 35 km (22 mi)
- Maximum speed: Mach 3
- Guidance system: Infrared homing AAM-5: (IIR + INS) AAM-5B: ((Dual Wavelength) IIR + INS)

The Mitsubishi AAM-5 (Type 04 air-to-air missile, 04式空対空誘導弾) is a short-range air-to-air missile developed and produced by Mitsubishi Heavy Industries for the Japan Air Self-Defense Force. Development of the missile as a replacement for the AAM-3 (Type 90) missile commenced in 1991, and it has been operational since 2004.

== Characteristics ==
Unlike the Type 90 guided missile, the AAM-5 does not have canard control surfaces, using thrust vectoring for high agility. The missile body has narrow strakes extending over most of its length. It features inertial guidance, provided by a fiber-optic gyroscope, which allows for LOAL (Lock-on after launch). Additionally it allows for high off-boresight use, through cueing targets outside of the seeker's field of view via a HMD. Terminal homing is via infrared imaging (IIR). In terms of generation, it is placed in the same generation as missiles such as the AIM-9X and IRIS-T.

For the AAM-5B, the NEC manufactured seeker has also been improved, with a dual wavelength infra-red focal plane array seeker. Additionally the gimbal type was changed from a 2-axis to a 3-axis design, allowing for improved off-boresight capabilities, as well as improved IRCCM. The reason the additional gimbal improves IRCCM functionality is due to the missile's IRCCM method, an image recognition type which relies on comparing the frame to prior ones to look for the target which it was originally locked onto.

== Variants ==
- AAM-5

The original variant introduced in 2004, has limited operational time due to its seeker cooling type.

- AAM-5B

Enhanced background discrimination capability and IRCCM by changing to a dual wavelength seeker and a 3-axis gimbal. Seeker cooling time is extended by the adoption of a Stirling engine, up to a maximum cooling time of 1 hours.

== Operators ==
Japan

Japan Air Self-Defense Force

- F-15J Eagle
- Mitsubishi F-2

== Gallery ==
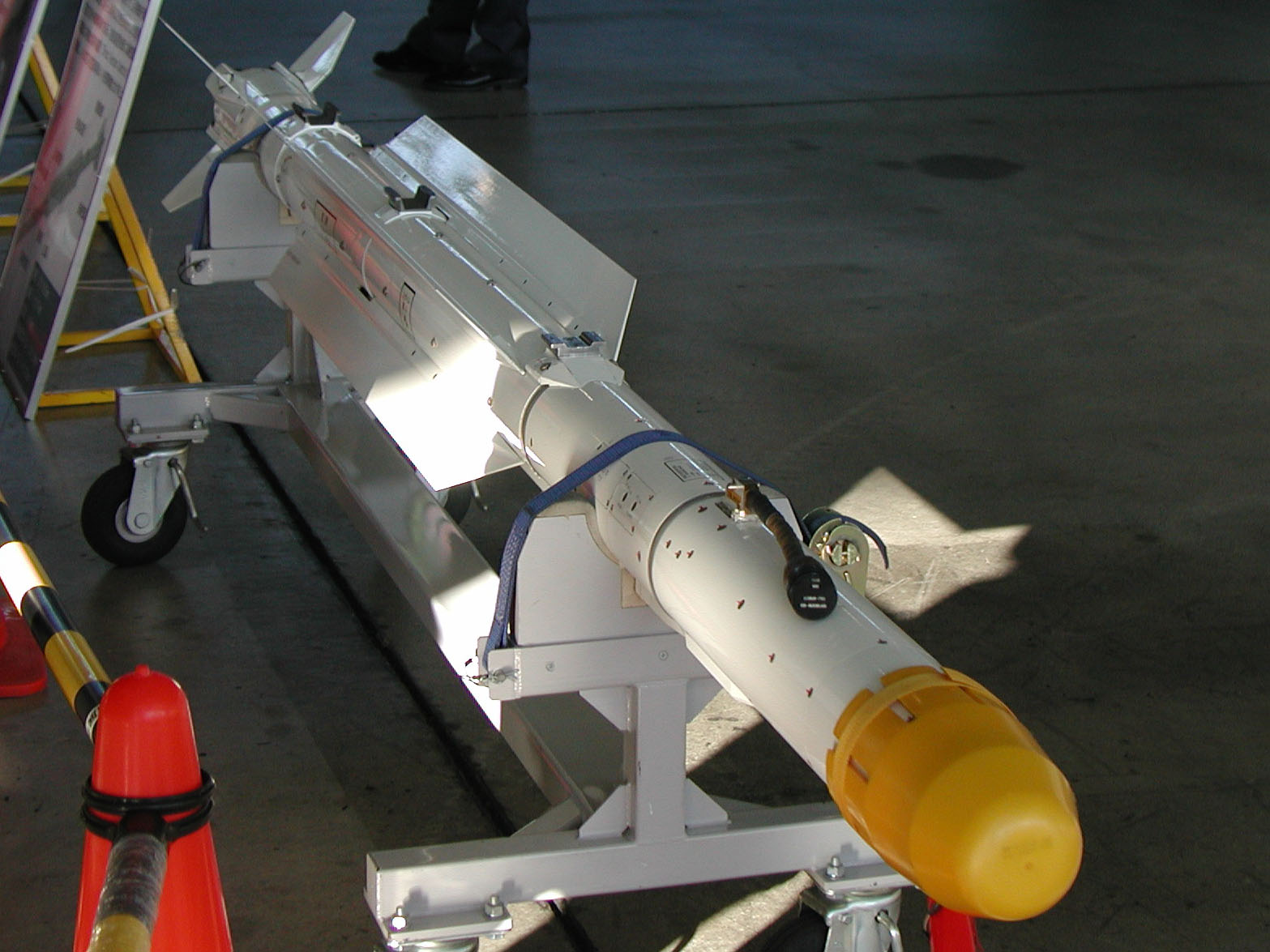
Dummy

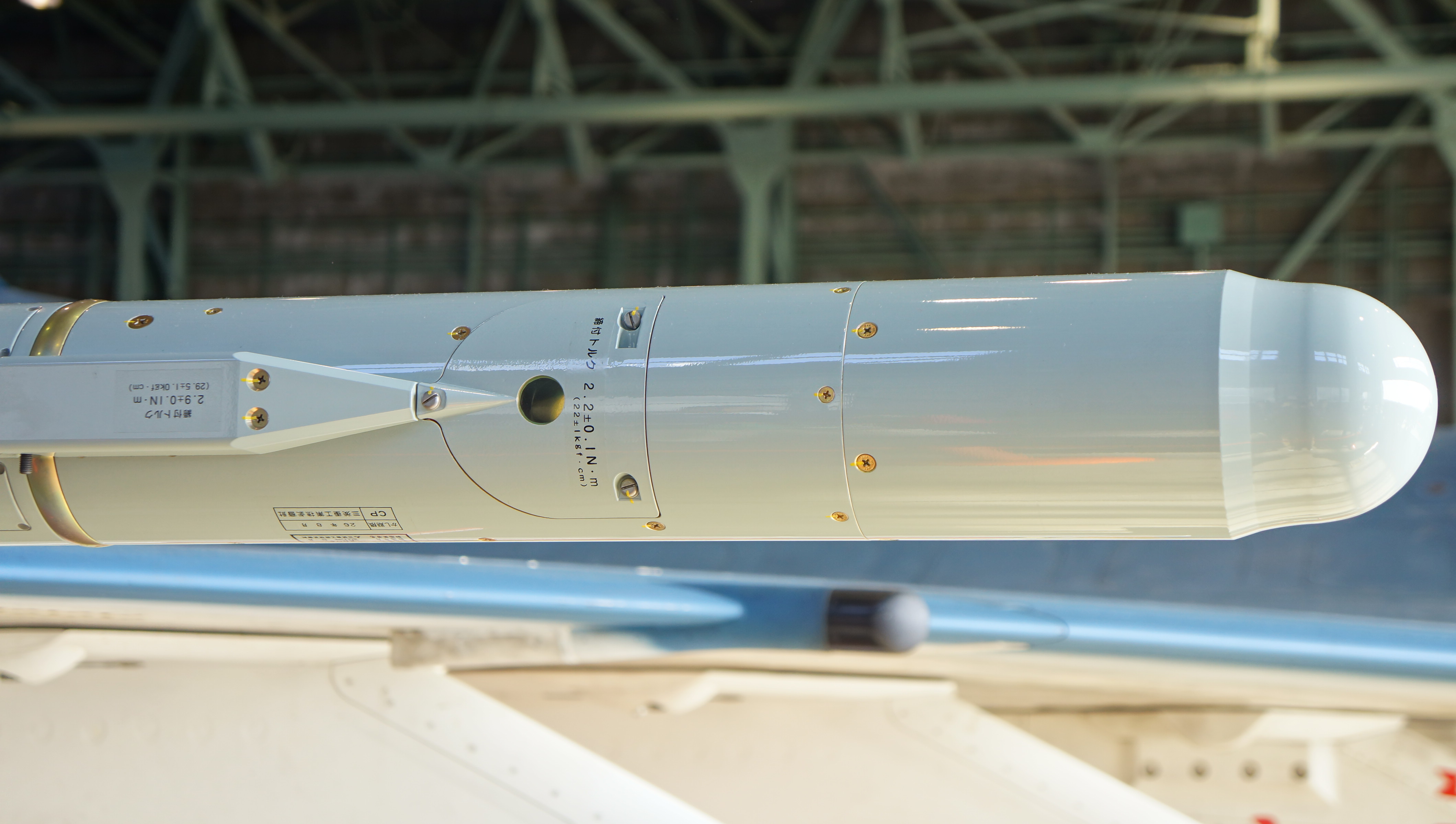
Seeker

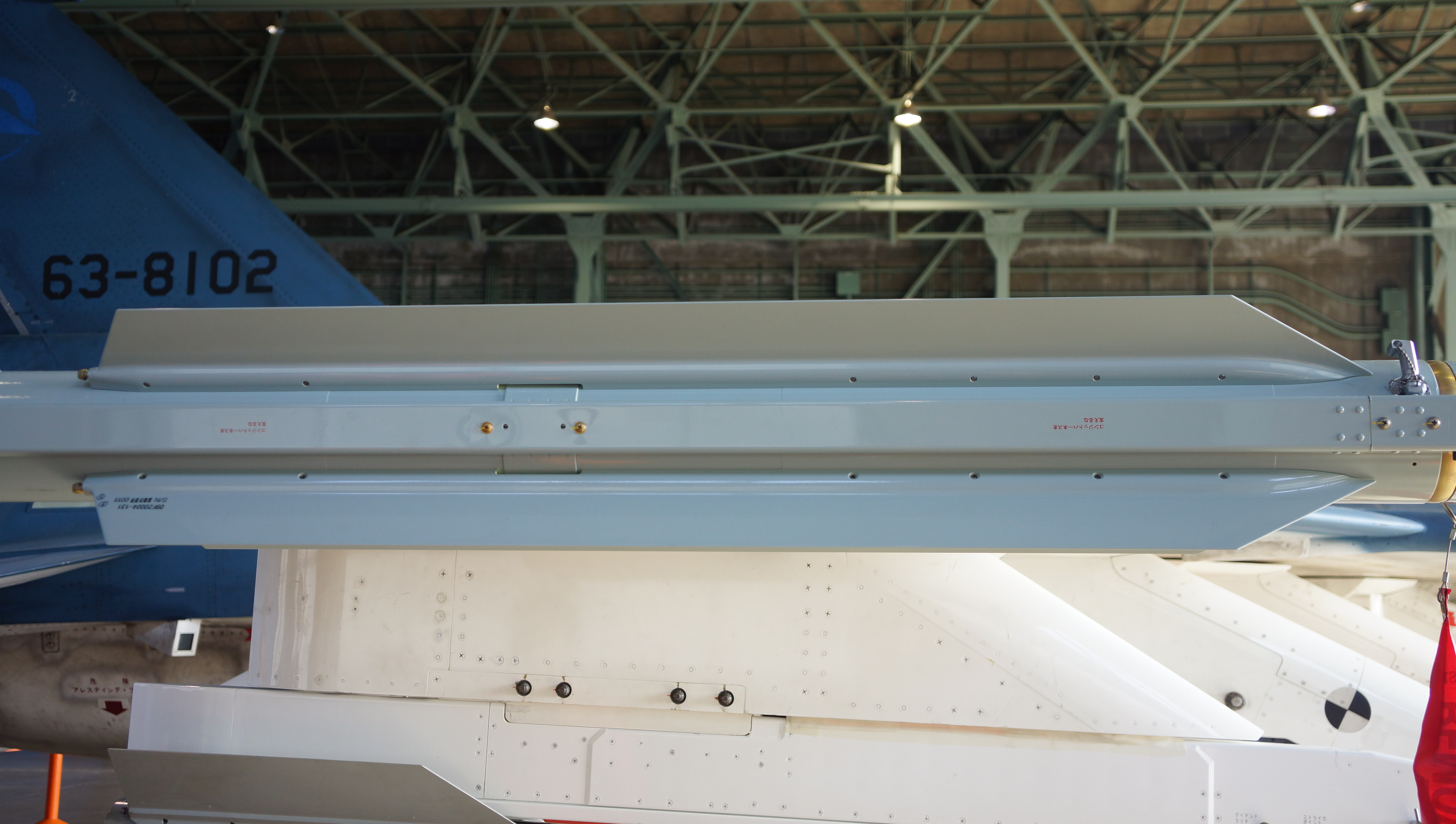
Leading-edge extension

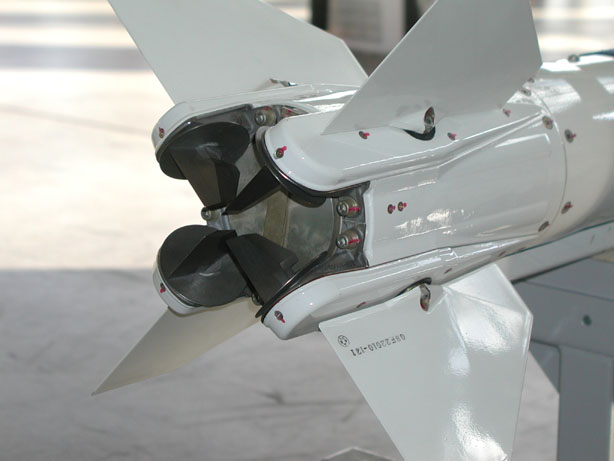
Thrust vectoring Nozzle

== Specifications ==
- Length: 3,105 mm
- Diameter: 130 mm
- Wing span: 440 mm
- Weight: 95 kg
- Guidance: AAM-5A: Terminal IIR, INS)
- Guidance: AAM-5B: Terminal IIR, INS)
- Warhead: blast fragmentation warhead
- Detonation Mechanism: laser proximity fuze and impact
- Range: 35 km
- Speed: Mach 3+

== See also ==
- IRIS-T – (Germany, Italy, Sweden, Greece) - Similar missile
- AAM-1 – (Japan)
- AAM-2 – (Japan)
- AAM-3 – (Japan)
- AAM-4 – (Japan)
- PL-10 – (China)
