= Dornier Viper =

Air-to-air missile project

The Dornier Viper was a West German/Norwegian air-to-air missile project, intended to replace the AIM-9 Sidewinder, in Luftwaffe service from 1975/76.

The Viper was developed by Bodenseewerk and Dornier Systems, using an infrared seeker and a new solid-fuel rocket motor (by Kongsberg Vapenfabrik), intended to have twice the burn time of the Sidewinder.

In 1974, the Viper was abandoned in favor of evaluating an American missile.

- Length: 2.7 m (8 ft 10 in)
- Diameter: 15 cm (5.9 in)
- Weight: 80 kg (180 lb)
