= AAM-2 =

Japanese prototype air-to-air missile

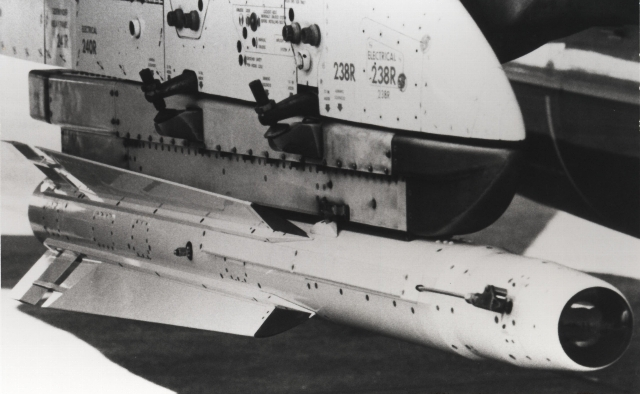
- AAM-2 Prototype
- Type: Short-range, infrared homing air-to-air missile
- Place of origin: Japan

Service history
- Used by: Japan

Production history
- Manufacturer: Mitsubishi Heavy Industries

Specifications
- Guidance system: infrared homing
- Launch platform: Aircraft: F-4EJ Phantom II

The Mitsubishi AAM-2 was a Japanese prototype for a limited all aspect infrared homing air-to-air missile developed based on the American AIM-4D Falcon missile. It never reached production.

== Development ==
In 1968, Japan selected a modified version of the F-4E as the next main future fighter of the Japan Air Self-Defense Force with the possibility to employ the AIM-4D being an important factor of the decision. The development of the XAAM-2 was started in 1970 as an air-to-air missile for the newly acquired F-4EJ. It was developed by the Technical Research and Development Institute and Mitsubishi Heavy Industries, aiming to exceed the performance of the original AIM-4D. The guidance system used infrared homing like the AIM-4D, but improved to a limited all-aspect infrared homing with the ability to attack from the front and side of the enemy aircraft with the reliability of electronic devices also improved. The missile employed a higher performance rocket motor expanding its range. In addition, the warhead power was increased compared to the AIM-4D, and it was equipped with a proximity fuze, solving major issues of the AIM-4D, such as the small warhead and the lack of a proximity fuze. Therefore, although the AAM-2 is very similar in appearance to the model AIM-4, it employed a different motor, warhead and guidance system. While being successfully tested, the AAM-2 never entered production due to higher cost compared to the American-made AIM-4D, with a high surplus stock after the Vietnam War. Japan rather imported the AIM-4D to equip its F-4EJ aircraft. The development of XAAM-2 was discontinued in 1975.

== See also ==
- AAM-1 – (Japan)
- AAM-3 – (Japan)
- AAM-5 – (Japan)
- AIM-9L Sidewinder – (United States)
- K-13 – (Soviet Union)
- R-60 – (Soviet Union)
- R.550 Magic – (France)
- Shafrir-1 – (Israel)
