= ACEVAL/AIMVAL =

The Air Combat Evaluation (ACEVAL) and the Air Intercept Missile Evaluation (AIMVAL) were two back-to-back Joint Test & Evaluations chartered by the United States Department of Defense that ran from 1974-78 at Nellis Air Force Base in Nevada. Both the U.S. Air Force and U.S. Navy participated, contributing a team of F-15 Eagle and F-14 Tomcat fighter aircraft and using the local F-5E Aggressor aircraft as the Red Force. The fundamental question that needed to be answered was one of "quantity vs quality". Mock engagements showed that cheaper, lower-technology fighters armed with all-aspect missiles were able to destroy the more advanced, expensive F-15s and F-14s. These results of the AIMVAL/ACEVAL testing led to the Air Force decision to structure its fighter forces with a balance of cheaper F-16s along with the more expensive F-15s, and the Navy took a similar strategy in procuring cheaper F/A-18s along with the more expensive F-14s. The results had other impacts as well, such as decisions regarding missile development.

== Purpose and Findings ==
ACEVAL looked at the effectiveness of the tactics utilized by high-performance U. S. aircraft against simpler, threat-type aircraft equipped with all-aspect missiles. The conclusion was that a cheaper fighter such as an F-5 could engage the more expensive jets like F-14 or F-15 that carried big radar and SARH missiles such as the AIM-7 Sparrow. The high-tech jets could easily fire a Sparrow against the F-5 but, because of the requirement to maintain the lock from launch till impact, the cheaper fighter could fire an all-aspect heat-seeker missile before it was shot down by the Sparrow. And because the heat seeker was fire-and-forget, in reality the expensive, high-tech jet was taken out by a much cheaper F-5. However, this situation occurred because the F-14s and F-15s larger and longer range radars could not be used to their full advantage due to the engagement rule that a pilot must visually identify its target before firing a missile. ACEVAL as such set the requirement for an true active homing, fire-and-forget missile, which became the AIM-120 AMRAAM series.

AIMVAL examined five missile concepts under consideration as replacements for the AIM-9L Sidewinder. AIMVAL findings were that the new missiles were no better than the AIM-9L, resulting in termination of the Navy AIM-95 Agile off-boresight/thrust vectoring air-to-air missile program, which was under development at the time. Actual seeker hardware was utilized in AIMVAL.

== Implications ==
ACEVAL/AIMVAL resulted in development of AMRAAM, but did not recommend development of a high off-boresight short-range missile, opting instead for a European-led effort to develop ASRAAM. However, the Soviet Union did develop such a missile and fielded the Vympel R-73 by 1985, taking the lead in short-range missile technology and performance for the first time since the Sidewinder entered service. This caused a number of countries to develop short-range missile programs to counter it, such as Python-4 in Israel, ASRAAM in Britain, MBDA MICA in France, AIM-9X in the United States, and IRIS-T in Germany. It was claimed that the Soviet Union benefited more from ACEVAL/AIMVAL than did its Western counterparts.

Additionally, part of the evaluation was to determine if the technology of the day had progressed to such a point that situational awareness was no longer a factor in air-to-air combat. The natural expectation in the beyond-visual-range missile trials was that hardware advantages would drive engagement outcomes. Actual test results, however, proved otherwise. As in both historical combat experience and AIMVAL/ACEVAL, situational awareness proved to be "the single most important factor affecting engagement outcomes." For both sides, being aware of and avoiding adversaries' weapons envelopes while trying to maneuver adversaries into their own weapons envelopes proved as important and dominant as it had been in ACEVAL.
