= SRAAM =

Taildog/SRAAM
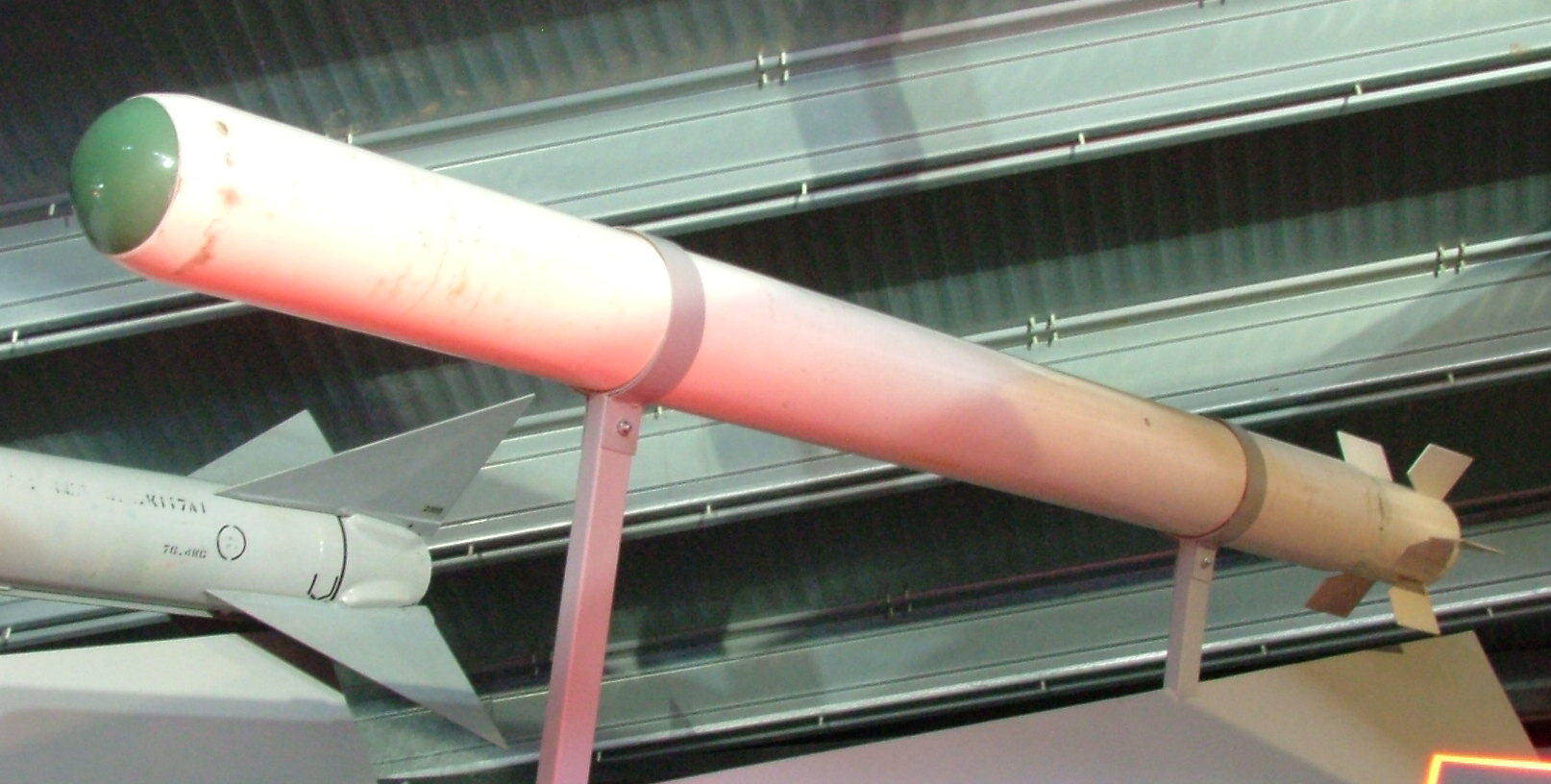
- SRAAM mockup at Royal Air Force Museum Cosford
- Type: Short-range air-to-air missile
- Place of origin: United Kingdom

Service history
- Used by: Experimental programme only

Production history
- Manufacturer: Hawker Siddeley

Specifications
- Mass: ca. 70 kg (150 lb)
- Length: 2.75 m (9 ft 0 in)
- Diameter: 165 mm (6.5 in)
- Wingspan: ca. 320 mm (13 in)
- Operational range: 250 m – 2 km
- Guidance system: Infra-red
- Steering system: thrust vectoring
- Launch platform: aircraft

The Short Range Air-to-Air Missile (Short-Range Anti-Air Missile in NATO AAP-15), or SRAAM for short, initially known as Taildog, was an experimental British infrared homing ("heat seeking") air-to-air missile, developed between 1968 and 1980 by Hawker Siddeley Dynamics. It was designed to be very manoeuvrable for use at short range in a dogfight situation. The SRAAM was unusual in that it was launched from a launch tube instead of being attached to a launch rail, allowing two to be carried on a single mounting point.

Although initially intended to replace the AIM-9 Sidewinder, it was downgraded to a technology demonstrator program in 1974. Between 1974 and 1977, several SRAAM missiles were launched in tests. In 1980, the knowledge gained from the SRAAM project was used in the ASRAAM missile project.

== History ==
=== Background ===
Early infrared homing missiles had two limitations that made them difficult to use in combat situations. The first was that the seeker was relatively insensitive and required large, hot sources to reliably track a target. In practice, this meant the engine of the enemy aircraft had to remain visible to the missile through the shot. The other was that the seeker had a limited field of view (FOV), meaning it could only see the target if it was in front of the missile. This meant it was possible for the target to escape by flying at right angles to the missile, maximizing its angular velocity relative to the seeker.

These limitations were made clear during the Vietnam War, when early missiles like the AIM-4 Falcon and AIM-9 Sidewinder had success rates on the order of 9% and 14%, respectively. Much of this was due to the fact that pilots had been trained to approach using radar or ground-controlled interception, which placed the enemy aircraft somewhere in front of them, but not necessarily flying in the same direction. In these situations, the seeker might see the target's engine and send the growling signal that indicated lock-on, but would fail to track when fired because the target would move out of the FOV in the time while the missile was flying off the mounting rail.

Faced with these dismal results, the US Navy and then US Air Force introduced new training syllabuses that placed much more emphasis on pre-shot maneuvering, so the launch aircraft would be both behind the target and flying in the same general direction. This would maximize the chance that the target would still be visible to the missile after it was launched. Unfortunately, such maneuvering was both time consuming and potentially difficult to arrange, and in combat there were many situations where a target would cross in front of the fighter in a "snap shot". To provide some capability in these situations, autocannons were hastily added to those fighters that lacked them.

=== Taildog ===
Considering this problem, designers at Hawker Siddeley Dynamics, Hawker's missile division, decided that it would be better to have a missile work like the pilots wanted rather than the pilots working the way the missile wanted. They began designing a missile that would track successfully in every situation where the missile indicated lock-on. In order for this to happen, it would have to have a very wide FOV, or "off-boresight capability", so it would continue to see the target even if it was crossing rapidly. It would also have to have extremely high manoeuvrability so it could successfully track down an aircraft in these situations.

The company began low-level development of such a weapon as a private venture under the name "Taildog" in 1968. This goal was a short-range, low-cost missile that would fill the gap between guns and then-current missiles like the Firestreak and the Red Top. Hawker described it as 'a gun that fires around corners'. The initial design was 2.0 m long, had a diameter of 16.5 cm and weighed 50 kg. It was capable of engaging targets between 250 m and 2 km, as compared to perhaps 12 km under the best case for the Red Top. The first photographs of mock-ups were shown in early 1970, and were displayed at a trade show in Hannover later that year.

The Taildog was highly manoeuvrable through the use of thrust vectoring for all flight control. Vectoring was accomplished by rotating small vanes into the rocket exhaust. Six of these vanes were arranged as segments of a circle at the tail end of the missile body, where they were protected from the rocket exhaust. Each segment was pivoted at one end, allowing it to be rotated so the other end would be moved into the exhaust. The control system would activate the segment closest to the required change in direction. External aerodynamic surfaces were reduced to vestigial surfaces near the rear of the missile, and were unmovable.

Hawker was not the only one to come up with this basic concept; around the same time, the US Navy and the Air Force both began similar programs for similar reasons, ultimately combining their efforts in the AIM-95 Agile project. The Taildog and the Agile differed primarily in range; the Taildog was intended as a short-range dogfighting weapon, while the Agile was a replacement for the Sidewinder and set range requirements at least as good as that missile, producing a much larger design.

=== SRAAM ===
In 1970 the British Ministry of Defence came to the conclusion that a better short-range missile was needed, and drew up a request for proposals, AST 1218. AST 1218 also included the requirement that the missile could be carried by aircraft that lacked the radar-aided target acquisition systems of the Phantom and Lightning.

The Taildog became Hawker Siddeley's response to AST 1218, which became ASR 1222 when the contract was awarded. Hawker's proposal was received favourably, and in 1972 the Ministry of Defence awarded a development contract (Air Staff Requirement 1222). Two versions were studied, the advanced SRAAM-100 and a basic version called SRAAM-75. Both used the same airframe but different electronic fits. The SRAAM was slightly longer than the Taildog, with a length of 2.75 m (9 ft 0 in). The diameter remained the same. The thrust director system was replaced with a moving dome deflector, which consists of a cone-shaped deflector placed in the exhaust which is moved to the sides to cause the thrust to change. The fins were moved to the rear and were reshaped.

The SRAAM was designed to be carried in a launch tube to protect the missile. The fins on the missile were hinged and designed to extend following launch. The launcher comprised two tubes and an optional radar cueing system, enabling the missile to be carried by almost any aircraft with little modification. The missile could be fired automatically when a target came into view of the seeker, unlike, for example, the Firestreak, which needed to be fed targeting information by the aircraft's radar.

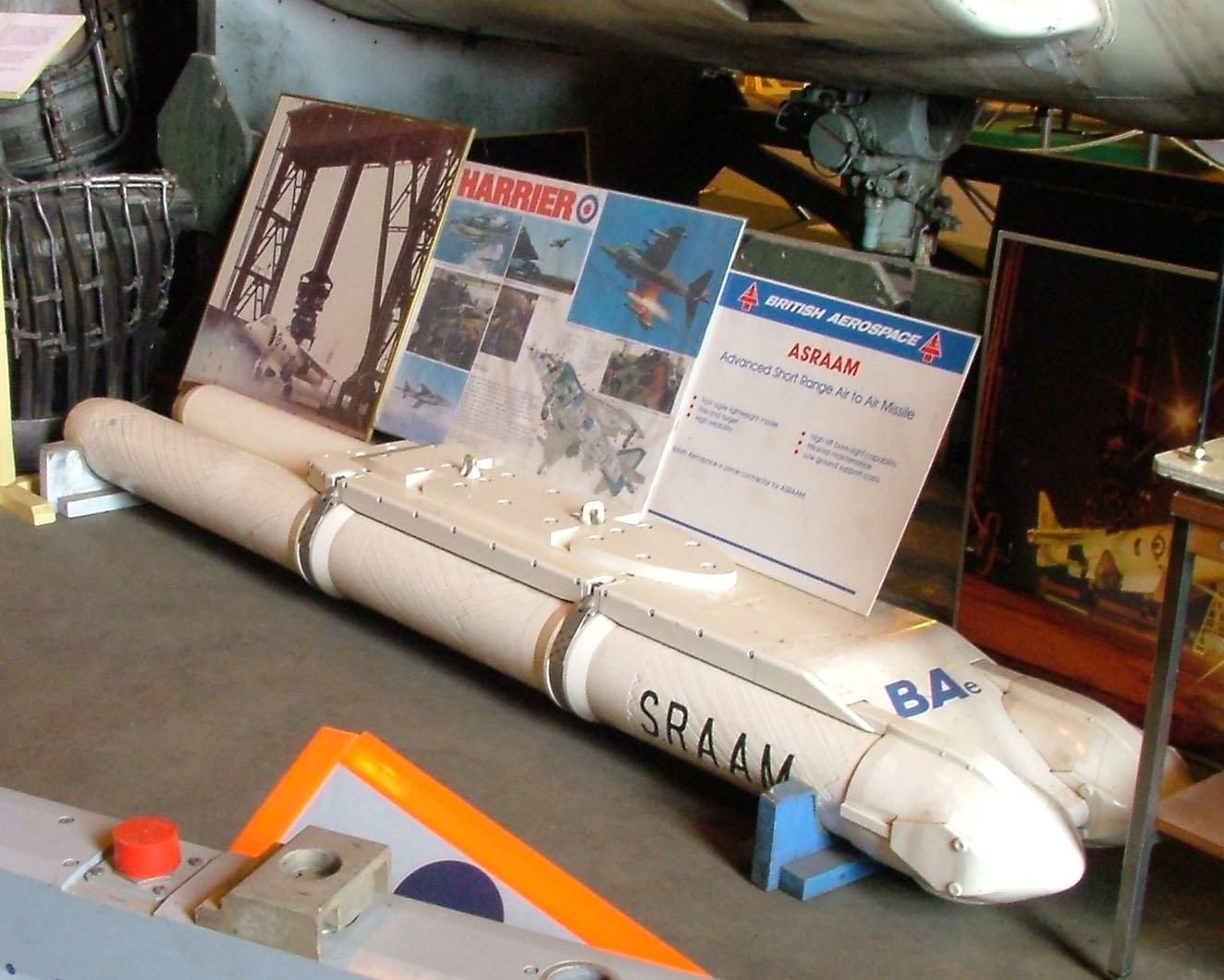
SRAAM launcher at Bristol Aero Collection

The contract was cancelled in 1974 due to defence cuts in favour of work on the Skyflash, but retained as a technology demonstration program. In 1977, eight test missiles were fired from the ground and from a Hawker Hunter F.6 (RAF serial XG210). The trials were successful, with one famous incident demonstrating the missile's manoeuvrability when it turned into the Hunter's flight path immediately after launch and almost collided with it. In the same year, the British MOD chose the AIM-9L Sidewinder as its next short-range missile, but the SRAAM project was kept alive to provide a base for a future missile design.

In 1980, the SRAAM work became the starting point for the ASRAAM.

Surviving artefacts include a mockup of the missile in the Royal Air Force Museum Cosford, and a launcher at the Bristol Aero Collection.

== See also ==
- AIM-82
- AIM-95
- List of missiles
