= Infrared homing =

Weapon guidance system utilizing the target's infrared emissions to track it

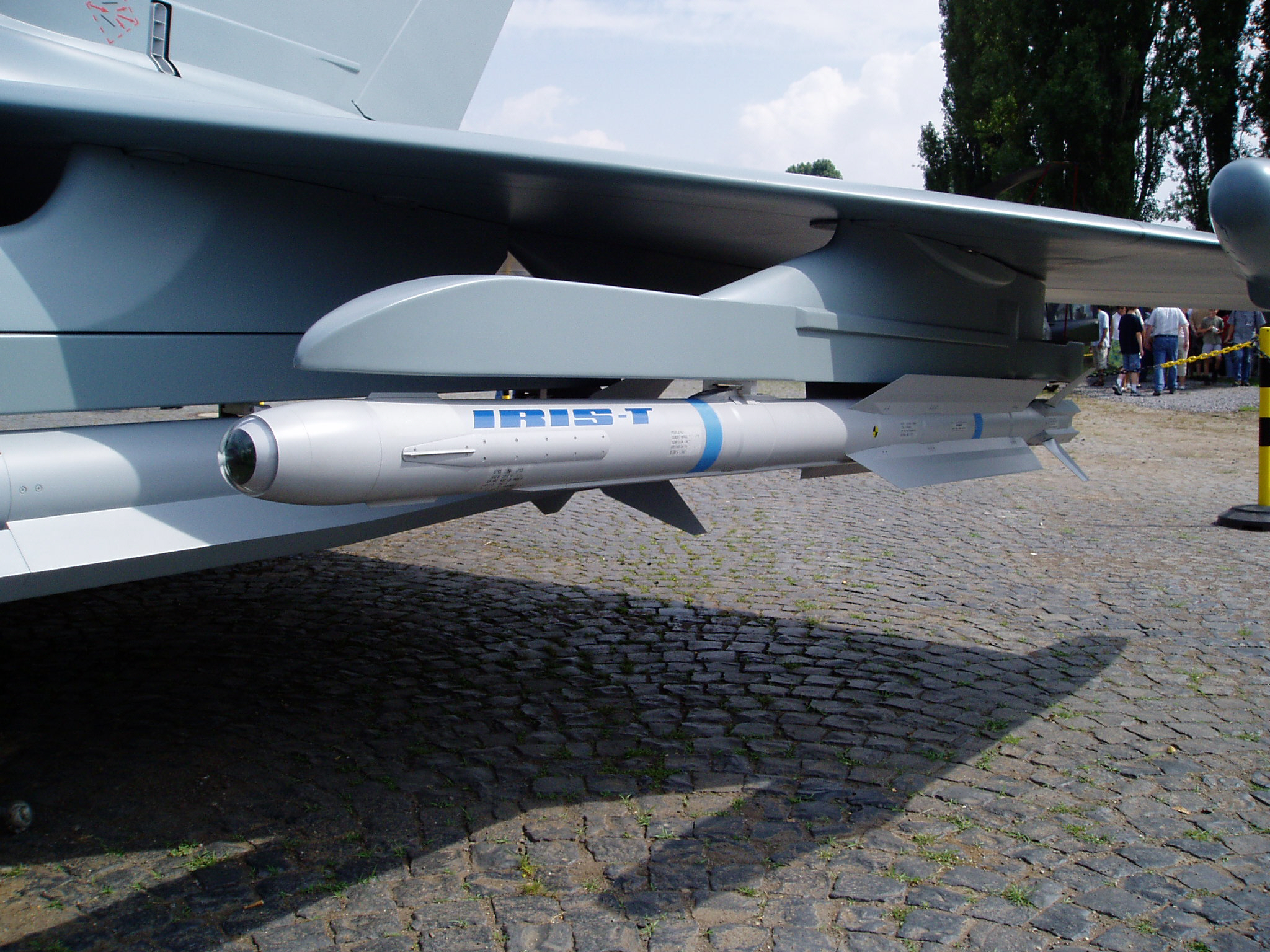
A modern German Air Force IRIS-T infrared homing air-to-air missile

Movement of the seeker head of the IRIS-T

Infrared homing is a passive weapon guidance system which uses the infrared (IR) light emission from a target to track and follow it seamlessly. Missiles which use infrared seeking are often referred to as "heatseekers" since infrared is radiated strongly by hot bodies. Many objects such as people, vehicle engines and aircraft generate and emit heat and so are especially visible in the infrared wavelengths of light compared to objects in the background.

Infrared seekers are passive devices, which, unlike radar, provide no indication that they are tracking a target. That makes them suitable for sneak attacks during visual encounters or over longer ranges when they are used with a forward looking infrared or similar cueing system. Heat-seekers are extremely effective: 90% of all United States air combat losses between 1984 and 2009 were caused by infrared-homing missiles. They are, however, subject to a number of simple countermeasures, most notably by dropping flares behind the target to provide false heat sources. That works only if the pilot is aware of the missile and deploys the countermeasures on time. The sophistication of modern seekers has rendered these countermeasures increasingly ineffective.

The first IR devices were experimented in Germany, the United States, and Japan during World War II. During the war, German engineers were working on heat-seeking missiles and proximity fuses but did not have time to complete development before the war ended. Around the same time, the VB-6 Felix was developed in the United States, but it was not used in combat. The infrared-guided bomb developed in Japan during the same period is known as the "Ke-Go." This, too, failed to reach the stage of practical application. Truly practical designs did not become possible until the introduction of conical scanning and miniaturized vacuum tubes during the war. Anti-aircraft IR systems began in earnest in the late 1940s, but the electronics and the entire field of rocketry were so new that they required considerable development before the first examples entered service in the mid-1950s. The early examples had significant limitations and achieved very low success rates in combat during the 1960s. A new generation developed in the 1970s and the 1980s made great strides and significantly improved their lethality. The latest examples from the 1990s and on have the ability to attack targets out of their field of view (FOV) behind them and even to pick out vehicles on the ground.

IR seekers are also the basis for many semi-automatic command to line of sight (SACLOS) weapons. In this use, the seeker is mounted on a trainable platform on the launcher and the operator keeps it pointed in the general direction of the target manually, often using a small telescope. The seeker does not track the target, but the missile, often aided by flares to provide a clean signal. The same guidance signals are generated and sent to the missile via thin wires or radio signals, guiding the missile into the center of the operator's telescope. SACLOS systems of this sort have been used both for anti-tank missiles and surface-to-air missiles, as well as other roles.

The infrared sensor package on the tip or head of a heat-seeking missile is known as the seeker head. The NATO brevity code for an air-to-air infrared-guided missile launch is Fox Two.

== History ==
=== Early research ===
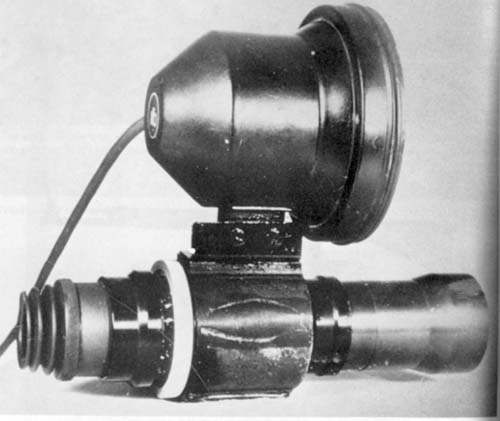
The Vampir nightscope used a photomultiplier as the sighting system and provided illumination with an IR lamp mounted above the scope.

The ability of certain substances to give off electrons when struck by infrared light had been discovered by the Indian polymath Jagadish Chandra Bose in 1901, who saw the effect in galena, known today as lead sulfide, PbS. There was little use and he allowed his 1904 patent to lapse. In 1917, Theodore Case, as part of his work on what became the Movietone sound system, discovered that a mix of thallium and sulfur was much more sensitive but was highly unstable electrically and proved to be of little use as a practical detector. It was used for some time by the US Navy as a secure communications system.

In 1930 the introduction of the Ag–O–Cs (silver–oxygen–cesium) photomultiplier provided the first practical solution to the detection of IR, combining it with a layer of galena as the photocathode. Amplifying the signal emitted by the galena, the photomultiplier produced a useful output that could be used for detection of hot objects at long ranges. This led to developments in a number of nations, notably Britain and Germany where it was seen as a potential solution to the problem of detecting night bombers.

In Britain, research stagnated, with even the main research team at Cavendish Labs expressing their desire to work on other projects, especially after it became clear that radar was going to be a better solution. Frederick Lindemann, Winston Churchill's favorite on the Tizard Committee, remained committed to IR and became increasingly obstructionist to the work of the Committee who were otherwise pressing for radar development. Eventually they dissolved the Committee and reformed, leaving Lindemann off the roster and filling his position with well known radio expert Edward Victor Appleton.

In Germany, radar research was not given nearly the same level of support as in Britain and competed with IR development throughout the 1930s. IR research was led primarily by Edgar Kutzscher at the University of Berlin, working in concert with AEG. By 1940 they had developed the Spanner Anlage (roughly "Peeping Tom system") consisting of a detector photomultiplier placed in front of the pilot, and a large searchlight fitted with a filter to limit the output to the IR range. This provided enough light to see the target at short range, and Spanner Anlage was fitted to a small number of Messerschmitt Bf 110 and Dornier Do 17 night fighters. These proved largely useless, the pilots complained that the target often only became visible at 200 metres (660 ft), when they would have seen it anyway. Only 15 were built and were removed as German airborne radar systems improved though 1942.

AEG had been working with the same systems for use on tanks, and deployed a number of models through the war, with limited production of the FG 1250 beginning in 1943. This work culminated in the Zielgerät 1229 Vampir riflescope which was used with the StG 44 assault rifle for night use.

=== German seekers ===
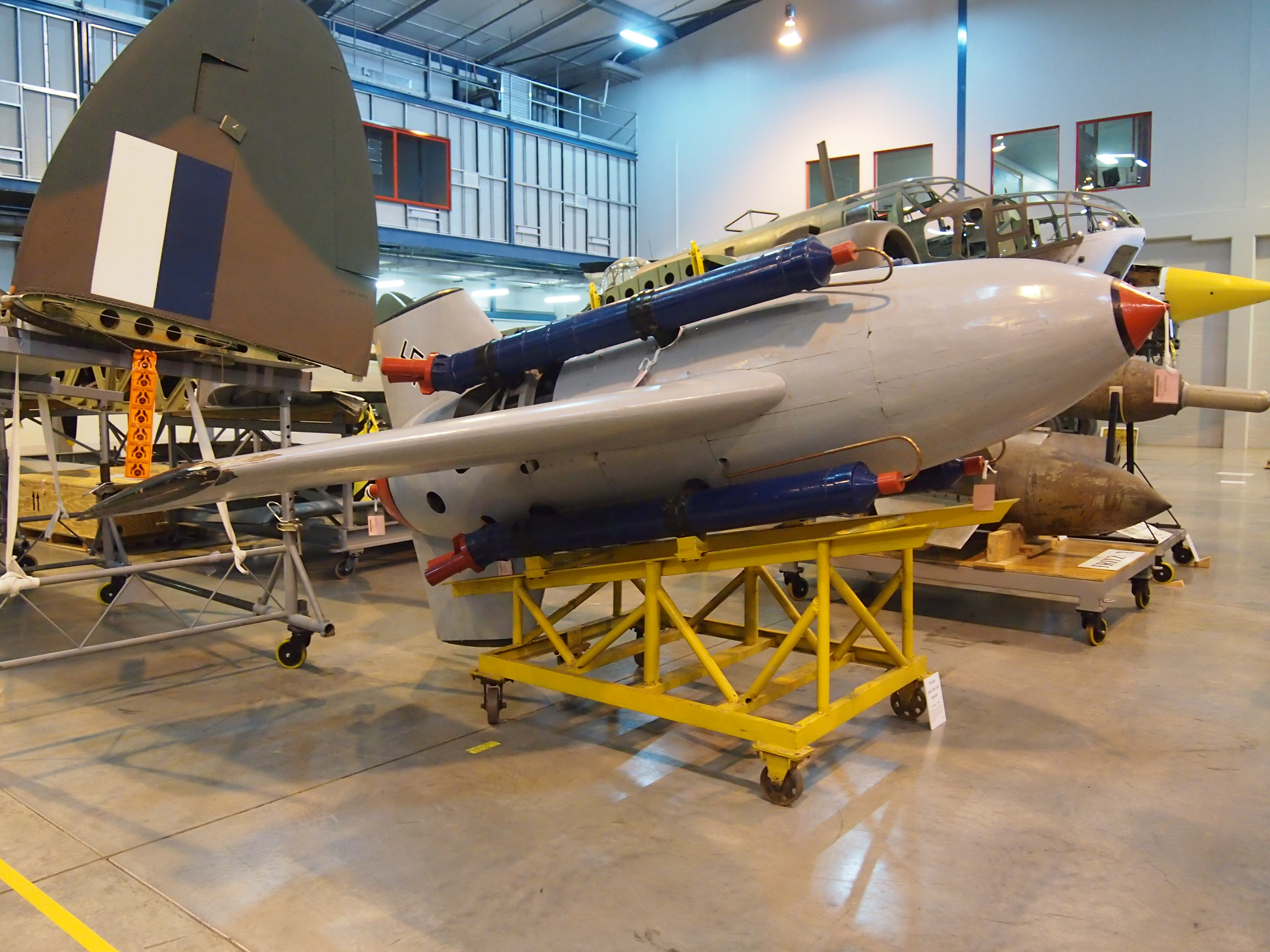
The Madrid seeker was being developed for the Enzian surface-to-air missile.

The devices mentioned previously were all detectors, not seekers. They either produce a signal indicating the general direction of the target, or in the case of later devices, an image similar to a television image. Guidance was entirely manual by an operator looking at the image. There were a number of efforts in Germany during the war to produce a true automatic seeker system, both for anti-aircraft use as well as against ships. These devices were still in development when the war ended; although some were ready for use, there had been no work on integrating them with a missile airframe and considerable effort remained before an actual weapon would be ready for use. Nevertheless, a summer 1944 report to the German Air Ministry stated that these devices were far better developed than competing systems based on radar or acoustic methods.

Aware of the advantages of passive IR homing, the research program started with a number of theoretical studies considering the emissions from the targets. This led to the practical discovery that the vast majority of the IR output from a piston-engine aircraft was between 3 and 4.5 micrometers. The exhaust was also a strong emitter, but cooled rapidly in the air so that it did not present a false tracking target. Studies were also made on atmospheric attenuation, which demonstrated that air is generally more transparent to IR than visible light, although the presence of water vapour and carbon dioxide produced several sharp drops in transitivity. Finally, they also considered the issue of background sources of IR, including reflections off clouds and similar effects, concluding this was an issue due to the way it changed very strongly across the sky. This research suggested that an IR seeker could home on a three-engine bomber at 5 kilometres (3.1 mi) with an accuracy of about 1/10 degree, making an IR seeker a very desirable device.

Kutzscher's team developed a system with the Eletroacustic Company of Kiel known as Hamburg, which was being readied for installation in the Blohm & Voss BV 143 glide bomb to produce an automated fire-and-forget anti-shipping missile. A more advanced version allowed the seeker to be directed off-axis by the bombardier in order to lock on to a target to the sides, without flying directly at it. However, this presented the problem that when the bomb was first released it was traveling too slowly for the aerodynamic surfaces to easily control it, and the target sometimes slipped out from the view of the seeker. A stabilized platform was being developed to address this problem. The company also developed a working IR proximity fuse by placing additional detectors pointing radially outward from the missile centerline, which triggered when the signal strength began to decrease, which it did when the missile passed the target. There was work on using a single sensor for both tasks instead of two separate ones.

Other companies also picked up on the work by Eletroacustic and designed their own scanning methods. AEG and Kepka of Vienna used systems with two movable plates that continually scanned horizontally or vertically, and determined the location of the target by timing when the image disappeared (AEG) or reappeared (Kepka). The Kepka Madrid system had an instantaneous field of view (IFOV) of about 1.8 degrees and scanned a full 20 degree pattern. Combined with the movement of the entire seeker within the missile, it could track at angles as great as 100 degrees. Rheinmetall-Borsig and another team at AEG produced different variations on the spinning-disk system.

=== Post-war designs ===
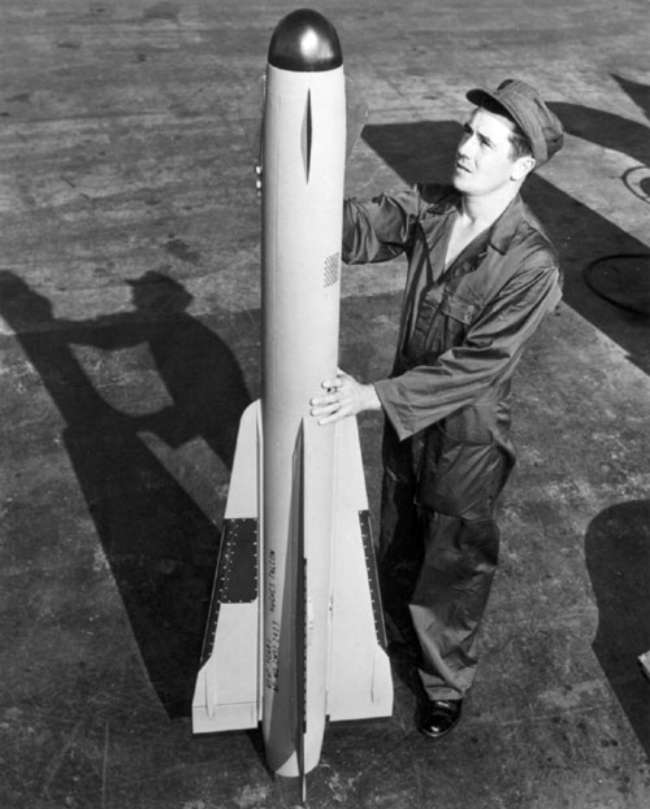
The AIM-4 Falcon was the first IR guided missile to enter service. The translucent dome allows the IR radiation to reach the sensor.

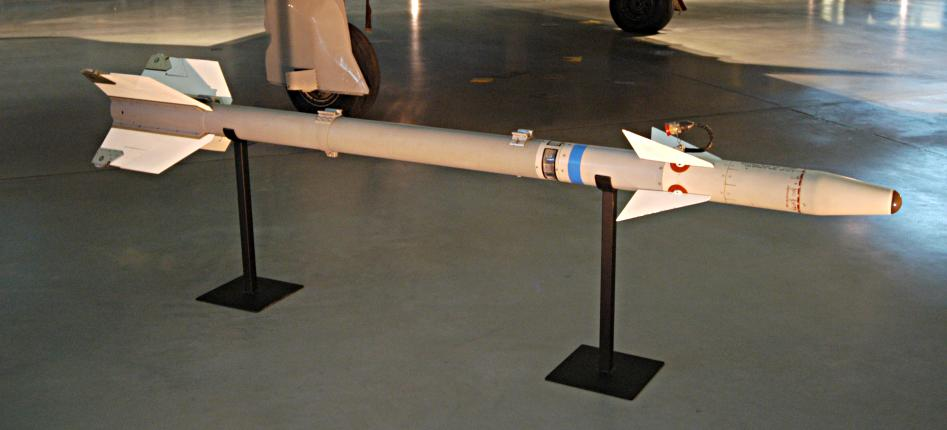
The AIM-9 Sidewinder closely followed Falcon into service. It was much simpler than the Falcon and proved far more effective in combat.

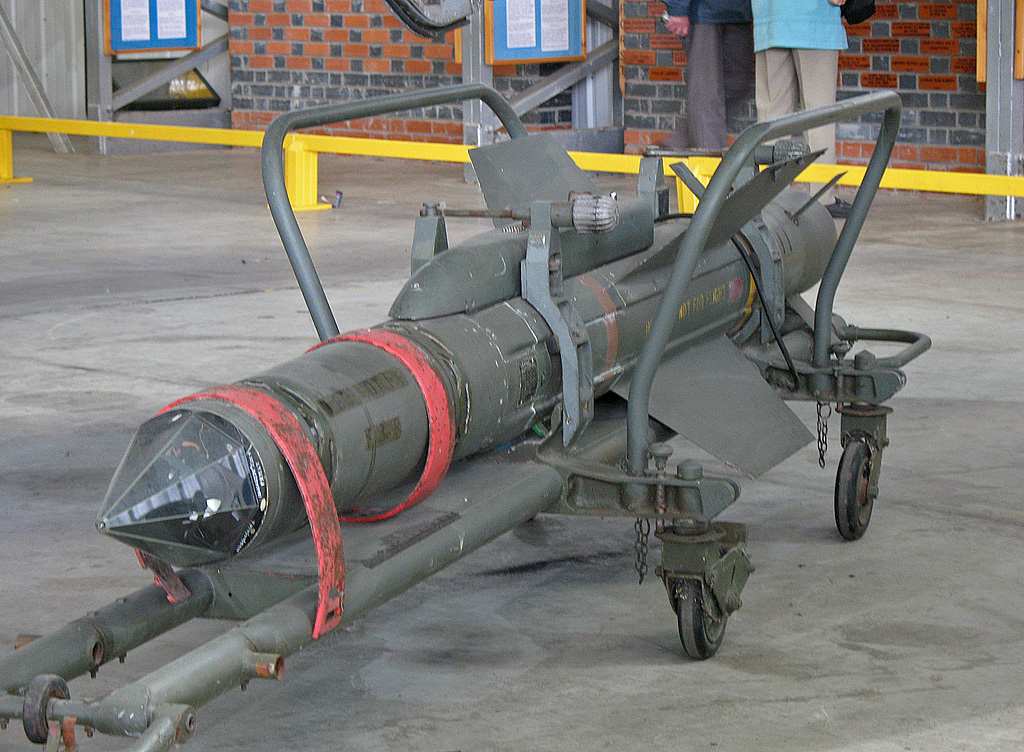
Firestreak was the third IR missile to enter service. It was larger and almost twice as heavy as its US counterparts, much of this due to a larger warhead.

In the post-war era, as the German developments became better known, a variety of research projects began to develop seekers based on the PbS sensor. These were combined with techniques developed during the war to improve accuracy of otherwise inherently inaccurate radar systems, especially the conical scanning system. One such system developed by the US Army Air Force (USAAF), known as the "Sun Tracker", was being developed as a possible guidance system for an intercontinental ballistic missile. Testing this system led to the 1948 Lake Mead Boeing B-29 crash.

USAAF project MX-798 was awarded to Hughes Aircraft in 1946 for an infrared tracking missile. The design used a simple reticle seeker and an active system to control roll during flight. This was replaced the next year by MX-904, calling for a supersonic version. At this stage the concept was for a defensive weapon fired rearward out of a long tube at the back end of bomber aircraft. In April 1949 the Firebird missile project was cancelled and MX-904 was redirected to be a forward-firing fighter weapon. The first test firings began in 1949, when it was given the designation AAM-A-2 (Air-to-air Missile, Air force, model 2) and the name Falcon. IR and semi-active radar homing (SARH) versions both entered service in 1956, and became known as the AIM-4 Falcon after 1962. The Falcon was a complex system offering limited performance, especially due to its lack of a proximity fuse, and managed only a 9% kill ratio in 54 firings during Operation Rolling Thunder in the Vietnam War. However, this relatively low success rate must be appreciated in the context of all these kills representing direct hits, something that was not true of every kill by other American AAMs.

In the same year as MX-798, 1946, William B. McLean began studies of a similar concept at the Naval Ordnance Test Station, today known as Naval Air Weapons Station China Lake. He spent three years simply considering various designs, which led to a considerably less complicated design than the Falcon. When his team had a design they believed would be workable, they began trying to fit it to the newly introduced Zuni 5-inch rocket. They presented it in 1951 and it became an official project the next year. Wally Schirra recalls visiting the lab and watching the seeker follow his cigarette. The missile was given the name Sidewinder after a local snake; the name had a second significance as the sidewinder is a pit viper and hunts by heat, and moves in an undulating pattern not unlike the missile. The Sidewinder entered service in 1957, and was widely used during the Vietnam war. It proved to be a better weapon than the Falcon: B models managed a 14% kill ratio, while the much longer-ranged D models managed 19%. Its performance and lower cost led the Air Force to adopt it as well.

The first heat-seeker built outside the US was the UK's de Havilland Firestreak. Development began as OR.1056 Red Hawk, but this was considered too advanced, and in 1951 an amended concept was released as OR.1117 and given the code name Blue Jay. Designed as an anti-bomber weapon, the Blue Jay was larger, much heavier and flew faster than its US counterparts, but had about the same range. It had a more advanced seeker, using PbTe and cooled to −180 °C (−292.0 °F) by anhydrous ammonia to improve its performance. One distinguishing feature was its faceted nose cone, which was selected after it was found ice would build up on a more conventional hemispherical dome. The first test firing took place in 1955 and it entered service with the Royal Air Force in August 1958.

The French R.510 project began later than Firestreak and entered experimental service in 1957, but was quickly replaced by a radar-homing version, the R.511. Neither was very effective and had short range on the order of 3 km. Both were replaced by the first effective French design, the R.530, in 1962.

The Soviets introduced their first infrared homing missile, the Vympel K-13 in 1961, after reverse engineering a Sidewinder that stuck in the wing of a Chinese MiG-17 in 1958 during the Second Taiwan Strait Crisis. The K-13 was widely exported, and faced its cousin over Vietnam throughout the war. It proved even less reliable than the AIM-9B it was based on, with the guidance system and fuse suffering continual failure.

=== Later designs ===
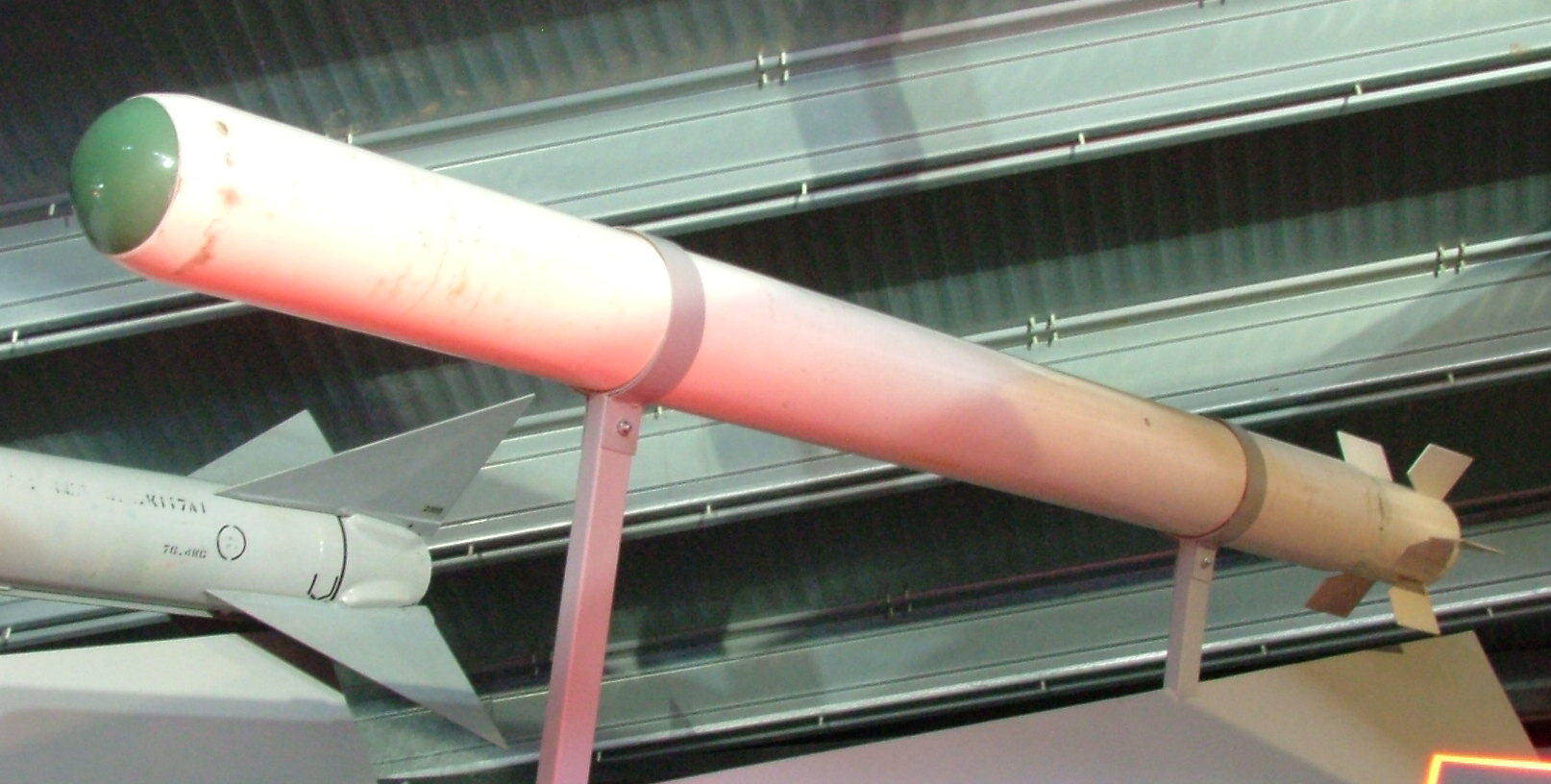
SRAAM was designed to address most of the problems found with earlier IR missiles in a very short-range weapon.

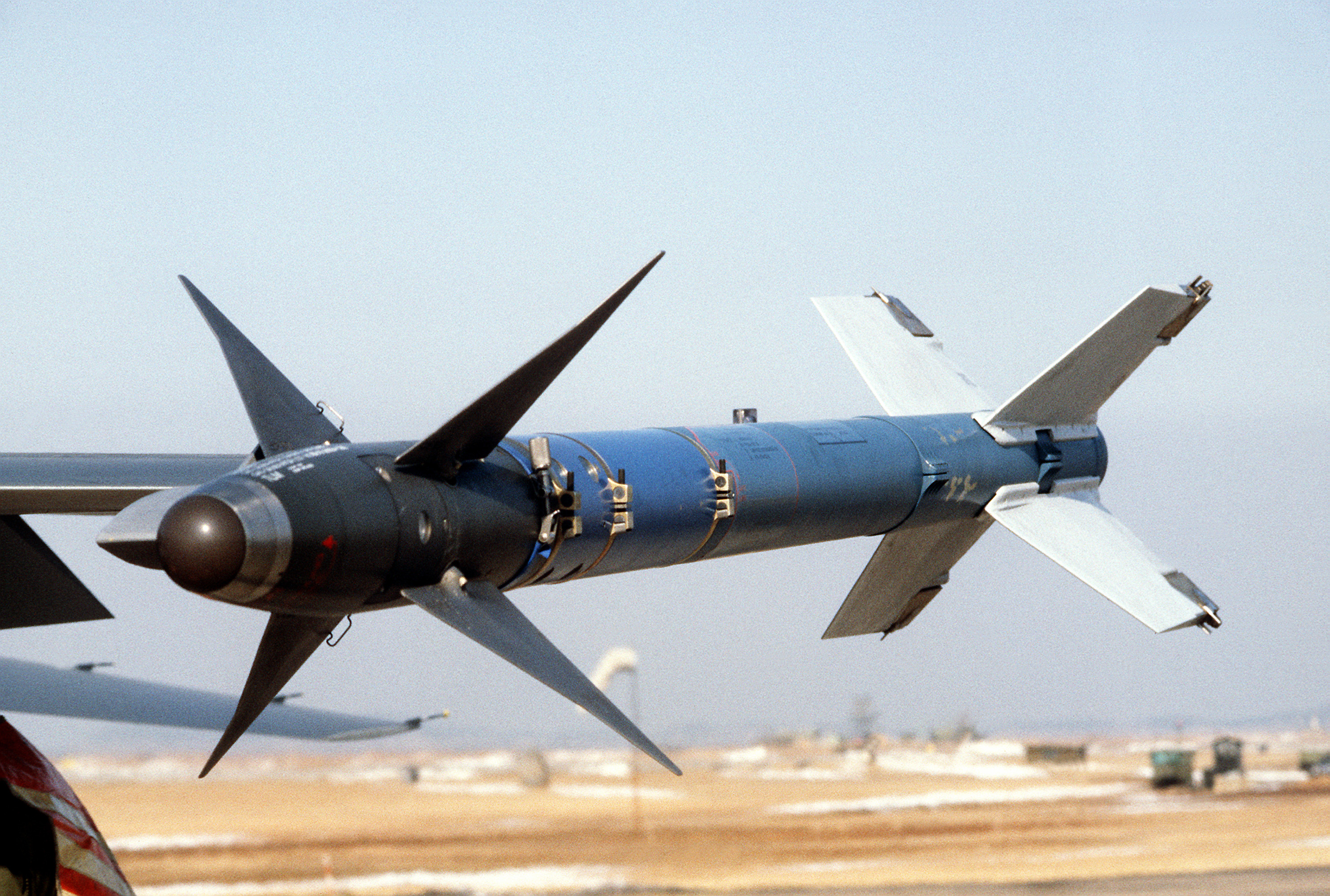
More than half a century after its introduction, upgraded versions of the Sidewinder remain the primary IR missile in most western air forces.

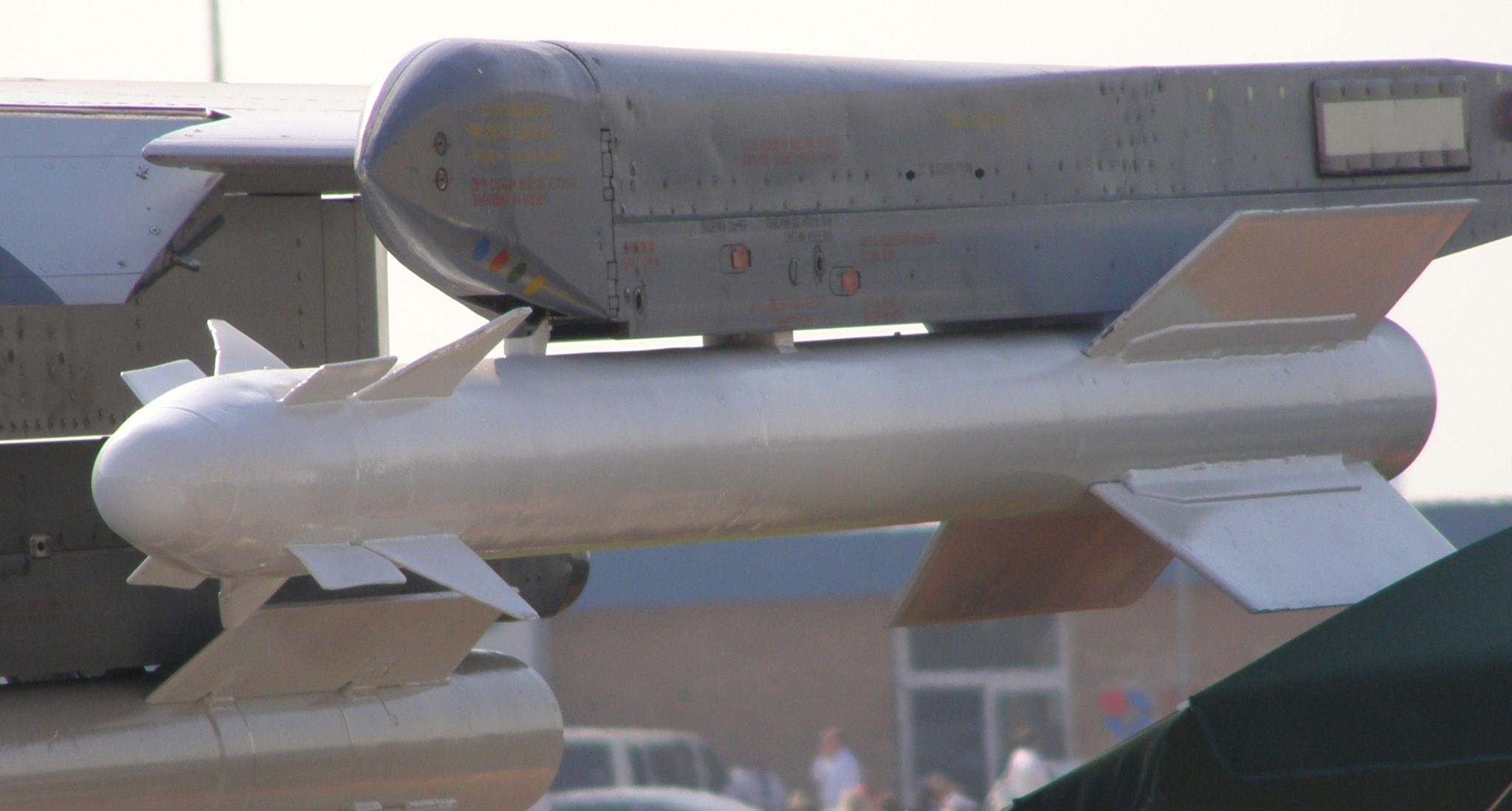
The R-73 was a leap forward for Soviet designs, and cause for considerable worry among western air forces.

As Vietnam revealed the terrible performance of existing missile designs, a number of efforts began to address them. In the US, minor upgrades to the Sidewinder were carried out as soon as possible, but more broadly pilots were taught proper engagement techniques so they would not fire as soon as they heard the missile tone, and would instead move to a position where the missile would be able to continue tracking even after launch. This problem also led to efforts to make new missiles that would hit their targets even if launched under these less-than-ideal positions. In the UK this led to the SRAAM project, which was ultimately the victim of continually changing requirements. Two US programmes, AIM-82 and AIM-95 Agile, met similar fates.

New seeker designs began to appear during the 1970s and led to a series of more advanced missiles. A major upgrade to the Sidewinder began, providing it with a seeker that was sensitive enough to track from any angle, giving the missile all aspect capability for the first time. This was combined with a new scanning pattern that helped reject confusing sources (like the sun reflecting off clouds) and improve the guidance towards the target. A small number of the resulting L models were rushed to the UK just prior to their engagement in the Falklands War, where they achieved an 82% kill ratio, and the misses were generally due to the target aircraft flying out of range. The Argentine aircraft, equipped with Sidewinder B and R.550 Magic, could only fire from the rear aspect, which the British pilots simply avoided by always flying directly at them. The L was so effective that aircraft hurried to add flare countermeasures, which led to another minor upgrade to the M model to better reject flares. The L and M models would go on to be the backbone of Western air forces through the end of the Cold War era.

An even larger step was taken by the Soviets with their R-73, which replaced the K-13 and others with a dramatically improved design. This missile introduced the ability to be fired at targets completely out of view of the seeker; after firing the missile would orient itself in the direction indicated by the launcher and then attempt to lock on. When combined with a helmet mounted sight, the missile could be cued and targeted without the launch aircraft first having to point itself at the target. This proved to offer significant advantages in combat, and caused great concern for Western forces.

The solution to the R-73 problem was initially going to be the ASRAAM, a pan-European design that combined the performance of the R-73 with an imaging seeker. In a wide-ranging agreement, the US agreed to adopt ASRAAM for their new short-range missile, while the Europeans would adopt AMRAAM as their medium-range weapon. However, ASRAAM soon ran into intractable delays as each of the member countries decided a different performance metric was more important. The US eventually bowed out of the program, and instead adapted the new seekers developed for ASRAAM on yet another version of the Sidewinder, the AIM-9X. This so extends its lifetime that it will have been in service for almost a century when the current aircraft leave service. ASRAAM did, eventually, deliver a missile that has been adopted by a number of European forces and many of the same technologies have appeared in the Chinese PL-10 and Israeli Python-5.

=== MANPADs ===
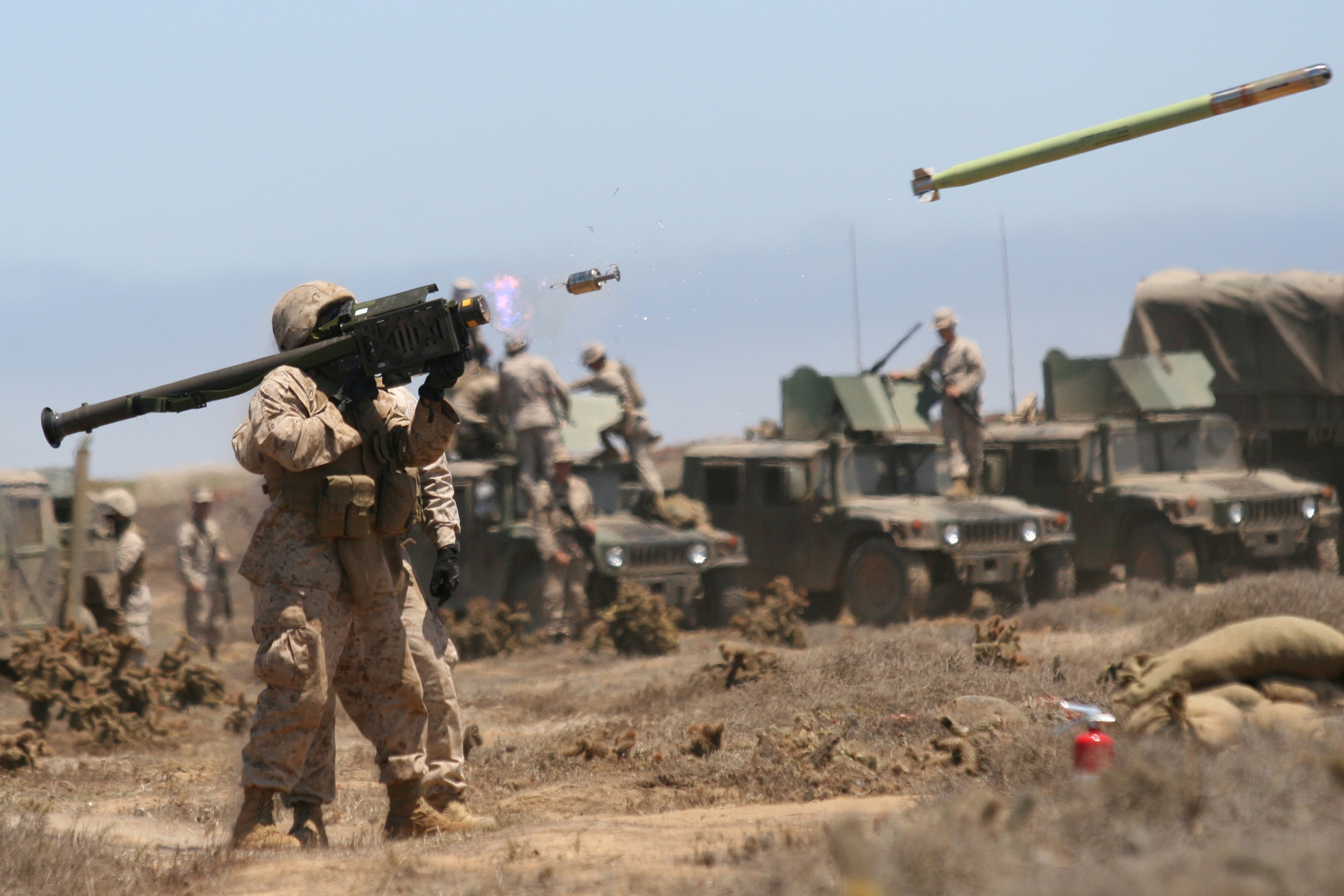
The Stinger has been used in Afghanistan since 1986. It was provided to the anti-Soviet forces by the US

Based on the same general principles as the original Sidewinder, in 1955 Convair began studies on a small man-portable missile (MANPADS) that would emerge as the FIM-43 Redeye. Entering testing in 1961, the preliminary design proved to have poor performance, and a number of major upgrades followed. It was not until 1968 that the Block III version was put into production.

The Soviets started development of two almost identical weapons in 1964, Strela-1 and Strela-2. Development of these proceeded much more smoothly, as the 9K32 Strela-2 entered service in 1968 after fewer years of development than the Redeye. Originally a competing design, the 9K31 Strela-1 was instead greatly increased in size for vehicle applications and entered service at around the same time. The UK began development of its Blowpipe in 1975, but placed the seeker on the launcher instead of the missile itself. The seeker sensed both the target and the missile and sent corrections to the missile via a radio link. These early weapons proved ineffective, with the Blowpipe failing in almost every combat use, while the Redeye fared somewhat better. The Strela-2 did better and claimed a number of victories in the middle east and Vietnam.

A major upgrade program for the Redeye started in 1967, as the Redeye II. Testing did not begin until 1975 and the first deliveries of the now renamed FIM-92 Stinger began in 1978. An improved rosette seeker was added to the B model in 1983, and several additional upgrades followed. Sent to the Soviet–Afghan War, they claimed a 79% success rate against Soviet helicopters, although this is debated. The Soviets likewise improved their own versions, introducing the 9K34 Strela-3 in 1974, and the greatly improved dual-frequency 9K38 Igla in 1983, and Igla-S in 2004.

== Seeker types ==
The three main materials used in the infrared sensor are lead(II) sulfide (PbS), indium antimonide (InSb) and mercury cadmium telluride (HgCdTe). Older sensors tend to use PbS, newer sensors tend to use InSb or HgCdTe. All perform better when cooled, becoming more sensitive and able to detect cooler objects.

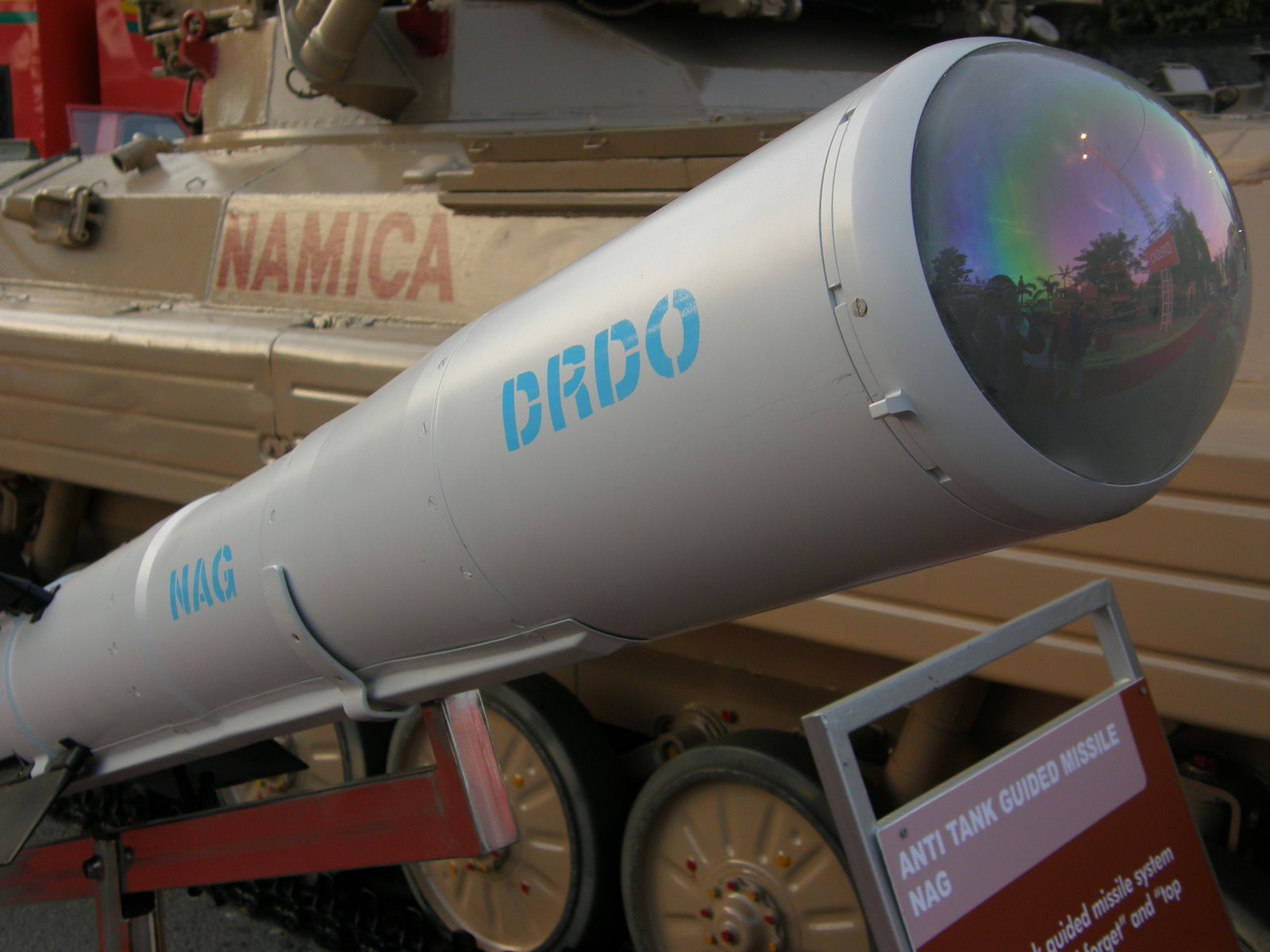
Nag ATGM with imaging infrared seeker (closeup).

Early infrared seekers were most effective in detecting infrared radiation with shorter wavelengths, such as the 4.2 micrometre emissions of the carbon dioxide efflux of a jet engine. This made them useful primarily in tail-chase scenarios, where the exhaust was visible and the missile's approach was carrying it toward the aircraft as well. In combat these proved extremely ineffective as pilots attempted to make shots as soon as the seeker saw the target, launching at angles where the target's engines were quickly obscured or flew out of the missile's field of view. Such seekers, which are most sensitive to the 3 to 5 micrometre range, are now called single-color seekers. This led to new seekers sensitive to both the exhaust as well as the longer 8 to 13 micrometer wavelength range, which is less absorbed by the atmosphere and thus allows dimmer sources like the fuselage itself to be detected. Such designs are known as "all-aspect" missiles. Modern seekers combine several detectors and are called two-color systems.

All-aspect seekers also tend to require cooling to give them the high degree of sensitivity required to lock onto the lower-level signals coming from the front and sides of an aircraft. Background heat from inside the sensor, or the aerodynamically heated sensor window, can overpower the weak signal entering the sensor from the target. (CCDs in cameras have similar problems; they have much more "noise" at higher temperatures.) Modern all-aspect missiles like the AIM-9M Sidewinder and Stinger use compressed gas like argon to cool their sensors in order to lock onto the target at longer ranges and all aspects. (Some such as the AIM-9J and early-model R-60 used a peltier thermoelectric cooler).

== Scanning patterns and modulation ==
The detector in early seekers was barely directional, accepting light from a very wide field of view (FOV), perhaps 100 degrees across or more. A target located anywhere within that FOV produces the same output signal. Since the goal of the seeker is to bring the target within the lethal radius of its warhead, the detector must be equipped with some system to narrow the FOV to a smaller angle. This is normally accomplished by placing the detector at the focal point of a telescope of some sort.

This leads to a problem of conflicting performance requirements. As the FOV is reduced, the seeker becomes more accurate, and this also helps eliminate background sources which helps improve tracking. However, limiting it too much allows the target to move out of the FOV and be lost to the seeker. To be effective for guidance to the lethal radius, tracking angles of perhaps one degree are ideal, but to be able to continually track the target safely, FOVs on the order of 10 degrees or more are desired.

This situation leads to the use of a number of designs that use a relatively wide FOV to allow easy tracking, and then process the received signal in some way to gain additional accuracy for guidance. Generally, the entire seeker assembly is mounted on a gimbal system that allows it to track the target through wide angles, and the angle between the seeker and the missile aircraft is used to produce guidance corrections.

This gives rise the concepts of instantaneous field of view (IFOV) which is the angle the detector sees, and the overall field of view, also known as the tacking angle or off-boresight capability, which includes the movement of the entire seeker assembly. Since the assembly cannot move instantly, a target moving rapidly across the missile's line of flight may be lost from the IFOV, which gives rise to the concept of a tracking rate, normally expressed in degrees per second.

=== Linear scan ===
Some of the earliest German seekers used a linear-scan solution, where vertical and horizontal slits were moved back and forth in front of the detector, or in the case of Madrid, two metal vanes were tilted to block off more or less of the signal. By comparing the time the flash was received to the location of the scanner at that time, the vertical and horizontal angle-off can be determined. However, these seekers also have the major disadvantage that their FOV is determined by the physical size of the slit (or opaque bar). If this is set too small the image from the target is too small to create a useful signal, while setting it too large makes it inaccurate. For this reason, linear scanners have inherent accuracy limitations. Additionally, the dual reciprocating motion is complex and mechanically unreliable, and generally two separate detectors have to be used.

=== Spin-scan ===
Most early seekers used so-called spin-scan, chopper or reticle seekers. These consisted of a transparent plate with a sequence of opaque segments painted on them that was placed in front of the IR detector. The plate spins at a fixed rate, which causes the image of the target to be periodically interrupted, or chopped.

==== Hamburg system ====
The Hamburg system developed during the war is the simplest system, and easiest to understand. Its chopper was painted black on one half with the other half left transparent.

For this description we consider the disk spinning clockwise as seen from the sensor; we will call the point in the rotation when the line between the dark and light halves is horizontal and the transparent side is on the top to be the 12 o'clock position. A photocell is positioned behind the disk at the 12 o'clock position.

A target is located just above the missile. The sensor begins to see the target when the disk is at 9 o'clock, as the transparent portion of the chopper is aligned vertically at the target at 12 o'clock becomes visible. The sensor continues to see the target until the chopper reaches 3 o'clock.

A signal generator produces an AC waveform that had the same frequency as the rotational rate of the disk. It is timed so the waveform reaches its maximum possible positive voltage point at the 12 o'clock position. Thus, during the period the target is visible to the sensor, the AC waveform is in the positive voltage period, varying from zero to its maximum and back to zero.

When the target disappears, the sensor triggers a switch that inverts the output of the AC signal. For instance, when the disk reaches the 3 o'clock position and the target disappears, the switch is triggered. This is the same instant that the original AC waveform begins the negative voltage portion of its waveform, so the switch inverts this back to positive. When the disk reaches the 9 o'clock position the cell switches again, no longer inverting the signal, which is now entering its positive phase again. The resulting output from this cell is a series of half-sine waves, always positive. This signal is then smoothed out to produce a DC output, which is sent to the control system and commands the missile to turn up.

A second cell placed at the 3 o'clock position completes the system. In this case, the switching takes place not at the 9 and 3 o'clock positions, but 12 and 6 o'clock. Considering the same target, in this case, the waveform has just reached its maximum positive point at 12 o'clock when it is switched negative. Following this process around the rotation causes a series of chopped-off positive and negative sine waves. When this is passed through the same smoothing system, the output is zero. This means the missile does not have to correct left or right. If the target were to move to the right, for instance, the signal would be increasingly positive from the smoother, indicating increasing corrections to the right. In practice a second photocell is not required, instead, both signals can be extracted from a single photocell with the use of electrical delays or a second reference signal 90 degrees out of phase with the first.

This system produces a signal that is sensitive to the angle around the clock face, the bearing, but not the angle between the target and the missile centerline, the angle off (or angle error). This was not required for anti-ship missiles where the target is moving very slowly relative to the missile and the missile quickly aligns itself to the target. It was not appropriate for air-to-air use where the velocities were greater and smoother control motion was desired. In this case, the system was changed only slightly so the modulating disk was patterned in a cardioid which blanked out the signal for more or less time depending on how far from the centerline it was. Other systems used a second scanning disk with radial slits to provide the same result but from a second output circuit.

==== Later concepts ====
AEG developed a much more advanced system during the war, and this formed the basis of most post-war experiments. In this case, the disk was pattered with a series of opaque regions, often in a series of radial stripes forming a pizza-slice pattern. Like the Hamburg, an AC signal was generated that matched the rotational frequency of the disk. However, in this case the signal does not turn on and off with angle, but is constantly being triggered very rapidly. This creates a series of pulses that are smoothed out to produce a second AC signal at the same frequency as the test signal, but whose phase is controlled by the actual position of the target relative to the disk. By comparing the phase of the two signals, both the vertical and horizontal correction can be determined from a single signal. A great improvement was made as part of the Sidewinder program, feeding the output to the pilot's headset where it creates a sort of growling sound known as the missile tone that indicates that the target is visible to the seeker.

In early systems this signal was fed directly to the control surfaces, causing rapid flicking motions to bring the missile back into alignment, a control system known as "bang-bang". Bang-bang controls are extremely inefficient aerodynamically, especially as the target approaches the centerline and the controls continually flick back and forth with no real effect. This leads to the desire to either smooth out these outputs, or to measure the angle-off and feed that into the controls as well. This can be accomplished with the same disk and some work on the physical arrangement of the optics. Since the physical distance between the radial bars is larger at the outer position of the disk, the image of the target on the photocell is also larger, and thus has greater output. By arranging the optics so the signal is increasingly cut off closer to the center of the disk, the resulting output signal varies in amplitude with the angle-off. However, it will also vary in amplitude as the missile approaches the target, so this is not a complete system by itself and some form of automatic gain control is often desired.

Spin-scan systems can eliminate the signal from extended sources like sunlight reflecting from clouds or hot desert sand. To do this, the reticle is modified by making one half of the plate be covered not with stripes but a 50% transmission color. The output from such a system is a sine wave for half of the rotation and a constant signal for the other half. The fixed output varies with the overall illumination of the sky. An extended target that spans several segments, like a cloud, will cause a fixed signal as well, and any signal that approximates the fixed signal is filtered out.

A significant problem with the spin-scan system is that the signal when the target is near the center drops to zero. This is because even its small image covers several segments as they narrow at the center, producing a signal similar enough to an extended source that it is filtered out. This makes such seekers extremely sensitive to flares, which move away from the aircraft and thus produce an ever-increasing signal while the aircraft is providing little or none. Additionally, as the missile approaches the target, smaller changes in relative angle are enough to move it out of this center null area and start causing control inputs again. With a bang-bang controller, such designs tend to begin to overreact during the last moments of the approach, causing large miss distances and demanding large warheads.

==== Conical scan ====
A great improvement on the basic spin-scan concept is the conical scanner or con-scan. In this arrangement, a fixed reticle is placed in front of the detector and both are positioned at the focus point of a small Cassegrain reflector telescope. The secondary mirror of the telescope is pointed slightly off-axis, and spins. This causes the image of the target to be spun around the reticle, instead of the reticle itself spinning.

Consider an example system where the seeker's mirror is tilted at 5 degrees, and the missile is tracking a target that is currently centered in front of the missile. As the mirror spins, it causes the image of the target to be reflected in the opposite direction, so in this case the image is moving in a circle 5 degrees away from the reticle's centerline. That means that even a centered target is creating a varying signal as it passes over the markings on the reticle. At this same instant, a spin-scan system would be producing a constant output in its center null. Flares will still be seen by the con-scan seeker and cause confusion, but they will no longer overwhelm the target signal as it does in the case of spin-scan when the flare leaves the null point.

Extracting the bearing of the target proceeds in the same fashion as the spin-scan system, comparing the output signal to a reference signal generated by the motors spinning the mirror. However, extracting the angle-off is somewhat more complex. In the spin-scan system it is the length of time between pulses that encodes the angle, by increasing or decreasing the output signal strength. This does not occur in the con-scan system, where the image is roughly centered on the reticle at all times. Instead, it is the way that the pulses change over the time of one scan cycle that reveals the angle.

Consider a target located 10 degrees to the left of the centerline. When the mirror is pointed to the left, the target appears to be close to the center of the mirror, and thus projects an image 5 degrees to the left of the centerline of the reticle. When it has rotated to point straight up, the relative angle of the target is zero, so the image appears 5 degrees down from the centerline, and when it is pointed to the right, 15 degrees to the left.

Since angle-off on the reticle causes the length of the output pulse to change, the result of this signal being sent into the mixer is frequency modulated (FM), rising and falling over the spin cycle. The rise and fall of this over the spin cycle is due to the fact that, in the same way as the spin-scan, the spokes are more tightly packed towards the center of this 'wagon wheel' pattern. This means the signal achieves a much higher frequency when passing over the densely packed inner spokes in the same timeframe. Conversely, if the signal shifts towards the very edge of the seeker's field of view, the spread-out spokes create a lower frequency. This frequency variation tells the missile that a large correction is required, whereas a narrow frequency swing means that the target is relatively centered. This information is then extracted in the control system for guidance. One major advantage to the con-scan system is that the FM signal is proportional to the angle-off, which provides a simple solution for smoothly moving the control surfaces, resulting in far more efficient aerodynamics. This also greatly improves accuracy; a spin-scan missile approaching the target will be subject to continual signals as the target moves in and out of the centerline, causing the bang-bang controls to direct the missile in wild corrections, whereas the FM signal of the con-scan eliminates this effect and improves circular error probable (CEP) to as little as one meter.

Most con-scan systems attempt to keep the target image as close to the edge of the reticle as possible, as this causes the greatest change in the output signal as the target moves. However, this also often causes the target to move off the reticle entirely when the mirror is pointed away from the target. To address this, the center of the reticle is painted with a 50% transmission pattern, so when the image crosses it the output becomes fixed. But because the mirror moves, this period is brief, and the normal interrupted scanning starts as the mirror begins to point toward the target again. The seeker can tell when the image is in this region because it occurs directly opposite the point when the image falls off the seeker entirely and the signal disappears. By examining the signal when it is known to be crossing this point, an AM signal identical to the spin-scan seeker is produced. Thus, for the cost of additional electronics and timers, the con-scan system can maintain tracking even when the target is off-axis, another major advantage over the limited field of view of spin-scan systems.

==== Crossed array seekers ====
The crossed array seeker simulates the action of a reticle in a con-scan system through the physical layout of the detectors themselves. Classical photocells are normally round, but improvements in construction techniques and especially solid-state fabrication allows them to be built in any shape. In the crossed-array system (typically) four rectangular detectors are arranged in a cross-like shape (+). Scanning is carried out identically to the con-scan, which causes the image of the target to scan across each of the detectors in turn.

For a target centered in the FOV, the image circles around the detectors and crosses them at the same relative point. This causes the signal from each one to be identical pulses at a certain point in time. However, if the target is not centered, the image's path will be offset, as before. In this case the distance between the separated detectors causes the delay between the signal's reappearance to vary, longer for images further from the centerline, and shorter when closer. Circuits connected to the mirrors produce this estimated signal as a control, as in the case of the con-scan. Comparing the detector signal to the control signal produces the required corrections.

The advantage to this design is that it allows for greatly improved flare rejection. Because the detectors are thin from side to side, they effectively have an extremely narrow field of view, independent of the telescope mirror arrangement. At launch, the location of the target is encoded into the seeker's memory, and the seeker determines when it expects to see that signal crossing the detectors. From then on any signals arriving outside the brief periods determined by the control signal can be rejected. Since flares tend to stop in the air almost immediately after release, they quickly disappear from the scanner's gates. The only way to spoof such a system is to continually release flares so some are always close to the aircraft, or to use a towed flare.

=== Rosette seekers ===
The rosette seeker, also known as a pseudoimager, uses much of the mechanical layout of the con-scan system, but adds another mirror or prism to create a more complex pattern, drawing out a rosette. Compared to the fixed angle of the con-scan, the rosette pattern causes the image to scan to greater angles. Sensors on the drive shafts are fed to a mixer that produces a sample FM signal. Mixing this signal with the one from the seeker removes the motion, producing an output signal identical to that from the con-scan. A major advantage is that the rosette seeker scans out a wider portion of the sky, making it much more difficult for the target to move out of the field of view.

The downside to the rosette scan is that it produces a very complex output. Objects within the seeker's FOV produce completely separate signals as it scans around the sky; the system might see the target, flares, the sun and the ground at different times. In order to process this information and extract the target, the individual signals are sent into a computer memory. Over the period of the complete scan this produces a 2D image, which gives it the name pseudo imager. Although this makes the system more complex, the resulting image offers much more information. Flares can be recognized and rejected by their small size, clouds for their larger size, etc.

=== Imaging systems ===
Modern heat-seeking missiles use imaging infrared (IIR), where the IR/UV sensor is a focal plane array which is able to produce an image in infra-red, much like the charge-coupled device (CCD) in a digital camera. This requires much more signal processing but can be much more accurate and harder to fool with decoys. In addition to being more flare-resistant, newer seekers are also less likely to be fooled into locking onto the sun, another common trick for avoiding heat-seeking missiles. By using the advanced image processing techniques, the target shape can be used to find its most vulnerable part toward which the missile is then steered. All western short-range air-to-air missiles such as the AIM-9X Sidewinder, MICA IR and ASRAAM use imaging infrared seekers, as well as the Chinese PL-10 SRAAM and Israeli Python-5.

== Countermeasures ==
There are two primary ways to defeat IR seekers, using flares or IR jammers.

=== Flares ===
Early seekers did not image the target, and anything within their FOV would create an output. A flare released by the target causes a second signal to appear within the FOV, producing a second angle output, and the chance that the seeker will begin to aim at the flare instead. Against early spin-scan seekers this was extremely effective because the signal from the target was minimized through the midcourse, so even a dim signal from the flare would be seen and tracked. Of course if this happens, the flare now disappears from view and the aircraft becomes visible again. However, if the aircraft moves out of the FOV during this time, which happens rapidly, the missile can no longer reacquire the target.

One solution to the flare problem is to use a dual-frequency seeker. Early seekers used a single detector that was sensitive to very hot portions of the aircraft and to the jet exhaust, making them suitable for tail-chase scenarios. To allow the missile to track from any angle, new detectors were added that were much more sensitive in other frequencies as well. This presented a way to distinguish flares; the two seekers saw different locations for the target aircraft - the aircraft itself as opposed to its exhaust - but a flare appeared at the same point at both frequencies. These could then be eliminated.

More complex systems were used with digital processing, especially crossed-array and rosette seekers. These had such extremely narrow instantaneous fields of view (IFOV) that they could be processed to produce an image, in the same fashion as a desktop scanner. By remembering the location of the target from scan to scan, objects moving at high speeds relative to the target could be eliminated. This is known as cinematic filtering. The same process is used by imaging systems, which image directly instead of scanning, and have the further capability of eliminating small targets by measuring their angular size directly.

=== Jammers ===
Early seeker systems determined the angle to the target through timing of the reception of the signal. This makes them susceptible to jamming by releasing false signals that are so powerful that they are seen even when the seeker reticle is covering the sensor. Early jammers like the AN/ALQ-144 used a heated block of silicon carbide as an IR source, and surround it with a spinning set of lenses that send the image as a series of spots sweeping around the sky. Modern versions more typically use an infrared laser shining on a rapidly rotating mirror. As the beam paints the seeker it causes a flash of light to appear out of sequence, disrupting the timing pattern used to calculate angle. When successful, IR jammers cause the missile to fly about randomly.

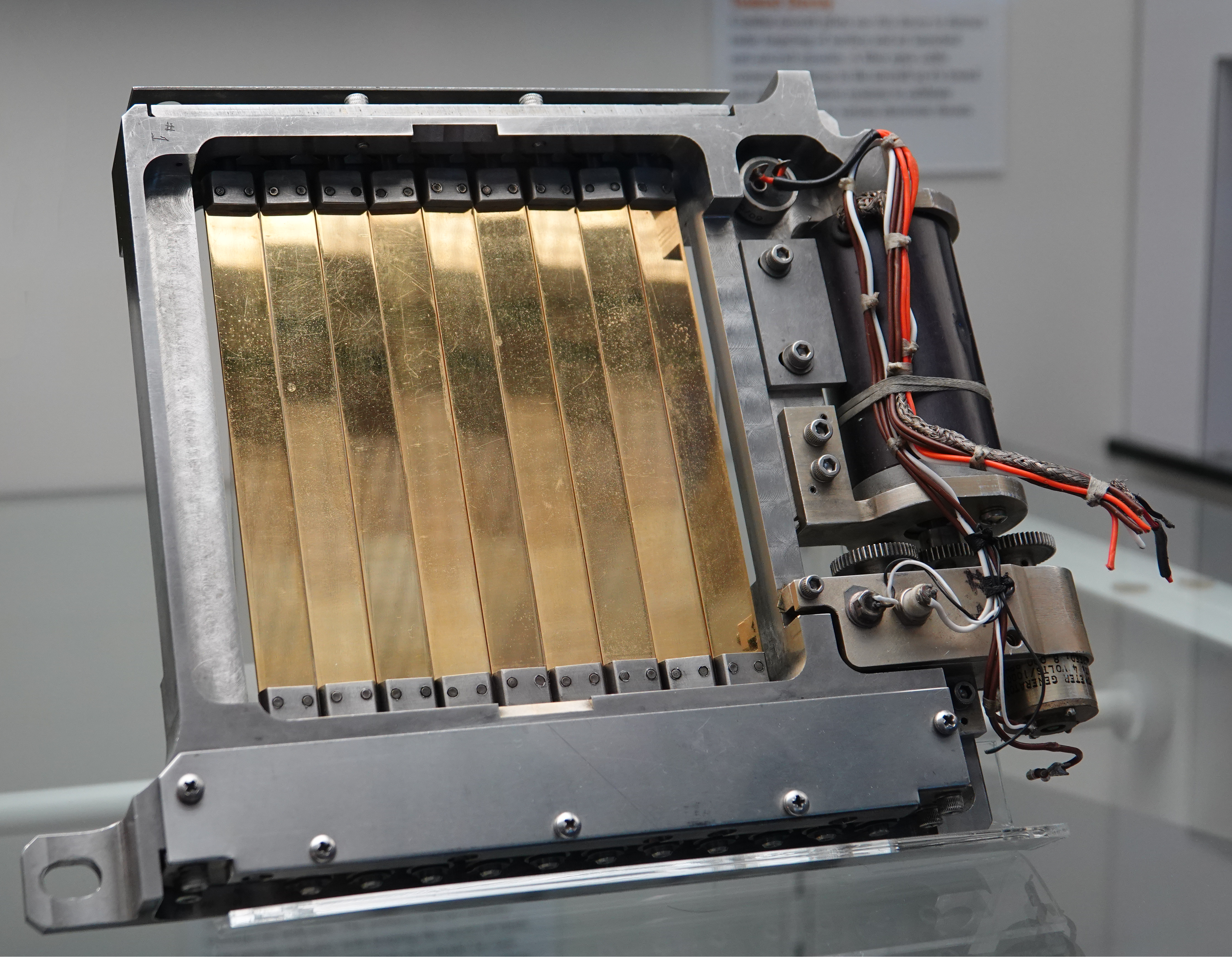
BAE Venetian Blind Filter for "Hot Brick" Infrared Jammer

IR jammers are far less successful against modern imaging seekers, because they do not rely on timing for their measurements. In these cases, the jammer may be detrimental, as it provides additional signal at the same location as the target. Some modern systems now locate their jammers on towed countermeasures pods, relying on the missile homing on the strong signal, but modern image processing systems can make this ineffective and may require the pod to look as much as possible like the original aircraft, further complicating the design.

A more modern laser-based technique removes the scanning and instead uses some other form of detection to identify the missile and aim the laser directly at it. This blinds the seeker continually, and is useful against even modern imaging seekers. These directional infrared countermeasures (DIRCMs) are very effective, but they are also very expensive and generally only suitable for aircraft that are not maneuvering, like cargo aircraft and helicopters. Their implementation is further complicated by placing filters in front of the imager to remove any off-frequency signals, requiring the laser to tune itself to the frequency of the seeker or sweep through a range. Some work has even been put into systems with enough power to optically damage the nose cone or filters within the missile, but this remains beyond current capabilities.

== Tracking ==
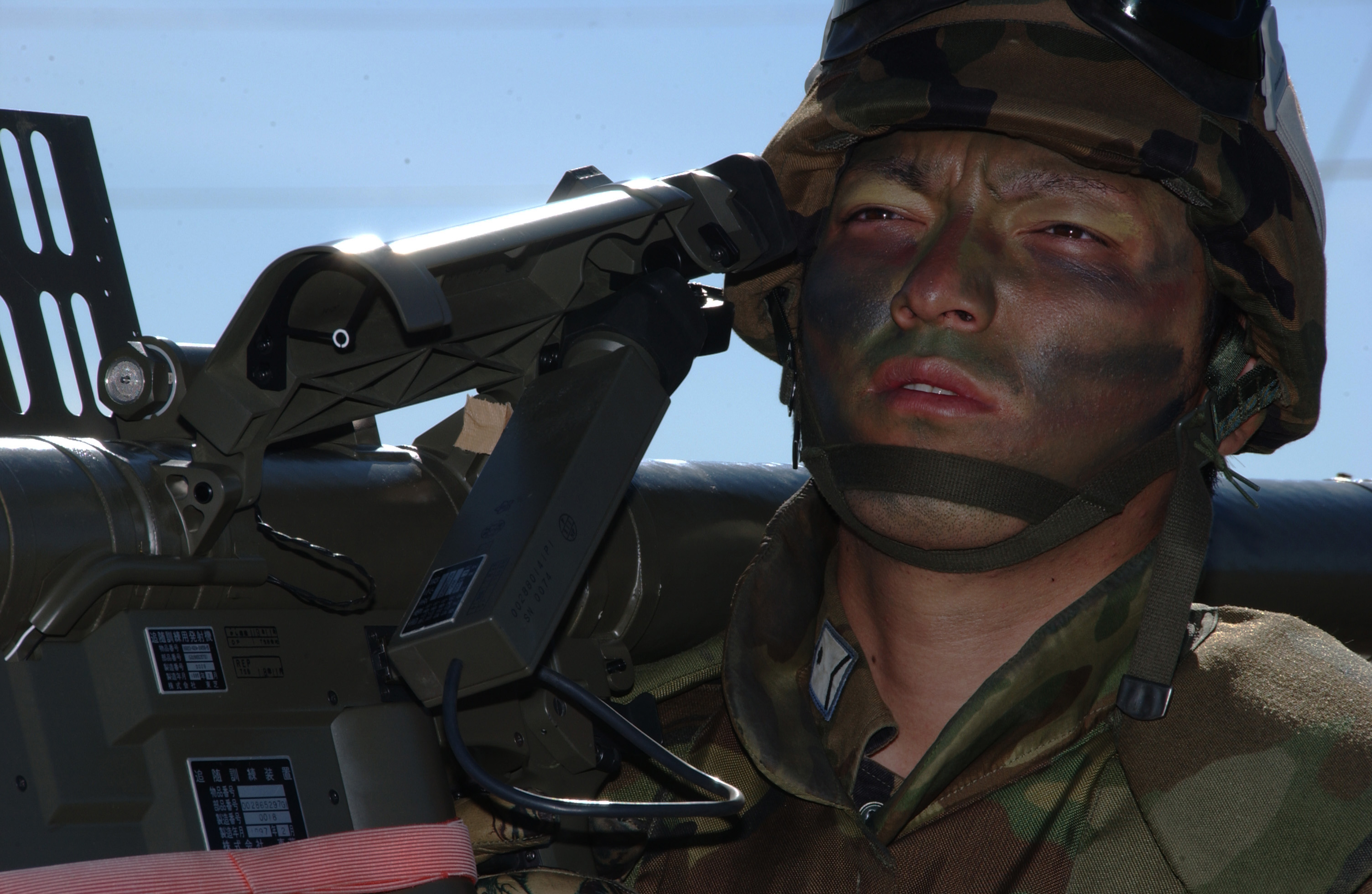
The Type 91 surface-to-air missile MANPAD has an optical seeker mounted as a means of tracking airborne targets.

Most infrared-guided missiles have their seekers mounted on a gimbal. This allows the sensor to be pointed at the target when the missile is not. This is important for two main reasons. One is that before and during launch, the missile cannot always be pointed at the target. Rather, the pilot or operator points the seeker at the target using radar, a helmet-mounted sight, an optical sight or possibly by pointing the nose of the aircraft or missile launcher directly at the target. Once the seeker sees and recognizes the target, it indicates this to the operator who then typically "uncages" the seeker (which is allowed to follow the target). After this point the seeker remains locked on the target, even if the aircraft or launching platform moves. When the weapon is launched, it may not be able to control the direction it points until the motor fires and it reaches a high enough speed for its fins to control its direction of travel. Until then, the gimballed seeker needs to be able to track the target independently.

Finally, even while it is under positive control and on its way to intercept the target, it probably will not be pointing directly at it; unless the target is moving directly toward or away from the launching platform, the shortest path to intercept the target will not be the path taken while pointing straight at it, since it is moving laterally with respect to the missile's view. The original heat-seeking missiles would simply point towards the target and chase it; this was inefficient. Newer missiles are smarter and use the gimballed seeker head combined with what is known as proportional guidance in order to avoid oscillation and to fly an efficient intercept path.

== See also ==
- Infrared countermeasures
- Directional Infrared Counter Measures
- Infra-red search and track
- Active radar homing
