= Lock-on after launch =

Missile tracking capability

Lock-on after launch (LOAL) is the ability of missile systems to lock-on to a target after being launched from a carrier vehicle. The term is normally used in reference to airborne weapons, especially air-to-air missiles, though more modern air-to-surface missiles and surface-to-surface missiles are starting to display this capability as well. Most, if not all loitering munitions are incapable of LOBL targeting (definition below), and thus use LOAL targeting. LOAL is an important part of modern weapon systems as it allows a weapon to be carried internally (onboard an aircraft) to increase stealth and then to acquire a target once it has been launched.

LOAL systems normally rely on cuing from a helmet-mounted sight or onboard sensors such as radar or forward-looking infrared (FLIR) and use a simple strapdown inertial guidance system to know where to look after launch. Most air-to-air missiles use two or more guidance methods to achieve LOAL capability. The missile will enter inertial-guidance mode after launch until its seeker is activated and begins scanning the predicted target location. If the missile is also equipped with data link capability, it will be able to receive continuous target location data from the aircraft, guiding it toward the designated target.

LOAL allows a missile to activate its seeker to lock onto the target after flying a certain distance. This liberates the missile from the limitation imposed by the seeker’s performance and lets it make full use of the missile’s own flight performance to achieve a larger operational range. For example, after introducing LOAL capability, the AIM-9X Sidewinder increased its operational range by about 33%, achieving great head-on performance which is comparable to most BVR missiles.

Examples of LOAL weapons include the Advanced Short Range Air-to-Air Missile (ASRAAM), later versions of the AGM-114 Hellfire anti-tank missile as well as the LR, LR2, ER, ER2 and NLOS variants of the Spike anti-tank missile.

The older method of launch has retroactively become known as lock-on before launch (LOBL), although this term is not commonly used and is a "retronym" that distinguishes it from the LOAL method.

== Example ==
In 2003, during a missile test conducted by Rafael Advanced Defense Systems, a Python-5 missile executed a LOAL engagement against a target located 15 nautical miles (27.8 km) away. Before launch, the missile had already received target position data from the onboard radar. It followed a high trajectory. Eventually, the Python-5’s seeker activated at a distance of 5 nautical miles (9.3 km) from the target and began to scan the predicted target location.

== See also ==
- Index of aviation articles
