= AIM-95 Agile =

American air-to-air missile

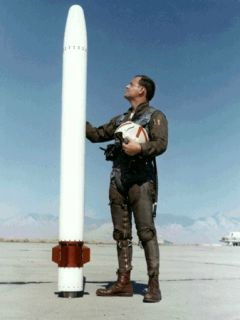
U.S. Navy photo of an AIM-95 missile.

The AIM-95 Agile was an infared (IR) guided air-to-air missile developed by the United States. It was developed by the US Navy to equip the F-14 Tomcat, replacing the AIM-9 Sidewinder. Around the same time, the US Air Force was designing the AIM-82 to equip their F-15 Eagle, and later dropped their efforts to join the Agile program. In the end, newer versions of Sidewinder would close the performance gap so much that the Agile program was canceled.

== Overview ==
=== Background ===
Early infrared homing missiles had two limitations that made them difficult to use in combat situations. The first was that the seeker was relatively insensitive and required large, hot sources to reliably track a target. In practice, this meant the engine of the enemy aircraft had to remain visible to the missile through the shot. The other was that the seeker had a limited field of view (FOV), meaning it could only see the target if it was in front of the missile.

These limitations were made clear during the Vietnam War, when early missiles like the AIM-4 Falcon and AIM-9 Sidewinder had success rates on the order of 9 and 14%, respectively. Much of this was because pilots had been trained to approach using radar or ground-controlled interception, which placed the enemy aircraft somewhere in front of them, but not necessarily flying in the same direction. In these situations, the seeker might see the target's engine and send the growling signal that indicated lock-on, but would fail to track when fired because the target would move out of the FOV in the time while the missile was flying off the mounting rail.

Faced with these dismal results, the US Navy and then US Air Force introduced new training syllabuses that placed much more emphasis on pre-shot manoeuvring, so the launch aircraft would be both behind the target and flying in the same general direction. This would maximize the chance that the target would still be visible to the missile after it was launched. Unfortunately, such manoeuvring was both time consuming and potentially difficult to arrange, and in combat, there were many situations where a target would cross in front of the fighter in a "snap shot". To provide some capability in these situations, autocannons were hastily added to those fighters that lacked them.

=== Agile ===
In the late 1960s the Navy began development of the Grumman F-14 Tomcat fighter, which offered dramatically improved performance over their F-4 Phantoms. The Tomcat's origins begin in the Fleet Air Defense (FAD) concept that was based on aircraft carrying very long-range missiles and radars, allowing them to attack enemy aircraft at ranges on the order of 100 miles (160 km).

While the FAD was being developed, experience over Vietnam was clearly demonstrating that the idea of all-long-range combat was simply not possible given tactical limitations. The need for improved manoeuvrability over the lumbering FAD design was clear, and this developed into the VFX proposal that in turn produced the Tomcat. The need for a better short-range missile to equip it for times when the aircraft was forced to close on its target was also clear.

Given the dismal results with their current short-range missile, the Sidewinder, the China Lake Naval Weapons Center began development of a dramatically improved missile to replace it. Studies had demonstrated two primary sources of misses; one was taking shots when the missile could not successfully track the target, and the other was when the missile ran out of fuel trying to chase down a target at longer ranges. The new design would address both of these problems; a new seeker would allow lock-on from any angle including the front of the aircraft, greatly improved manoeuvrability would allow it to attack targets even at rapid crossing speeds, and a larger and more powerful motor would give it equal or greater range under all conditions.

The resulting Agile design was equipped with an infrared seeker for fire and forget operation. The seeker had a high off-boresight lock-on capability capable of being targeted by a Helmet Mounted Sight (HMS), allowing it to be fired at targets which were not directly ahead, making it far easier to achieve a firing position. The solid-propellant rocket used thrust vectoring for control giving it superior turning capability over the Sidewinder.

At the time the navy was developing VFX, the Air Force was developing its F-X concept, which emerged with an almost identical set of requirements as VFX. And as part of that project, they also concluded they needed a much better missile, and began the AIM-82 to that requirement. Since both missiles were more or less identical in their role, it was decided to abandon the AIM-82 in favour of the Agile.

== AIMVAL ==
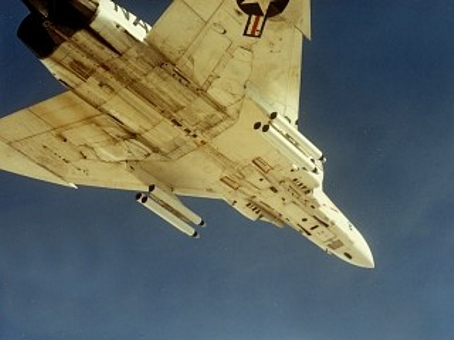
VX-5 F-4 Phantom with prototype Agile seekers

The AIM-95A was developed to a point where flight tests were carried out including test firing at China Lake and inclusion in the ACEVAL/AIMVAL Joint Test & Evaluation conducted with both the F-14 and F-15 at Nellis AFB in 1975–78. As a result of escalating costs, the project was canceled in 1975. Instead, an improved version of the Sidewinder was developed for use by both the Air Force and Navy. Although this was intended to be an interim solution, in fact, the AIM-9 continues in service today.

While the AIM-95 program was being carried out, the Royal Air Force had come to similar conclusions about the need for a new high-maneuverability missile. However, their studies suggested a much smaller, shorter-range weapon was the correct solution, a "gun that fires around corners". This led to the Taildog concept, which became SRAAM, which was ultimately canceled in favor of Skyflash. The Soviet Union also began development of an advanced high off-boresight SRM with thrust vectoring and subsequently fielded the R-73/AA-11 Archer on the MiG-29 in 1985. NATO learned about their performance due to the German reunification and efforts began to match or exceed the R-73's performance with the IRIS-T, AIM-9X and MICA IR programs.

== See also ==
- List of missiles
