= ASRAAM =

Advanced Short Range Air-to-Air Missile

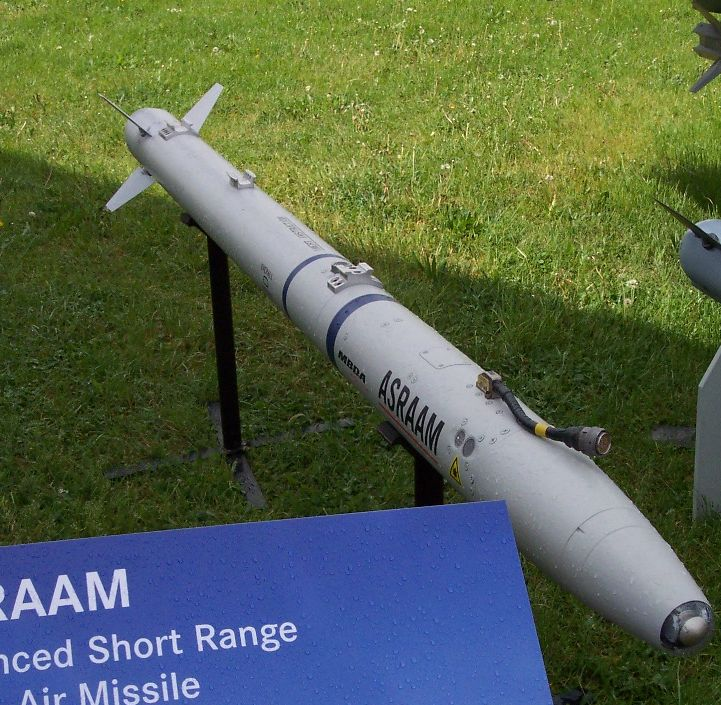
- ASRAAM at ILA 2006
- Type: ASRAAM: Short-range air-to-air missile; Raven: Short-range surface-to-air missile system
- Place of origin: United Kingdom

Service history
- In service: 1998
- Used by: Royal Air Force; Armed Forces of Ukraine; Indian Air Force; Royal Australian Air Force (historical)
- Wars: Russo-Ukrainian War (Raven)

Production history
- Manufacturer: MBDA UK; Bharat Dynamics Limited (India)
- Unit cost: >£200,000
- Variants: Common Anti-aircraft Modular Missile (Sea Ceptor/Sky Sabre)

Specifications
- Mass: 88 kg (194 lb)
- Length: 2.90 m (9 ft 6 in)
- Diameter: 166 mm (6.5 in) (motor diameter)
- Wingspan: 450 mm
- Warhead: 10 kg (22 lb) blast/fragmentation
- Detonation mechanism: Laser proximity fuze and impact
- Engine: Dual-burn, high-impulse solid rocket motor
- Operational range: Air-to-air: 25+ km; Surface-to-air: 15 km
- Maximum speed: Mach 3+
- Guidance system: Blocks 1-5: Hughes (Raytheon) Imaging infrared homing, 128×128 element focal plane array, with lock-on after launch (LOAL) and strapdown inertial guidance; Block 6+: Domestic MBDA UK Seeker
- Launch platform: Royal Air Force: Typhoon; Royal Air Force and Royal Navy: F-35 Lightning II; Indian Air Force: Jaguar; SHORAD (e.g. Raven, a 'FrankenSAM' vehicle consisting of a Supacat 6×6 mounted with ASRAAM launch rails taken from decommissioned RAF jets)

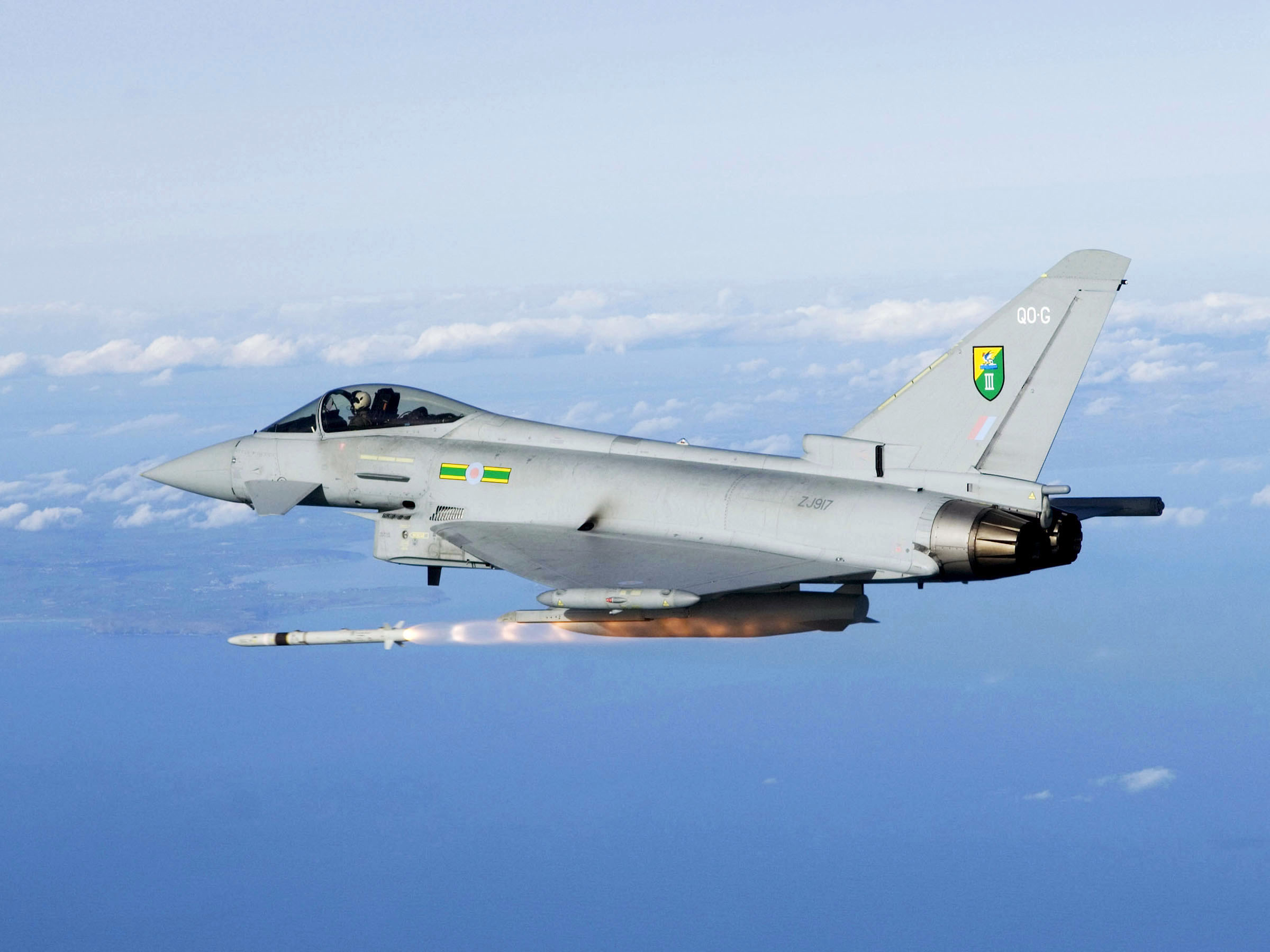
RAF Typhoon of 3 Squadron fires ASRAAM in 2007

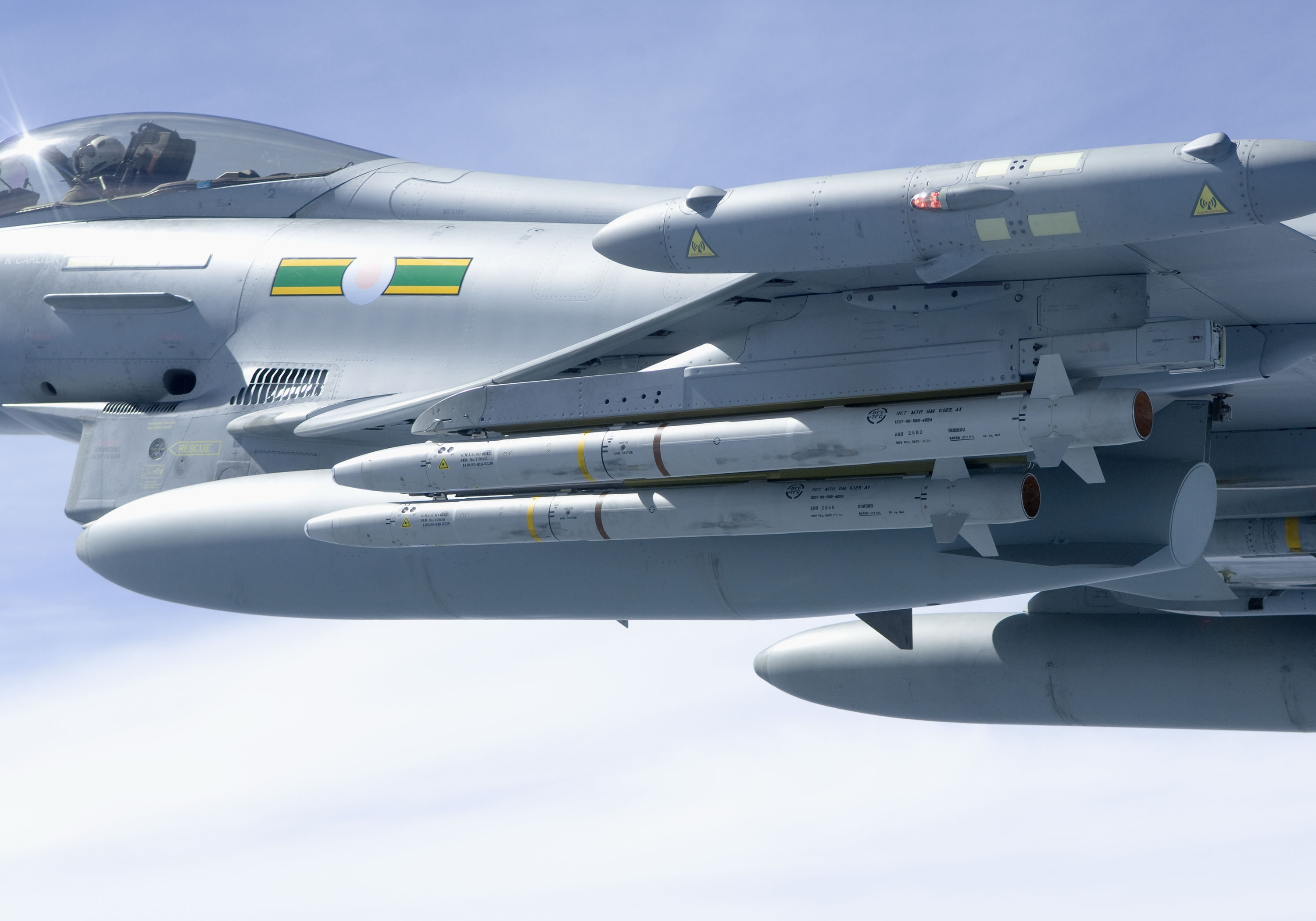
Two ASRAAM (centre) on an RAF Typhoon in 2007

The Advanced Short Range Air-to-Air Missile (ASRAAM), also known by its United States designation AIM-132, is an imaging infrared homing air-to-air missile, produced by MBDA UK, that is designed for close-range combat. It is in service in the Royal Air Force (RAF), replacing the AIM-9 Sidewinder. The ASRAAM is designed to allow the pilot to fire and then turn away before the opposing aircraft can close for a shot. It flies at over Mach 3 to ranges in excess of 25 kilometres (16 mi). It retains a 50 g maneuverability provided by body lift and tail control.

The project started as a British-German collaboration in the 1980s. It was part of a wider agreement in which the US would develop the AIM-120 AMRAAM for medium-range use, while the ASRAAM would replace the Sidewinder with a design that would cover the great range disparity between the Sidewinder and the AMRAAM. Germany left the programme in 1989. The British proceeded on their own and the missile was introduced into RAF service in 1998. It is being introduced to the Indian Air Force, the Qatar Air Force and the Royal Air Force of Oman, and formerly saw service in the Royal Australian Air Force.

The ASRAAM is also the base design for the Common Anti-Aircraft Modular Missile (CAMM) used by the British Army, Royal Navy and several allied forces in the surface-launched role. A surface-launched variant of the ASRAAM itself, called Raven, has been improvised for the Armed Forces of Ukraine.

== History ==
In the 1980s, NATO countries signed a Memorandum of Agreement that the United States would develop the AIM-120 Advanced Medium-Range Air-to-Air Missile (AMRAAM), while a primarily British and German team would develop a short-range air-to-air missile to replace the Sidewinder. The team included the UK (Hawker Siddeley, by this point known as BAe Dynamics) and Germany (Bodensee Gerätetechnik), each holding a 42.5 per cent share, Canada at 10 per cent and Norway at 5 per cent. The US assigned this missile the name AIM-132 ASRAAM.

=== New ASRAAM ===
The rapid decline and eventual fall of the Soviet Union in the late 1980s led to considerably less interest in the ASRAAM. By February 1988 the US was already agitating for changes. In July 1989 the Germans exited the programme effectively ending the agreement. Various reasons are often cited including the ending of the Cold War and full realisation of the capabilities of the Russian R-73 missile, but many commentators think this was a smokescreen for financial and defence industrial share issues.

This left Britain in charge of the project and they began redefining it purely to RAF needs and tenders were invited in 1989. This led to the selection of a new Hughes focal plane array imaging array seeker instead of the more conventional design previously used, dramatically improving performance and countermeasure resistance. A UK contest in 1990 examined the new ASRAAM, the French MICA and a new design from Bodensee Gerätetechnik, their version of the ASRAAM tuned for German needs. In 1992 the Ministry of Defence announced that ASRAAM had won the contest, and production began in March that year. The German design, by now part of Diehl BGT Defence, became the IRIS-T.

While ASRAAM was entering production, momentum behind US-led industrial and political lobbying grew significantly and, combined with the strengthening European economy, forced the US government to conclude testing in June 1996 and move away from the ASRAAM program.

UK development and manufacture went ahead and the first ASRAAM was delivered to the Royal Air Force (RAF) in late 1998. It equips the RAF's Typhoon. It was also used by the RAF's Harrier GR7 and Tornado GR4 forces until their retirement. In February 1998 ASRAAM was selected by the Royal Australian Air Force (RAAF) for use on their F/A-18 Hornets following competitive evaluation of the improved ASRAAM, the Rafael Python 4 and the AIM-9X, and entered RAAF service in August 2004. In March 2009 the RAAF successfully carried out the first in-service "Lock-on after launch" firing of an ASRAAM at a target located behind the wing-line of the "shooter" aircraft.

== Characteristics ==
ASRAAM is a high speed, extremely manoeuvrable, heat-seeking, air-to-air missile. Built by MBDA UK, it is designed as a "fire-and-forget" missile. ASRAAM is intended to detect and launch against targets at much longer ranges, as far as early versions of the AMRAAM, in order to shoot down the enemy long before it closes enough to be able to fire its own weapons. In this respect the ASRAAM shares more in common with the AMRAAM than other IR missiles, although it retains high manoeuvrability. To provide the needed power, the ASRAAM is built on a 16.51 cm (6½ inch) diameter rocket motor compared with Sidewinder's (AIM-9M and X) and IRIS-T's 12.7 cm (5-inch) motors (which trace their history to the 1950s unguided Zuni rocket). This gives the ASRAAM more thrust.

The main improvement is a new 128×128 resolution imaging infrared focal plane array (FPA) seeker manufactured by Hughes before they were acquired by Raytheon. This seeker has a long acquisition range, high countermeasures resistance, approximately 90-degree off-boresight lock-on capability, and the possibility to designate specific parts of the targeted aircraft (like cockpit, engines, etc.). The ASRAAM also has a LOAL (Lock-on after launch) ability (as do the AIM-9X and IRIS-T) which is a distinct advantage when the missile is carried in an internal bay such as in the F-35 Lightning II. However in 2012 the requirement for ASRAAM internal carriage on the F-35 was dropped, and the aircraft now uses external carriage only. The ASRAAM warhead is triggered either by laser proximity fuse or impact. A laser proximity fuse was selected because RF fuses are vulnerable to EW intervention from enemy jammers. The increased diameter of ASRAAM also provides space for increased computing power, and so improved counter counter-measure capabilities compared with other dogfighting missiles such as AIM-9X.

== Developments ==
On 8 July 2014, Indian Ministry of Defence signed a £250m ($428m) contract with MBDA to purchase 384 ASRAAM short range air-to-air missile to equip its SEPECAT/HAL Jaguar strike aircraft fleet and replace the ageing Matra Magic R550. MBDA's offering overcame competition from competitors including Rafael's Python-5 missile, emerging as the winner in 2012. This built on an existing 2012 order for 493 MICA missiles to replace Matra S-530D and Magic II missiles as part of an Indian Air Force Mirage 2000 upgrade.

In September 2015, the UK's MoD signed a £300 million contract for a new and improved version of the ASRAAM that would leverage new technological developments, including those from the CAMM missile. This variant was to replace the existing one when it went out of service in 2022. A further £184 million contract was awarded in August 2016 to provide additional stocks of the new ASRAAM for the UK's F-35B. This new variant will be operationally ready on the Eurofighter Typhoon in 2018 and on the UK's F-35Bs from 2022 onwards.

In February 2017, successful firing of ASRAAMs from F-35 Lightning IIs were conducted at Naval Air Station Patuxent River and Edwards Air Force Base in the USA. This represented the first time that a British-designed missile had been fired from an F-35 JSF and the first time any non-US missile had ever been fired from the aircraft.

As of 31 January 2019, the Indian Air Force is testing the compatibility of the ASRAAM weapons system with the Sukhoi Su-30MKI, and aims to make the ASRAAM its standardised short range missile across multiple aircraft types, including the Tejas. Final testing and operational clearance are to be achieved by the end of 2019. Bharat Dynamics Limited will produce the missile at its Bhanoor unit. The facility will also offer maintenance, repair and overhaul services.

== Variants ==
=== ASRAAM P3I ===
In 1995, Hughes and British Aerospace collaborated on the "P3I ASRAAM", a version of ASRAAM as a candidate for the AIM-9X program. The ultimate winner was the Hughes submission using the same seeker but with the rocket motor, fuse and warhead of the AIM-9M. The latter was a US Air Force stipulation to ease the logistics burden and save money by reusing as much as possible of the existing AIM-9 Sidewinder, of which 20,000 remained in the US inventory.

=== ASRAAM Block 6 ===
ASRAAM Block 6 standard, developed under the ASRAAM Sustainment programme, entered service on the Typhoon in April 2022, and will enter F-35 service in 2024. The Block 6 introduces new and updated sub-systems, and replaces external cooling with a new internal cooler. The original Raytheon seeker has been replaced with a new UK-built seeker of higher resolution. There are no US-made components, meaning that it does not come under ITAR restrictions and can therefore be exported without US approval.

=== Raven ===
Raven is a surface-to-air missile system with a 15 km range, improvised for use in Ukraine. The system uses a Supacat HMT 600 6×6 high-mobility tactical vehicle equipped with two ASRAAM missiles.

=== NGCCM ===
ASRAAM was selected as the Next-Generation Close Combat Missile to replace R-73. The missile will be equipped on SEPECAT Jaguar and HAL Tejas fleet of the Indian Air Force. On 23 August 2021, MBDA and Bharat Dynamics Limited (BDL) signed a licensing agreement to establish a Final assembly, integration and test (FAIT) facility within BDL's current Hyderabad manufacturing complex. The facility could also provide maintenance, repair, and overhaul services for the ASRAAM. Around April 2026, the Indian Air Force issued separate request for proposals (RfP) to invite bids from the Indian industry to integrate the ASRAAM missiles onboard 56 Mikoyan MiG-29UPG aircraft, including 8 twin-seater variants, as well as 74 Jaguar aircraft. ASRAAM will replace in-service R-73 and R.550 Magic missiles.

== Common Anti-Air Modular Missile (CAMM) ==
At the DSEi conference in September 2007 it was announced that the UK MoD was funding a study by MBDA to investigate a replacement for the Sea Wolf and Rapier missiles for the Royal Navy and British Army respectively. The Common Anti-Air Modular Missile (CAMM) would share components with ASRAAM, such as the very low signature rocket motor from Roxel and the warhead and proximity fuze from Thales but with updated electronics, an active RF seeker and data link so allowing for mid-course corrections from suitably-equipped land or even air platforms. CAMM began entering service in 2018 and has since been sold to nine other nations for both land and naval use. It has since become a family of weapons with a number of additional missile variants on order or in development.

== Operational history ==
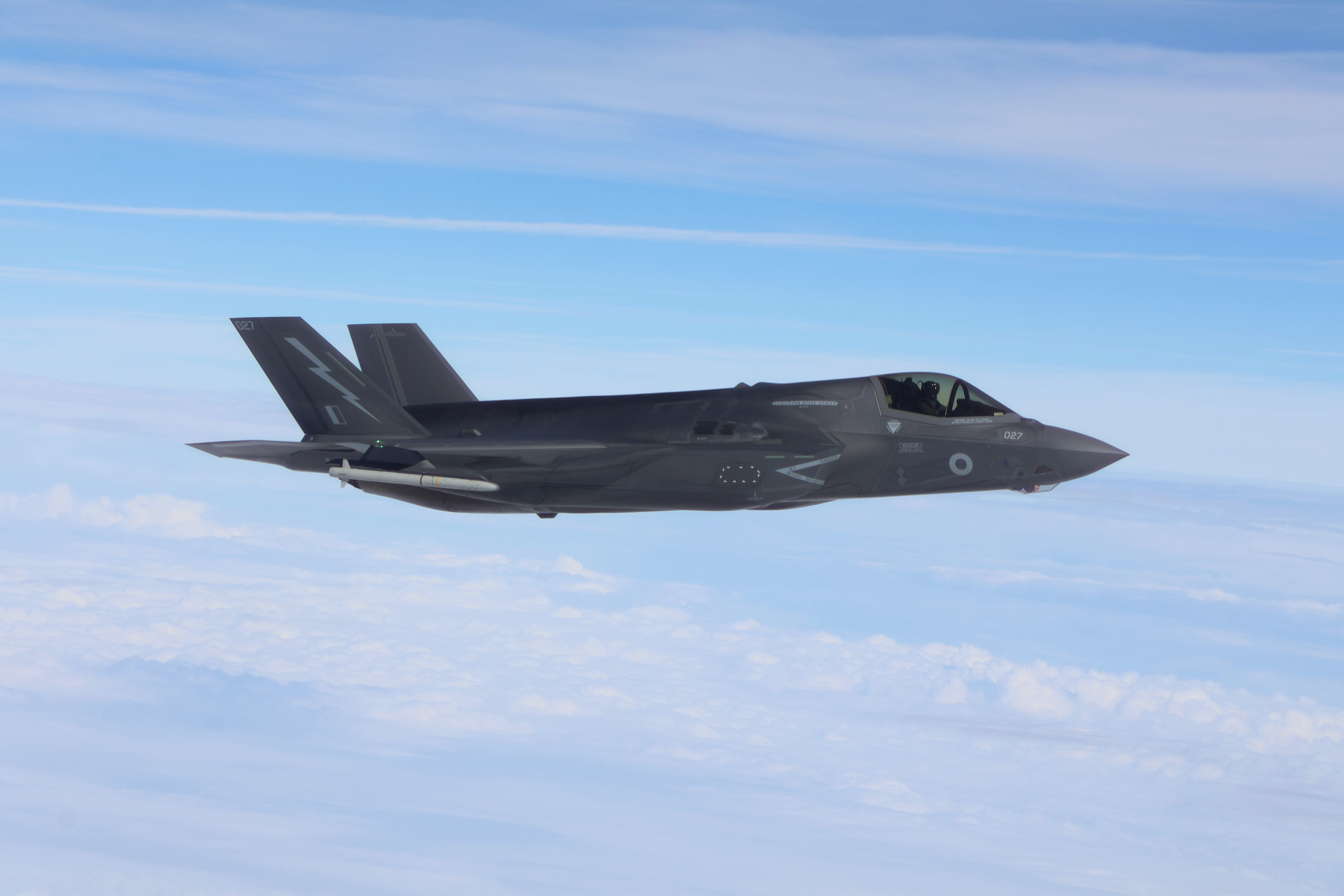
An RAF F-35B armed with ASRAAM missiles

=== Royal Air Force ===
On 14 December 2021, a RAF Typhoon operating against Islamic State in southern Syria shot down a hostile drone with an ASRAAM missile. This was the first time the British military had shot down an enemy aircraft since the Falklands War. Shortly after the outbreak of the 2026 Iran war in early March 2026, an F-35B of No. 617 Squadron RAF operating from RAF Akrotiri shot down two Iranian drones while operating over Jordan with two ASRAAM missiles.

=== Armed Forces of Ukraine (Surface-launched ASRAAM – Raven) ===
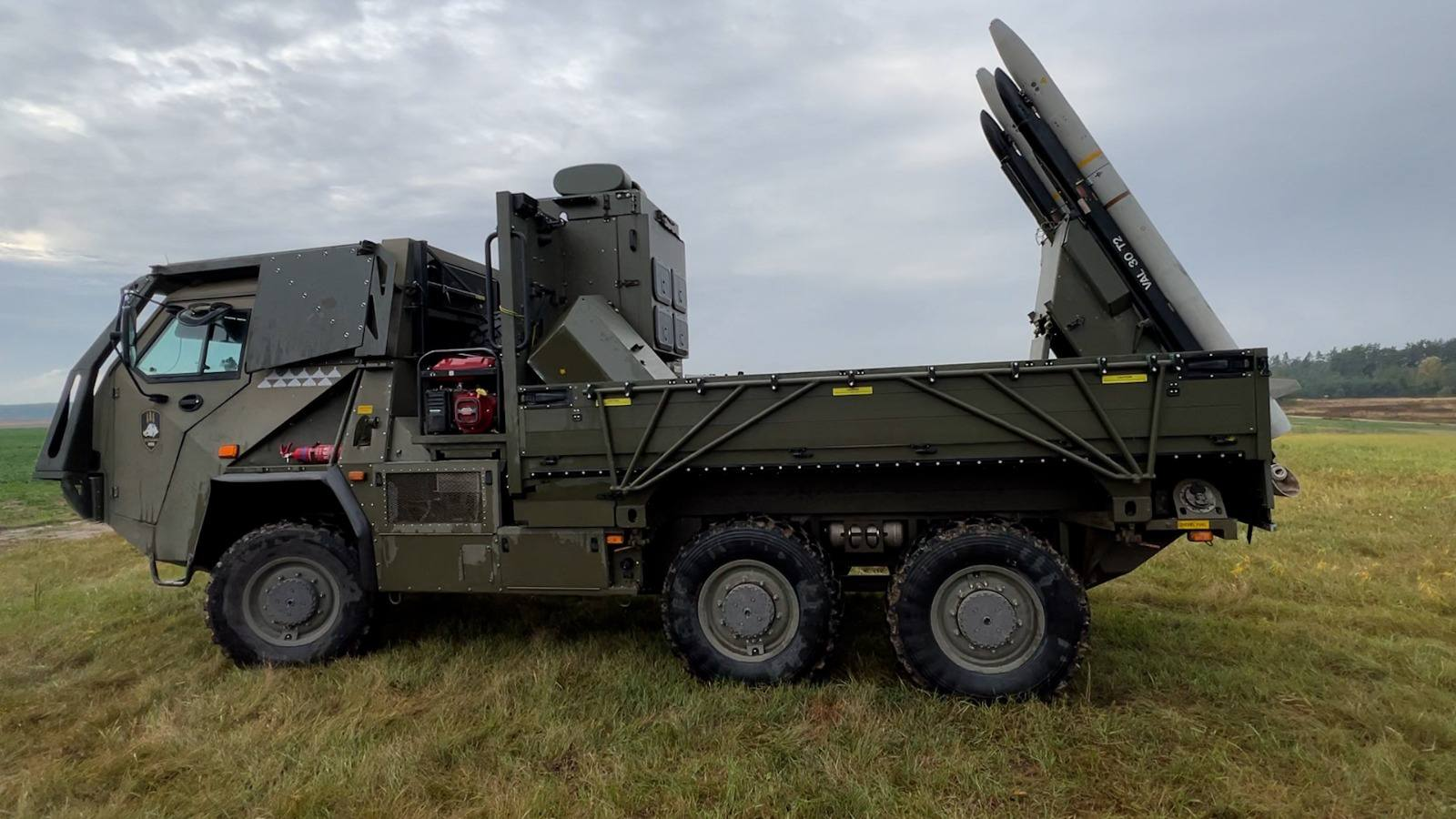
A Ukrainian Raven SAM launcher

In August 2023, it emerged that Ukraine had been provided an unknown number of improvised ground-based launch platforms for ASRAAM, known as Ravens. Developed in four months by a joint MBDA and MoD team, it has been used by the Armed Forces of Ukraine to provide short range air defence (SHORAD) against Russian aerial threats such as helicopters, cruise missiles and drones such as the HESA Shahed 136. The system has a twin-launcher mounted on the back of a Supacat HMT 600 vehicle, allowing it to remain mobile, whilst guidance can be provided by a Hawkeye electro-optical suite. The rails for the launchers have been sourced from de-commissioned Hawk, Jaguar, and Tornado jets. The missile has a "fire and forget" capacity. Reportedly, the system has achieved a 70% success rate during over 400 engagements. This system is not to be confused with the dedicated surface-launched development of ASRAAM, CAMM/Sky Sabre air defence system. In 2023, Ukraine started using AIM-132 ASRAAM missiles in defensive measures. On 7 May 2024 footage was published showing the first confirmed loss of a Ukrainian ASRAAM Supacat-based launcher, which was destroyed by a ZALA Lancet.

In May 2025, it was announced by the MOD that eight of these systems had already been sent to Ukraine, and that five more were scheduled to be sent.

== Operators ==
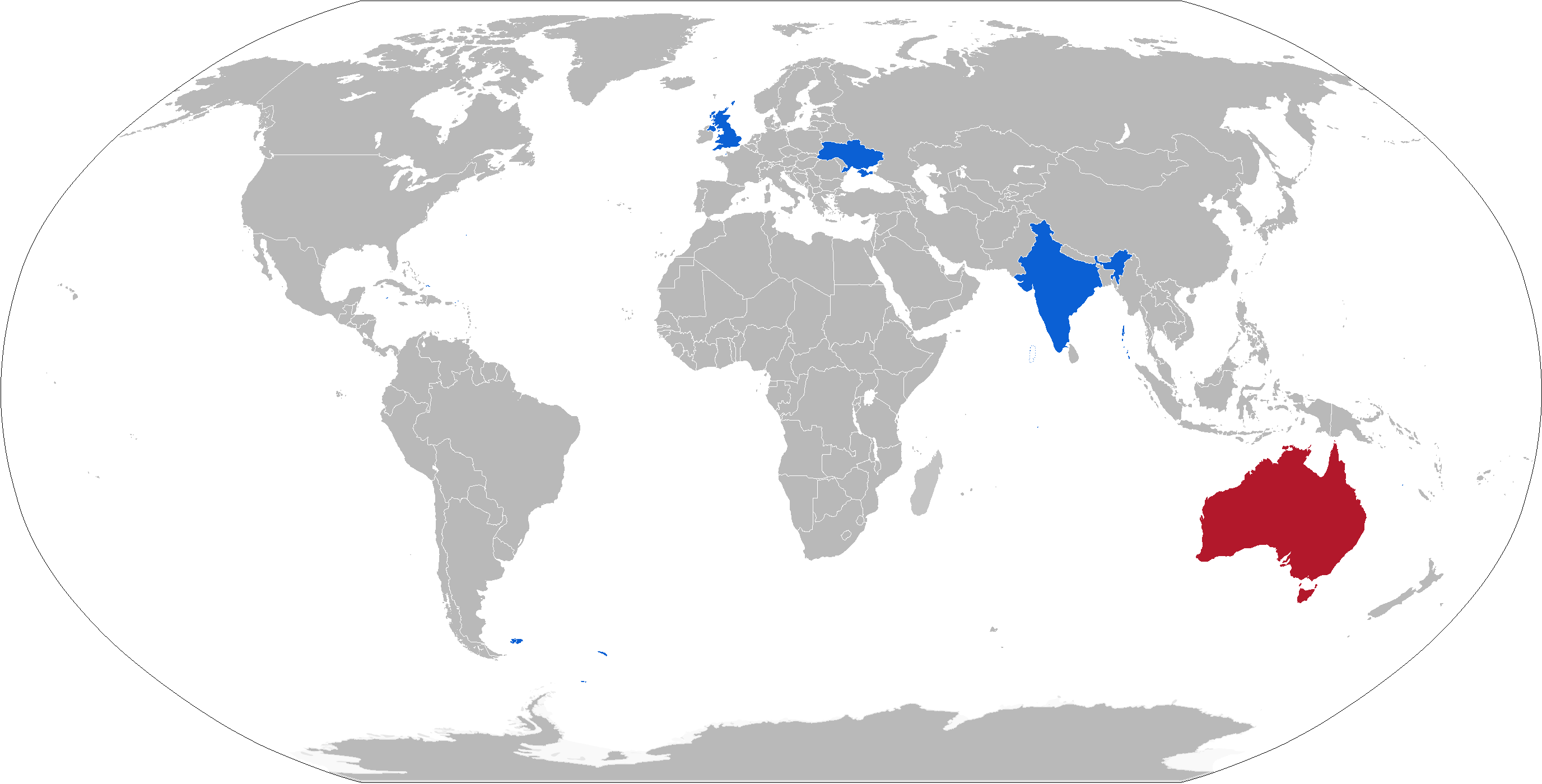
Operators Current Former

=== Current operators ===
United Kingdom

Royal Air Force / Fleet Air Arm – Equips the Typhoon and F-35B Lightning in RAF and Royal Navy service.

India

Indian Air Force – 384 ASRAAMs for SEPECAT Jaguar strike aircraft fleet.

Ukraine

Armed Forces of Ukraine – In August 2023, a surface-launched version of ASRAAM, called Raven, was reported mounted on a Supacat HMT chassis in Ukraine.

=== Future operators ===
Qatar
Qatar Air Force - Block 6 Order.
Oman
Royal Air Force of Oman - Block 6 Order.
Turkey
Turkish Air Force - Reported as being included in a weapons package alongside the 2025 Eurofighters order.

=== Former operators ===
Australia

Royal Australian Air Force – Equipped the F/A-18A/B Hornet from 2004 until the aircraft's retirement in 2021. The RAAF uses the AIM-9X with the F/A-18F, EA-18G and F-35A.

== See also ==
- A-Darter – (South Africa)
- AIM-9X – (United States)
- Bozdoğan – (Turkey) (Turkey)
- IRIS-T – (Germany, Italy, Sweden, Greece)
- MICA – (France)
- PL-10 – (China)
- Python-5 – (Israel)
- R-73 – (Soviet Union)
- SRAAM – (United Kingdom)
- List of missiles
