= AIM-82 =

US Air Force missile project

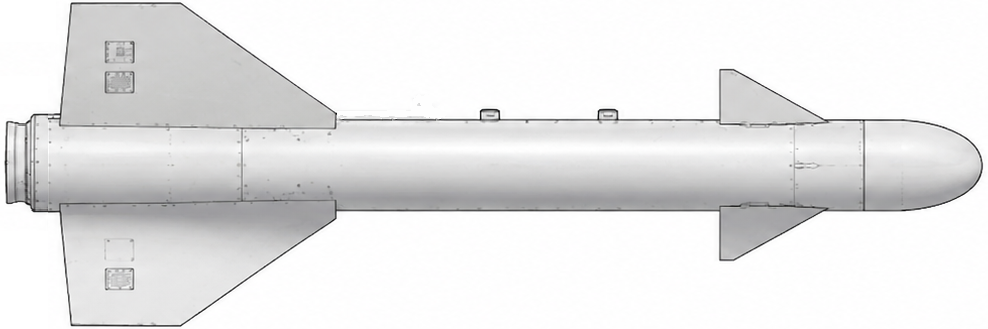
AIM-82 Sideview

AIM-82 was a missile planned by the US Air Force but cancelled before any prototypes were built. It was designed as a much more maneuverable replacement for the AIM-9 Sidewinder to give it better performance against enemy fighter aircraft in close combat. Development was cancelled in favor of joining the US Navy's similar project, the AIM-95.

== Overview ==
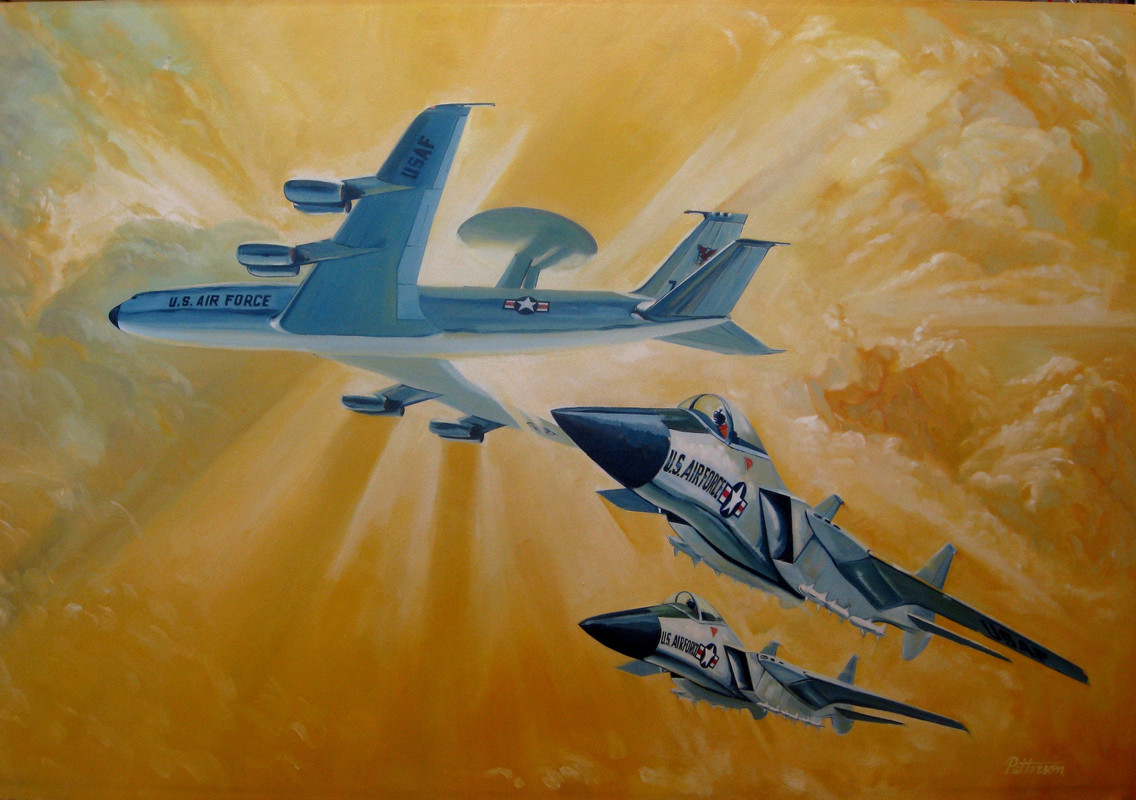
Painting of F-15's with AIM-82

In 1969 the USAF was developing the F-15 Eagle fighter. Planned as the ultimate air superiority aircraft, the F-15 was intended to be as perfect as possible in every respect. Rather than rely on the existing AIM-9 Sidewinder, it was decided to develop an entirely new short-range air-to-air missile to equip the aircraft. The AIM-82 was to be an infrared-guided, all-aspect missile, capable of locking onto the target from any angle; Sidewinders of this period could only achieve a target lock if fired from almost directly behind the target where the heat of the engines provided a large infrared signature to the missile's seeker head.

In 1970 a development contract was awarded to General Dynamics, Hughes Aircraft and Philco-Ford. Proposals were submitted later that year, but in that September the AIM-82 was canceled. The main reason was the existence of the United States Navy AIM-95 Agile program, which was developing a new short-range air-to-air missile for the F-14 Tomcat. Inter-service rivalry aside, there seemed little point in developing two missiles to perform essentially identical roles, so development on the AIM-95 was authorized. Eventually, the AIM-95 was also canceled and the AIM-9 was updated to remain in service—and indeed remains in service to this day.

== Specifications ==
The AIM-82 was canceled at a stage where the basic design had not been selected; as a result, no specifications exist for the proposed missile.

== See also ==
- List of missiles
