= Projects of DRDO =

Indian defense projects under DRDO

This article consists of projects of the Defence Research and Development Organisation (DRDO).

== Aeronautics ==
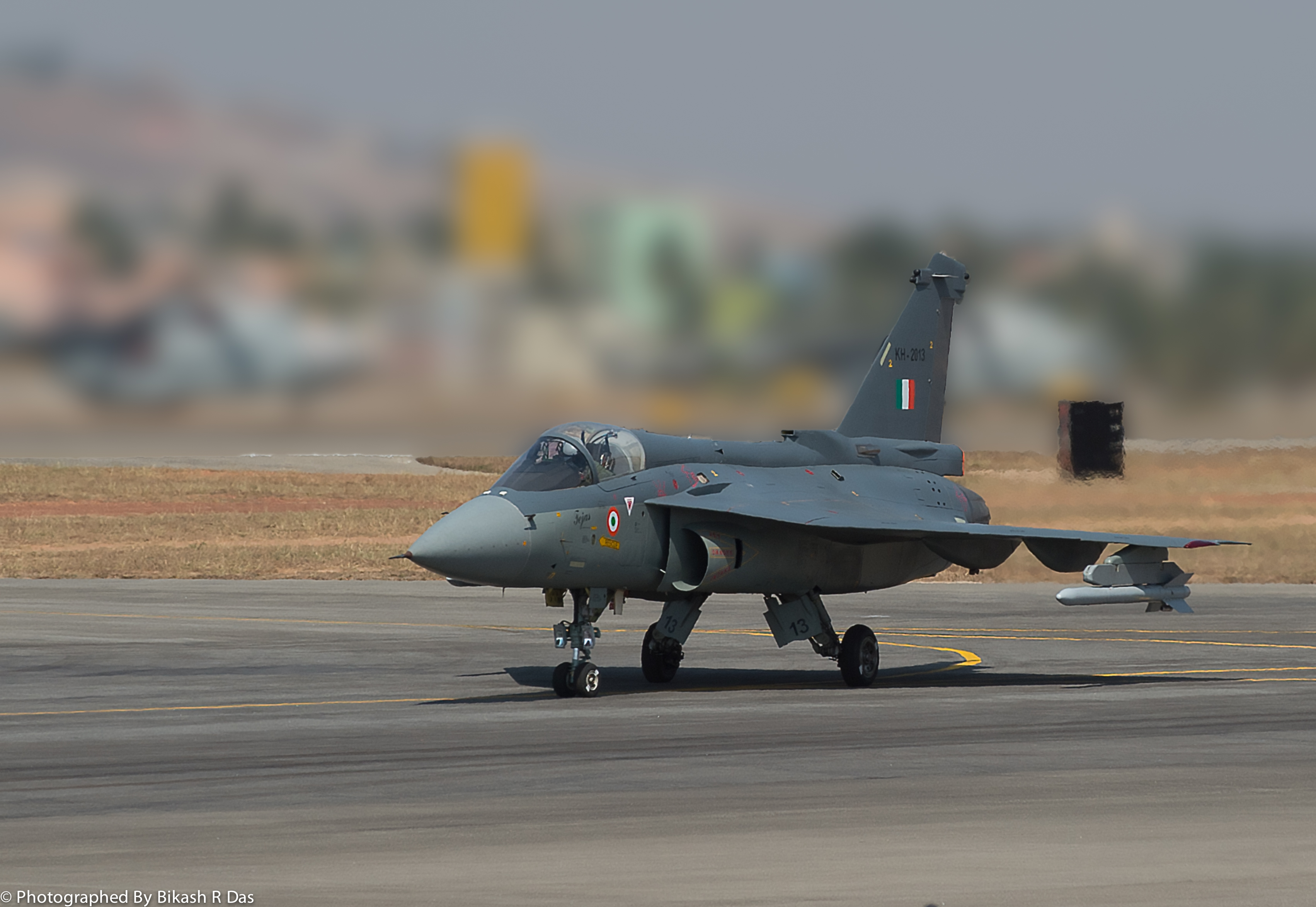
LCA Tejas at IAF induction ceremony

The Defence Research and Development Organisation (DRDO) is responsible for the ongoing HAL Tejas programme. The LCA is intended to provide the Indian Air Force with a modern, fly by wire, multi-role fighter, as well as develop the aviation industry in India. The LCA programme has allowed DRDO to progress substantially in the fields of avionics, flight control systems, aircraft propulsion and composite structures, along with aircraft design and development.

- The DRDO provided key avionics for the Sukhoi Su-30MKI programme under the "Vetrivel" programme. Systems developed by DRDO include radar warning receivers, radar and display computers. DRDO's radar computers, manufactured by HAL are also being fitted into Malaysian Su-30s.
- The DRDO is part of the Indian Air Force's upgrade programmes for its Sepecat Jaguar combat aircraft, along with the manufacturer Hindustan Aeronautics Limited. DRDO and HAL have been responsible for the system design and integration of these upgrades, which combine indigenously developed systems along with imported ones. DRDO contributed subsystems like the Tarang radar warning receiver, Tempest jammer, core avionics computers, brake parachutes, cockpit instrumentation and displays.
- HAL AMCA: Aeronautical Development Agency of DRDO is responsible for the design and development of the fifth-generation aircraft. In 2015, 700 ADA employees were working on the project along with 2,000 employees of DRDO.
- Avatar is a concept study for a robotic single-stage reusable spaceplane capable of horizontal takeoff and landing. The mission concept is for low cost military and commercial satellite space launches.

=== Fighter Aircraft Escape System ===
On 2 December 2025, DRDO completed a successful high-speed rocket-sled test of Fighter Aircraft Escape System at controlled velocity. A dual-sled system with the HAL Tejas aircraft forebody was propelled to precisely regulated velocity of 800 km/h using phased discharge of dual solid propellant rocket motors. The canopy fragilisation pattern, ejection sequence and whole aircrew recovery process was simulated using an instrumented crash test dummy, which recorded crucial loads, moments, and accelerations that would be experienced by ejected pilots. Onboard and ground-based imaging equipment recorded the entire sequence.

The Dynamic Ejection Test examined ejection seat performance, and efficacy of canopy severance mechanism in real time. The canopy severance mechanism, ejection sequencing, and full pilot recovery were confirmed by the test conducted at the Rail Track Rocket Sled Facility of Terminal Ballistics Research Laboratory. The test was undertaken in partnership with Aeronautical Development Agency, and Hindustan Aeronautics Limited. It is being developed for future aircraft, including the Tejas Mk2, AMCA, and TEDBF. In addition to giving Indian Air Force and domestic industry partners more control over integration and modifications, it will assist reduce long-term procurement costs.

=== Electronic countermeasure ===
Defence Laboratory Jodhpur in collaboration with High Energy Materials Research Laboratory developed an improved chaff material and chaff cartridge-118/I for the Indian Air Force to protect Indian military aircraft from radar jamming and deception.

=== Other Hindustan Aeronautics programmes ===
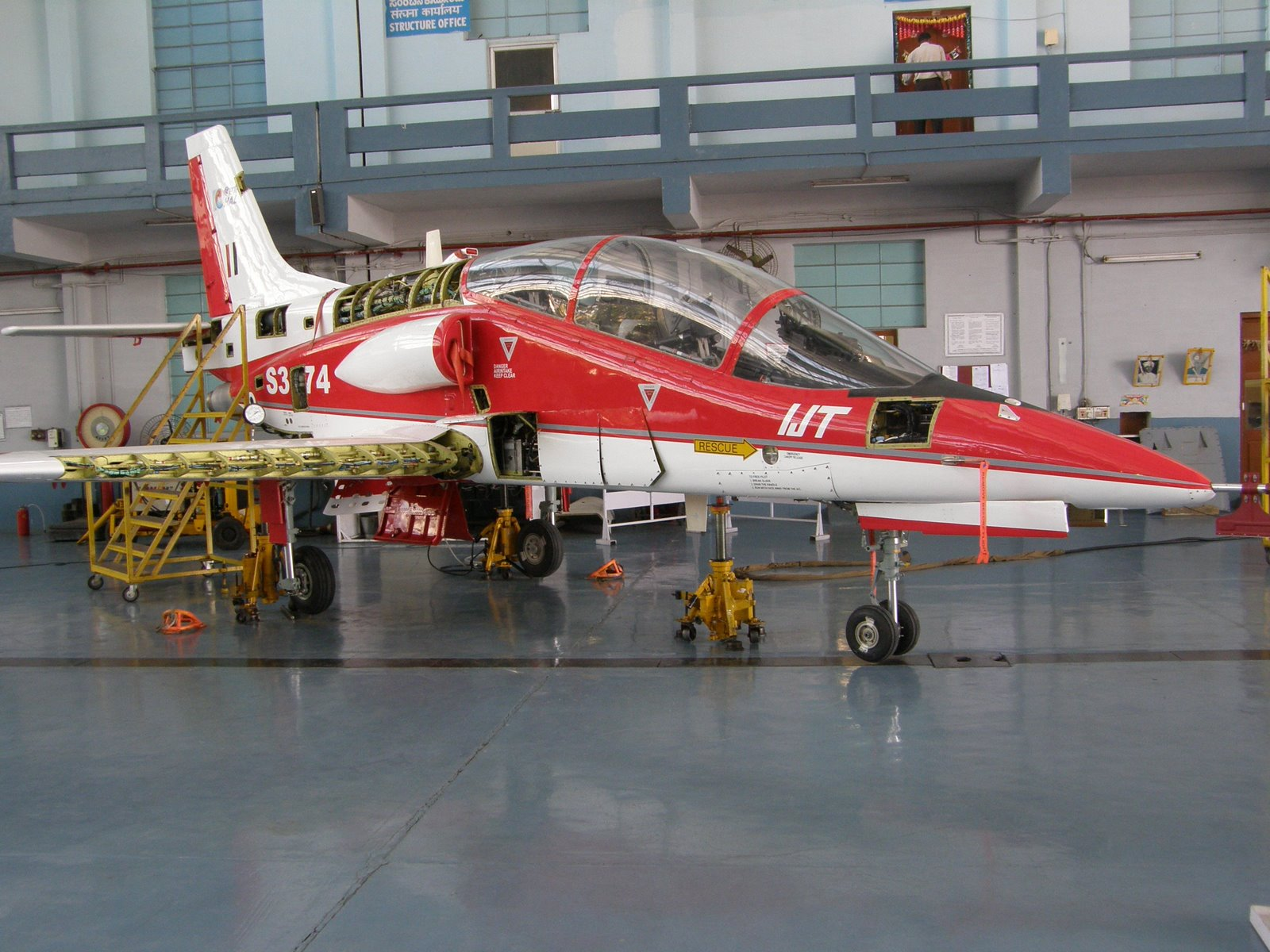
HJT-36 Intermediate Jet Trainer (IJT) prototype

Apart from the aforementioned upgrades, DRDO has also assisted Hindustan Aeronautics with its programmes. These include the HAL Dhruv helicopter and the HAL HJT-36. Over a hundred LRU (Line Replaceable Unit)'s in the HJT-36 have come directly from the LCA programme. Other duties have included assisting the Indian Air Force with indigenisation of spares and equipment. These include both mandatory as well as other items.

=== Unmanned aerial vehicles ===
The DRDO has also developed two unmanned aerial vehicles – the Nishant tactical UAV and the Lakshya (Target) Pilotless Target Aircraft (PTA). The Lakshya PTA has been ordered by all three services for their gunnery target training requirements. Efforts are on to develop the PTA further, with an improved all digital flight control system, and a better turbojet engine. The Nishant is a hydraulically launched short-ranged UAV for the tactical battle area. It is currently being evaluated by the Indian Navy and the Indian Paramilitary forces as well.

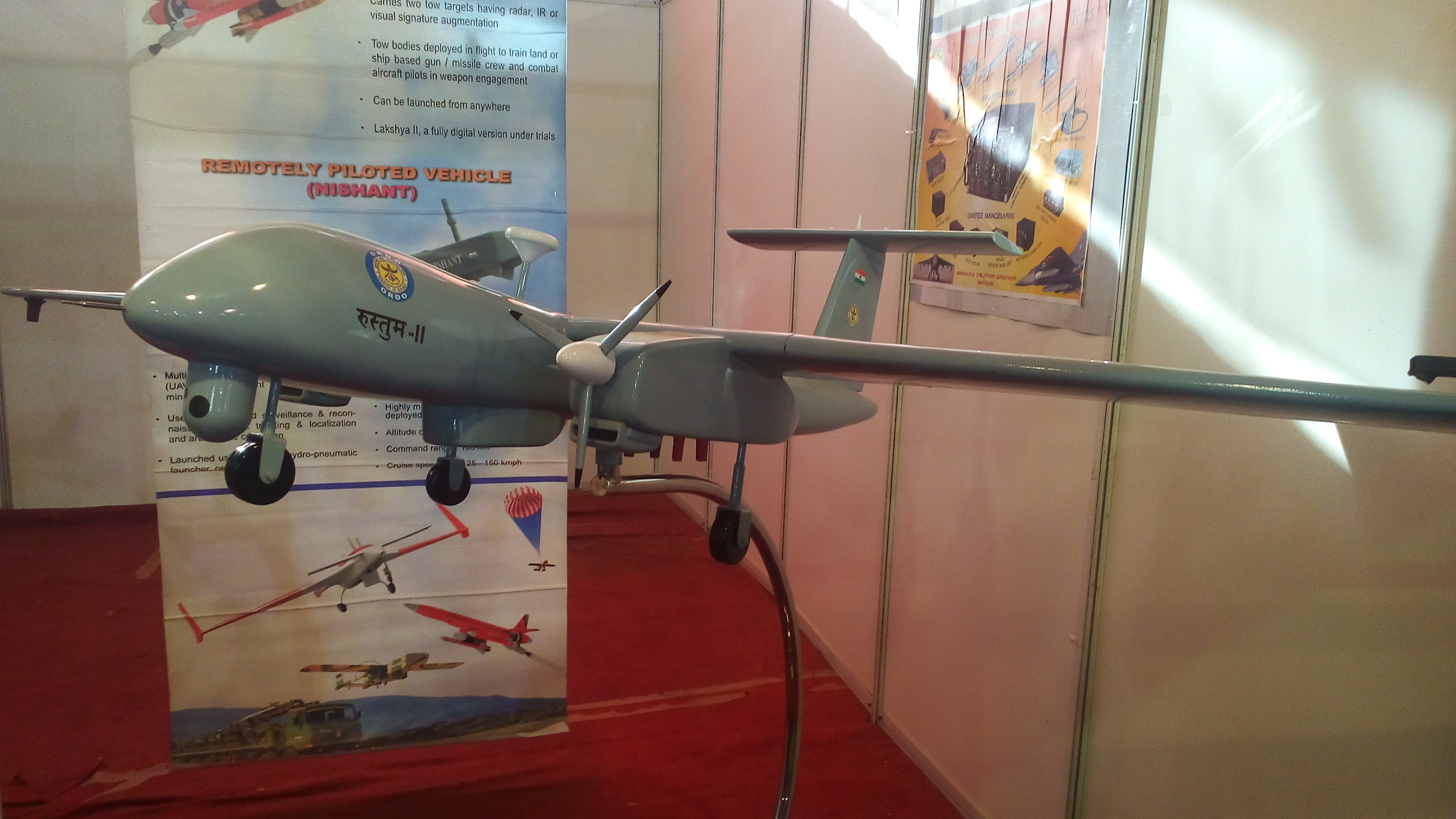
A scaled down model of TAPAS-BH-201 Model

The DRDO is also going ahead with its plans to develop a new class of UAVs. These draw upon the experience gained via the Nishant programme, and will be substantially more capable. Referred to by the HALE (High Altitude Long Endurance) and MALE (Medium Altitude Long Endurance) designations. The MALE UAV has been tentatively named the Rustom, and will feature canards and carry a range of payloads, including optronic, radar, laser designators and ESM. The UAV will have conventional landing and take off capability. The HALE UAV will have features such as SATCOM links, allowing it to be commanded beyond line of sight. Other tentative plans speak of converting the LCA into a UCAV (unmanned combat aerial vehicle), and weaponising UAVs.

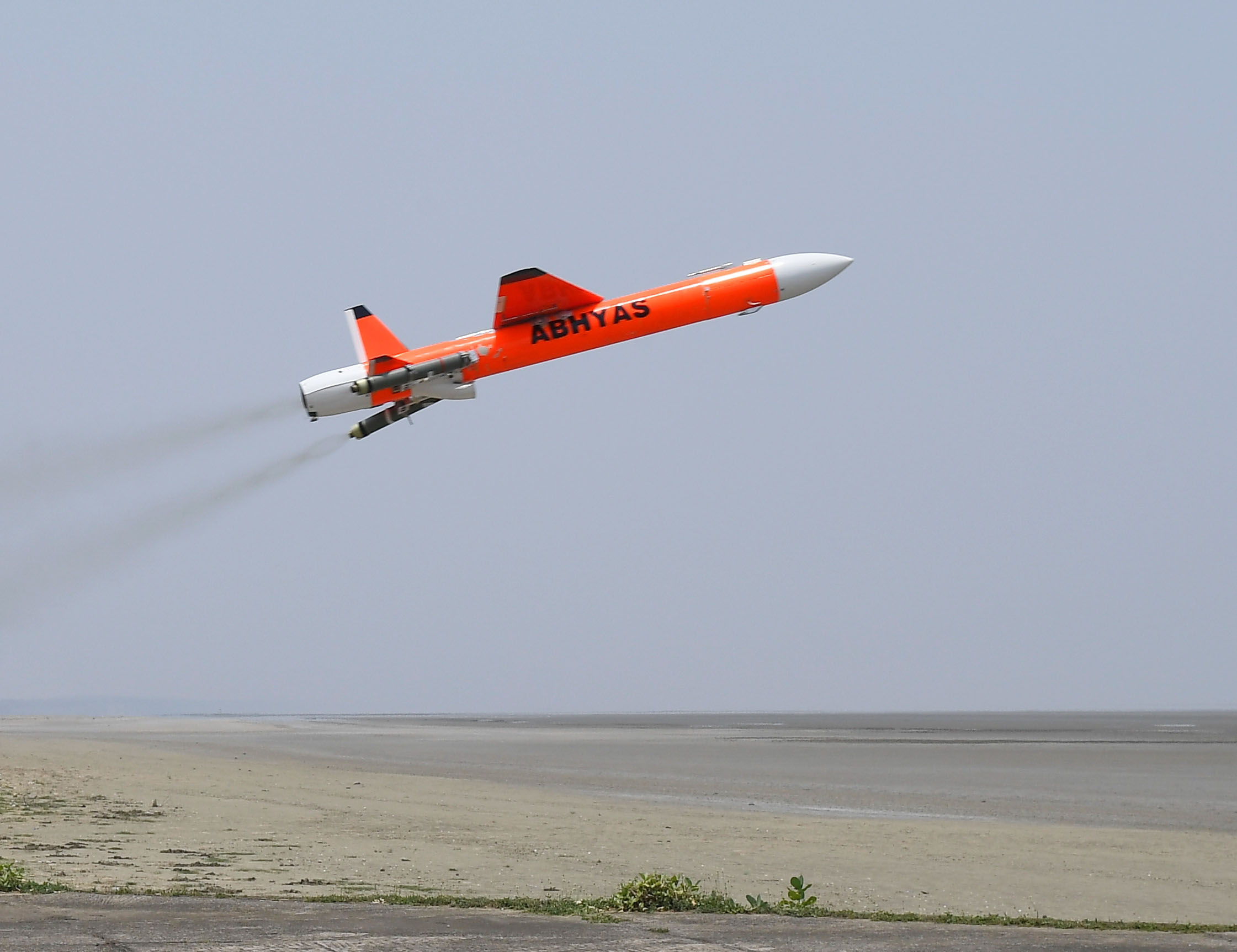
DRDO ABHYAS at Chitradurga Aeronautical Test Range.

- DRDO Abhyas
- DRDO AURA
- DRDO Bharat
- DRDO Fluffy
- DRDO Imperial Eagle
- DRDO Kapothaka
- DRDO Lakshya
- DRDO Netra
- DRDO Nishant
- Pawan UAV
- DRDO Rustom
- DRDO Ulka
- TAPAS-BH-201

==== DRDO Ghatak ====
Ghatak, previously known as Autonomous Unmanned Research Aircraft (AURA) is a stealthy unmanned combat air vehicle (UCAV) of flying-wing concept powered by dry Kaveri engine variant. It is designed and developed for the Indian Air Force (IAF) that will be capable of releasing missiles, bombs and precision-guided munitions from its internal weapons bay.

===== Stealth Wing Flying Testbed (SWiFT) =====
A precursor project under active development to test various technologies for DRDO Ghatak and future unmanned wingman bomber program.

=== Anti-drone warfare ===
==== Integrated Drone Detection & Interdiction System ====
DRDO has been developing a series of laser-based directed-energy weapons (DEW) since 2013. The Centre for High Energy Systems and Sciences (CHESS) and the Laser Science and Technology Centre (LASTEC) are two of the developing agencies of the DRDO project. DRDO's first such weapon, belonging to a 1 kW class, was tested in 2017. Thereafter, multiple developments have been undertaken with progressive variants under Integrated Drone Detection & Interdiction System (IDD&IS). The variants named Mk-I, Mk-II and Mk-IIA has a power output capacity of 2 kW, 10–12 kW and 30 kW and a range of 1 km (0.62 mi), 2 km (1.2 mi) and 5 km (3.1 mi), respectively. The latest variant, Mk-IIA, also called Sahastra Shakti, was tested successfully on 13 April 2025. As of then, DRDO is also developing laser-DEW systems of a 50–100 kW range along with microwave-based DEW under its revised short, medium and long-term goals.

In March 2024, the Indian Army's Corps of Army Air Defence had inducted the first lot of seven IDD&IS into service. India has reportedly placed an order for 23 such systems for ₹400 crore (equivalent to ₹426 crore or US$46 million in 2026). Further nine were to be ordered as of April 2025. Earlier, during the same month, it was reported that the Indian Army's IDD&IS Mk 1 had intercepted a Chinese origin, Pakistan Army-operated drone in the area of responsibility of the XVI Corps, southwards of the Pir Panjal Range.

On 29 December 2025, the Defence Acquisition Council, functioning under the Ministry of Defence and the chairmanship of the defence minister, Rajnath Singh, cleared the procurement of IDD&IS Mk-II for the Indian Army. Earlier, reports in November 2025, indicated Indian Army and Indian Air Force's bid to initially induct 16 IDD&IS Mk-II systems.

==== High-Power Microwave system ====
The project to develop a microwave-based DEW for counter-UAS (C-UAS) roles commenced in 2019 and the development was underway as of April 2025.

DRDO's Bengaluru-based Microwave Tube Research and Development Centre (MTRDC) unveiled a model of its High-Power Microwave (HPM) system during the 2026 International Conference on Electronic Warfare (EWCI) organised by the India chapter of the Association of Old Crows (AOC). The conference was held between 20 and 22 January. The prototype is reportedly in trials and testing phase during which the system has already disabled a small quadcopter, commercial, DJI Phantom-class UAVs up to a range of 1 km (0.62 mi). The goal of maximum range for the existing versi

on is 5 km (3.1 mi). The testing phase is expected to conclude by June 2026. The HPM system operates in the S-band frequency. The maximum power output is 450 MW (600,000 hp) with a pulse width of 20 ns (0.020 μs) and single-shot pulse repetition frequency of 50 Hz or 500 Hz.

In early September 2026, reports reviled that DRDO launched the SHIELD programme under the Technology Development Fund (TDF) scheme by releasing the Request for Proposal (RfP) for the development. The SHIELD is an acronym for S-band, High-Power Microwave (HPM) Integrated Evaluation System for Lethality & Damage. The programme is meant to analyse the reaction of different electronic systems to powerful microwave attacks, specifically S-band HPM. By the details from the RfP, the system is expected to generate a peak electric field strength of at least 3 kV/m in the far field. SHIELD will employ Gallium Nitride (GaN)-based solid-state power amplifier (SSPA) technology and will be capable of operating in multiple pulse modes and adjustable duty cycles with advanced thermal management. The system could also be mounted on drones.

==== BEDHAK system ====
In November 2026, the Microwave Tube Research and Development Centre (MTRDC) issued an expression of interest (EoI) to the Indian industry to co-develop a high-power radio-frequency directed energy weapon under Project BEDHAK. The selected vendor is expected to work alongside DRDO in the final stages of realisation, integration, testing and field trials of the prototype under the programme. This will also develop capacity for serial production of the system later. The BEDHAK will include a compact prime power source, high-voltage pulsed power conditioning, a microwave source such as a magnetron or vircator, and a directional antenna capable of focusing energy on a target at distance.

=== Indigenisation efforts ===
DRDO has been responsible for the indigenisation of key defence stores and equipment. DRDO has assisted Hindustan Aeronautics Limited and the IAF with the indigenisation of spares and assemblies for several aircraft. DRDO laboratories have worked in coordination with academic institutes, the CSIR and even ISRO over projects required for the Indian Air Force and its sister services. DRDO's infrastructure is also utilised by other research organisations in India. In the first ever initiative of its kind, DRDO has provided its patented Copper-Titanium (CuTi) alloy technology for commercial exploitation to a start-up company. The agreement between DRDO and Pahwa Metal Tech Pvt Ltd was signed on the sidelines of the Start Up India event at Delhi.

== Armaments ==
DRDO cooperates with the state-owned Public Sector Undertakings for producing its items. These have led to issues of marginal quality control for some items, and time-consuming rectification. Whilst these are common to the introduction of most new weapons systems, the OFB has had issues with maintaining the requisite schedule and quality of manufacture owing to their own structural problems and lack of modernisation. The DRDO has played a vital role in the development of this ability since the role of private organisations in the development of small arms and similar items has been limited. A significant point in case is the INSAS rifle which has been adopted by the Indian Army as its standard battle rifle and is in extensive service. There have been issues with rifle quality in use under extreme conditions in the heat, with the OFB stating that it will rectify these troubles with higher grade material and strengthening the unit. Prior troubles were also dealt with in a similar manner. In the meantime, the rifle has found favour throughout the army and has been ordered in number by other paramilitary units and police forces.

In recent years, India's booming economy has allowed the OFB to modernise with more state funding coming its way, to the tune of US$400 million invested during 2002–07. The organisation hopes that this will allow it to modernise its infrastructure; it has also begun introducing new items, including a variant of the AK-47 rifles.

The DRDO's various projects are:

=== Body armour ===
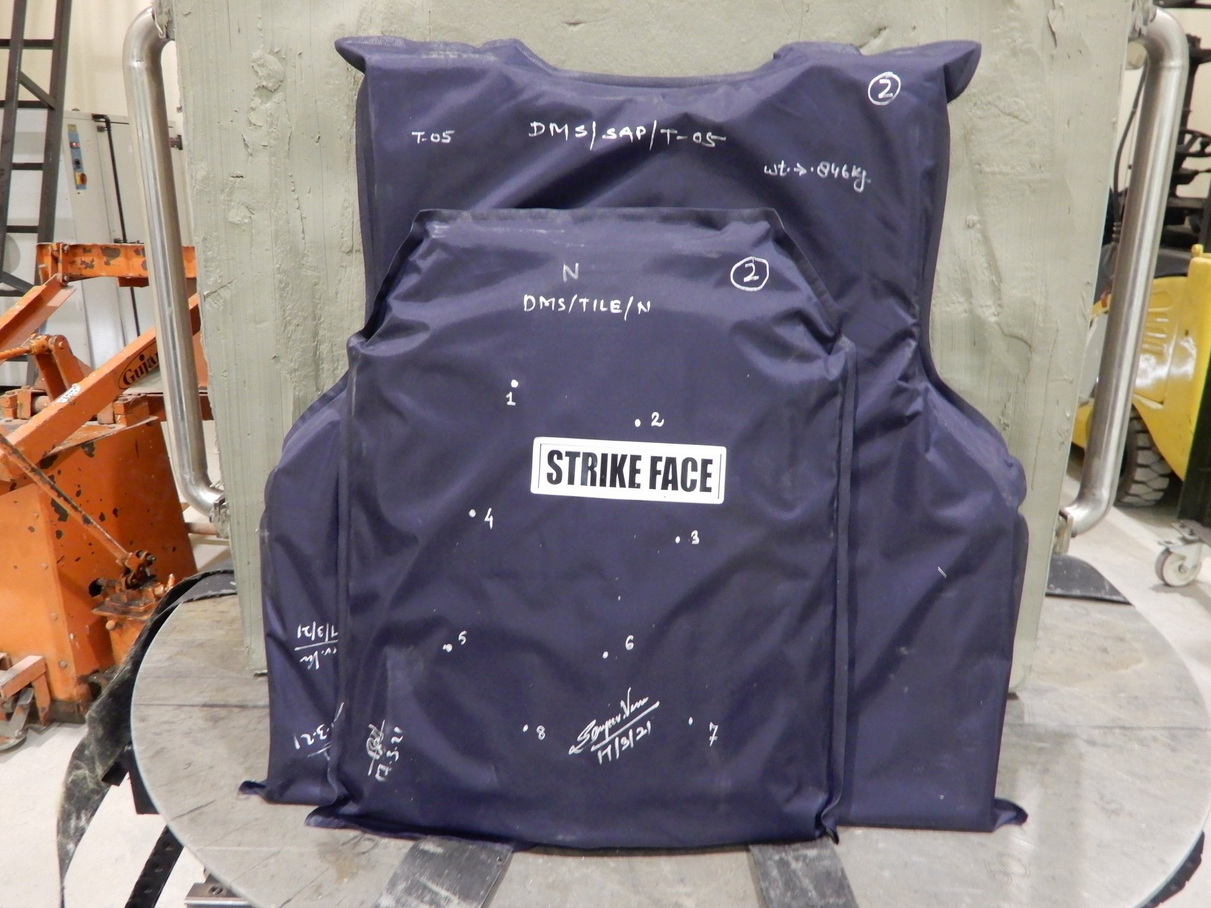
Bulletproof vest

Due to use of tungsten carbide armor-piercing bullet by banned terror groups like Jaish-e-Mohammed (JeM), Defence Materials and Stores Research and Development Establishment (DMSRDE) developed a new medium-sized light weight 9 kg bulletproof vest for the Indian Army in 2021 for counter insurgency operation with increasing protection level. The bulletproof vest conforms to Bureau of Indian Standards (BIS) and the Front Hard Armour Panel (FHAP) was validated by Terminal Ballistics Research Laboratory (TBRL).

==== DMSRDE Bullet Proof Jacket (BIS Threat Level 6) ====
The lightest bulletproof vest designed to withstand 7.62×54mmR API (level 6 of BIS 17051) ammunition has been created by DMSRDE. It passed the BIS 17051-2018 standard testing at Terminal Ballistics Research Laboratory. One of the jacket's most notable features is the front Hard Armour Panel (HAP), which can survive multiple impacts (up to six shots) with 7.62 x 54 R API (Sniper rounds) in both ICW (in conjunction with) and standalone designs. Its monolithic ceramic plate front HAP, with polymer backing, is ergonomically designed. In addition to improving wearability and comfort during operations, this guarantees optimal protection. ICW hard armour panels (HAPs) and standalone HAPs have respective areal densities of less than 40 kg/m2 and 43 kg/m2.

==== ABHED jackets ====
DRDO Industry Academia Centre of Excellence at IIT Delhi has developed two varieties of ABHED (Advanced Ballistics for High Energy Defeat) bulletproof jackets. They are lighter than the Army's maximum weight requirement and are able to mitigate the highest threat levels. Polymers and boron carbide were used to make these jackets. The design configuration is based on the characterization of several materials at high strain rates, followed by appropriate modelling and simulation. The protocols have been followed, and the armour plates for the jackets have successfully completed all development trials. Modular configurations and 360-degree protection with a 3,400 square centimeters total protection area are the standout features of these jackets. It is made up of rigid Hard Armour Panels, flexible Soft Armour Panels, and an ergonomic carrier for security personnel to hold both panels. The 8 kg BIS level 5 jackets offer defense against 7.62×51mm NATO rounds as well as armor-piercing and Mild Steel Core bullets. BIS level 6 jackets, weighing 9.3 kg, offer protection against sniper shots with less than 25 mm, as well as against 7.62×39mm.

==== Clothing ====
Defence Institute of Physiology and Allied Sciences (DIPAS) developed triple layer modular extreme weather waterproof clothing for the Indian Armed Forces weighing under 4.5 kg. The insulation can provide body protection up to minus 50 degree Celsius at 30,000 feet with around wind velocity of 60 km per hour preventing hypothermia and minimising the risks of frostbite.

=== Small arms ===
- The INSAS weapon system has become the standard battle rifle for the Indian Army and paramilitary units. Bulk production of a LMG variant commenced in 1998. It has since been selected as the standard assault rifle of the Royal Army of Oman.
- In 2010, DRDO completed the development of Oleo-resin plastic hand grenades as a less lethal way to control rioters, better tear gas shells and short-range laser dazzlers.
- Modern Sub Machine Carbine (MSMC) also called Joint Venture Protective Carbine (JVPC) is designed by the Armament Research and Development Establishment (ARDE) of DRDO and manufactured by the Ordnance Factory Board at Small Arms Factory, Kanpur and the Ordnance Factory Tiruchirappalli.
- ARDE and private sector partner Dvipa Armour India collaborated to produce Ugram, a battle rifle of 7.62x51mm calibre. Weighs less than 4 kg, the maximum length of the rifle is 1,000 mm and has an effective range of 500 meters. It has a 20-round magazine and can fire 600 rounds per minute in single and full auto modes. The gas-operated rotating bolt rifle has the option of having iron and reflex sights. Its upper and lower bodies are machined and has rivet-free construction with adjustable telescopic butt.
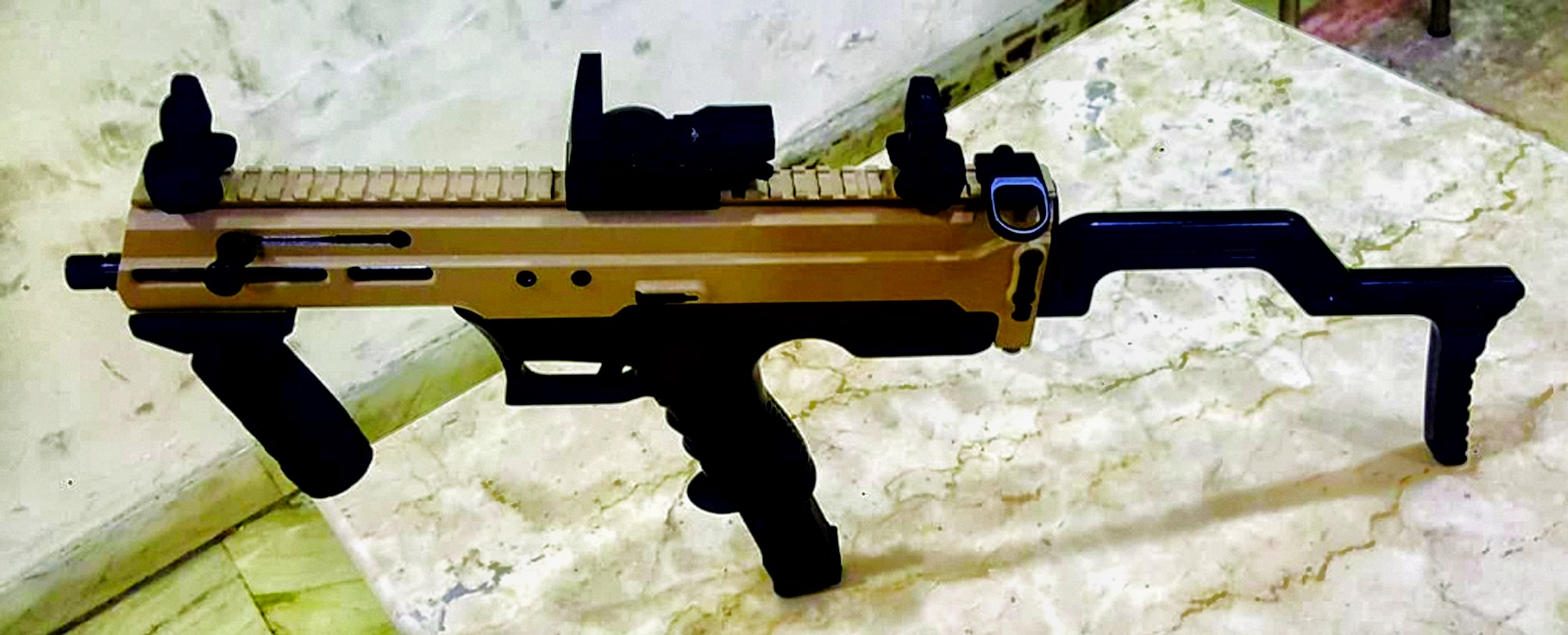
ASMI

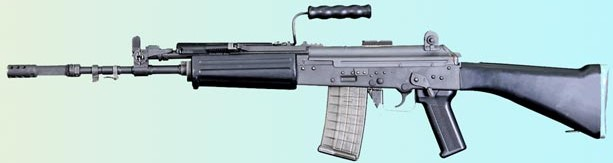
INSAS rifle

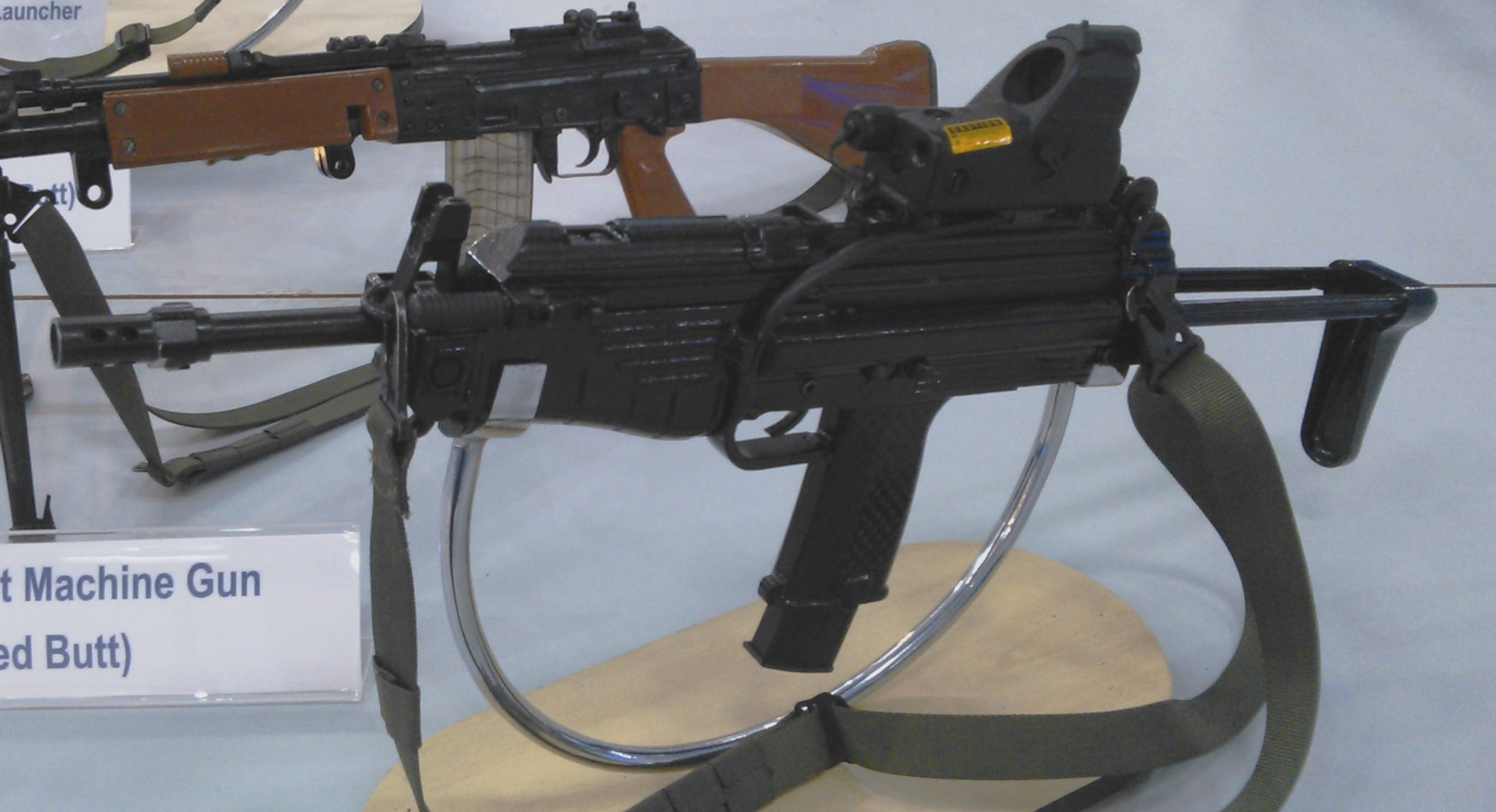
Modern Sub Machine Carbine

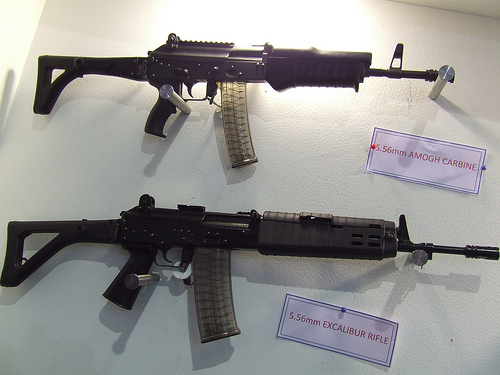
Amogh carbine (top) and Excalibur (bottom)

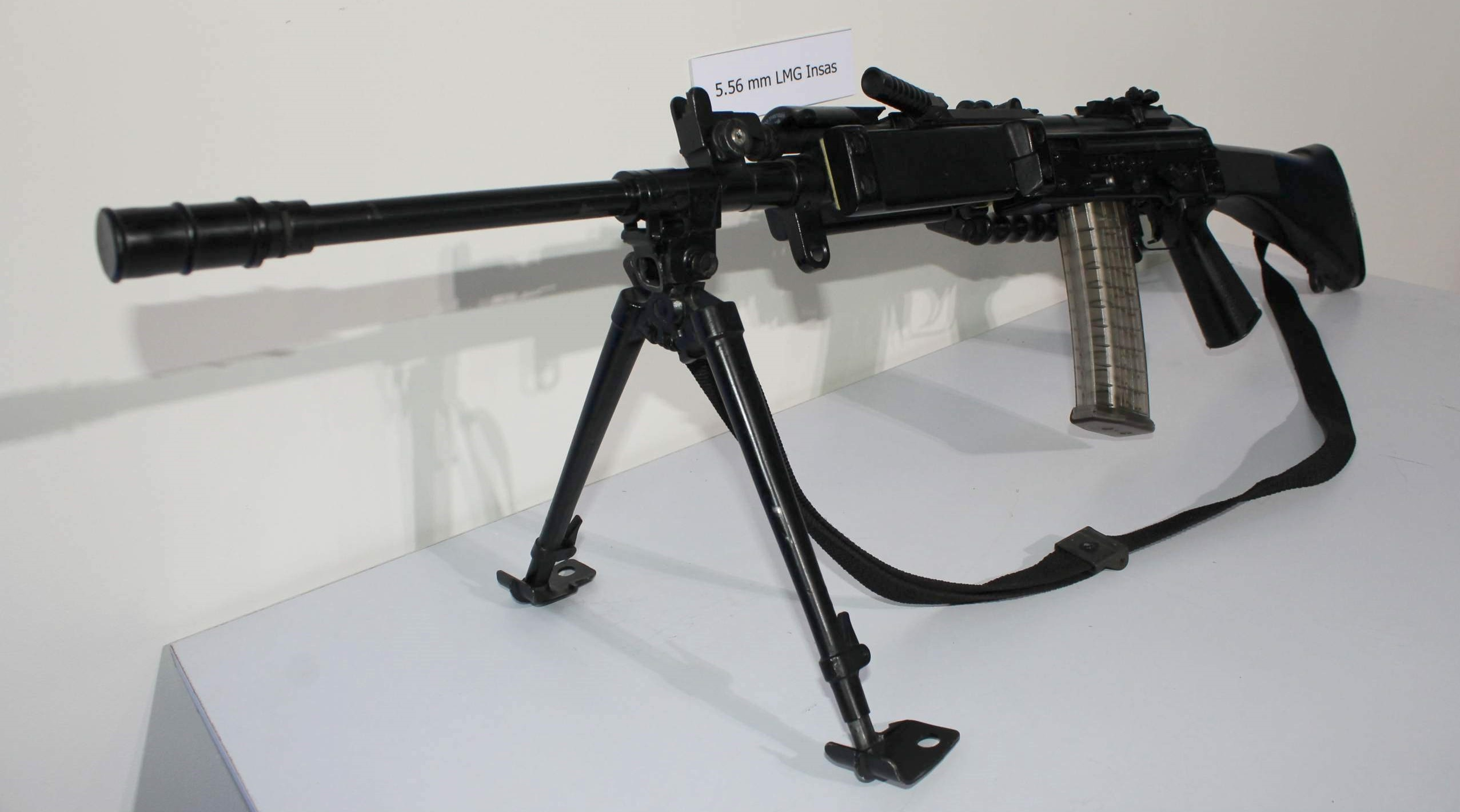
INSAS Light Machine Gun (LMG)

=== Man-portable ATGM launcher ===
DRDO has developed an indigenous 84 mm calibre, 7 kg lightweight recoilless reusable ATGM launcher for the Indian army which will replace the 14 kg Carl Gustav Mark-II launcher. The DRDO has made extensive use of composites in its construction, resulting in the reduced weight.

=== Explosives ===
==== Chemical Kit for Detection of Explosives (CKDE) ====
A compact, low-cost and handy explosive detection kit has been designed and perfected for field detection of traces of explosives. The kit yields a colour reaction, based on which explosives can be detected in minutes. It is used for identification of all common military, civil and home-made explosive compositions, and is being used by Police and BSF for the detection of explosives.

==== Explosive Detection Kit (EDK) ====
In what has been termed a "reverse technology transfer", the Explosive Detection Kit widely used in India by bomb detection squads and the armed forces since 2002, would be manufactured and sold in the US. The kit uses reagents to detect various chemicals present in explosives.

===== RaIDer-X =====
High Energy Materials Research Laboratory (HEMRL) of DRDO in collaboration with Indian Institute of Science (IISc), Bengaluru and Indian Institute of Science Education and Research, Bhopal (IISER-B) have developed a new explosive detection device called RaIDer-X (Rapid Identification Detector of eXplosives) which was showcased on 1 March 2020 during National Workshop on Explosive Detection (NWED-2020). It can detect bulk of pure as well as contaminated explosives of 20 different kinds from a standoff distance of 2 metre by using Universal Multiple Angle Raman Spectroscopy (UMARS) technique.

==== Indian CL-20 explosive ====
A new high explosive is in the making at a DRDO lab that could replace other standard explosives of the armed forces such as RDX, HMX, FOX-7 and Amorphous Boron. Scientists at the Pune-based High Energy Materials Research Laboratory (HEMRL) have already synthesized an adequate quantity of the new explosive CL-20, in their laboratory. The compound, 'Indian CL-20' or 'ICL-20', was indigenously developed in HEMRL using inverse technology. CL-20 is a Nitroamine class of explosive which is 20% more powerful than HMX which itself is more than potent RDX. CL-20-based shaped charges significantly improve the penetration of armour and could potentially be used in projectiles for the 120-mm Arjun tank main gun. The CL-20, due to its reduced sensitivity, enables easy handling and transportation which reduces the chances of mishap and loss of men, money, materials and machines.

=== Artillery systems and ammunition ===
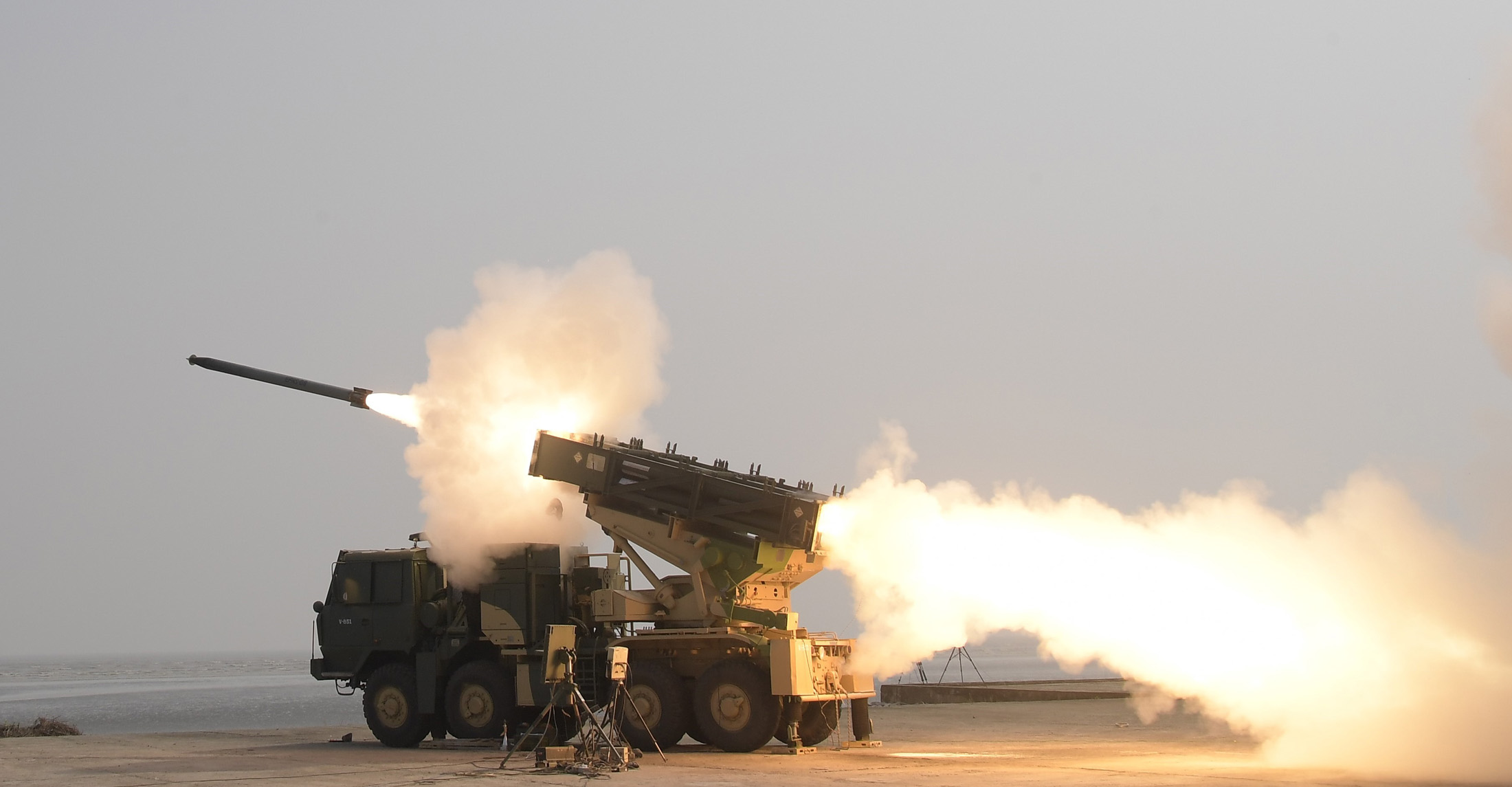
Pinaka rocket tested on 4 November 2020

- Pinaka multi-barrel rocket launcher: This system has seen significant success. This system saw the DRDO cooperate extensively with the privately owned industrial sector in India. As of 2016, the Pinaka Mk1 system, with rockets of up to 40 km striking distance, has been successfully inducted in the Indian Army, with two regiments in service and two more on order. The Pinaka Mk2 program with rockets of up to 60 km in range, has cleared trials and has been recommended for induction as well.
- A new long-range tactical rocket system is being developed, referred to as the Prahaar (with the name meaning "Strike", in Hindi) program, while an exportable derivative named Pragati ("Progress" in Hindi) was displayed in a South Korean arms fair. The DRDO's project has fielded a long-range tactical strike system, deriving from the successful Pinaka project. The aim is to develop a long-range system able to strike at a range of 100–120 km, with each rocket in the system, having a payload of up to 250 kg. The new MBRS's rocket will have a maximum speed of 4.7 mach and will rise to an altitude of 40 km, before hitting its target at 1.8 mach. There is also a move to put a sophisticated new inertial guidance system on the rockets whilst keeping cost constraints in mind. The DRDO has evaluated the IMI-Elisra developed trajectory control system and its technology, for use with the Pinaka, and a further development of the system could presumably be used with the new MBRL as well.
- DRDO's ARDE developed 81 mm and the, 120 mm illuminating bombs and 105 mm illuminating shells for the Indian Army's infantry and Artillery.
- A 51 mm Lightweight Infantry Platoon Mortar for the Indian Army. A man portable weapon, the 51 mm mortar achieves double the range of 2-inch (51 mm) mortar without any increase in weight. Its new HE bomb uses pre fragmentation technology to achieve improved lethality. Besides HE, a family of ammunition consisting of smoke, illuminating and practice bombs has also been developed. The weapon system is under production at Ordnance Factories.
- Proximity fuses for missiles and artillery shells. Proximity fuses are used with artillery shells for "air bursts" against entrenched troops and in anti-aircraft and anti-missile roles as well.
- Training devices: These include a mortar training device for the 81 mm mortar used by the infantry, a mortar training device for the 120 mm mortar used by the artillery, and a 0.50-inch (13 mm) sub-calibre training device for 105 mm Vijayanta tank gun.
- The Indian Field Gun, a 105 mm field gun was developed for the Indian Army and is in production. This was a significant challenge for the OFB, and various issues were faced with its manufacture including reliability issues and metallurgical problems. These were rectified over time.
- Submerged Signal Ejector cartridges (SSE), limpet mines, short-range anti-submarine rockets (with HE and practice warheads), the Indian Sea Mine which can be deployed against both ships and submarines. The DRDO also designed short- and medium-range ECM rockets which deploy chaff to decoy away anti-ship homing missiles. In a similar vein, they also developed a 3 in (76.2 mm) PFHE shell, pre-fragmented and with a proximity fuse, for use against anti-ship missiles and other targets, by the Navy. All these items are in production.
- For the Indian Air Force, DRDO has developed Retarder Tail Units and fuze systems for the 450 kg bomb used by strike aircraft, 68 mm "Arrow" rockets (HE, Practice and HEAT) for rocket pods used in air-to-ground and even air-to-air (if need be), a 450 kg high-speed, low-drag (HSLD) bomb and practice bombs (which mimic different projectiles with the addition of suitable drag plates) and escape aid cartridges for Air Force aircraft. All these items are in production.

=== Tank armament ===
DRDO's ARDE also developed other critical systems, such as the Arjun Main Battle Tank's 120 mm rifled main gun and is presently engaged in the development of the armament for the Future IFV, the "Abhay". The DRDO is also a member of the trials teams for the T-72 upgrade and its fire control systems. Earlier on, the DRDO also upgraded the Vijayanta medium tank with new fire control computers.

== Electronics and computer sciences ==
=== Electronic warfare ===
ECM stations for both communication and non-com (radar etc.) systems. The Indian Army has ordered its Signal Corps to be a prime contributor in the design and development stage, along with the DRDO's DLRL. The scale of this venture is substantial – it comprises COMINT and Electronic intelligence stations which can monitor and jam different bands for both voice/data as well as radar transmissions. In contrast to other such systems, Samyukta is an integrated system, which can perform the most critical battlefield EW tasks in both COM and Non-COM roles. The system will be the first of its type in terms of its magnitude and capability in the Army. Its individual modules can also be operated independently. A follow on system known as Sauhard is under development.

- The Safari IED suppression system for the army and paramilitary forces and the Sujav ESM system meant for high accuracy direction finding and jamming of communication transceivers.
- Samyukta Electronic Warfare System
- E-bomb : DRDO is developing electromagnetic pulse (EMP) device that can be dropped using satellite guidance. Research Centre Imarat (RCI) is the leading laboratory behind the project.

==== EW systems for the Air Force ====
- Radar warning receivers for the Indian Air Force of the Tarang series. These have been selected to upgrade most of the Indian Air Force's aircraft such as for the MiG-21, MiG-29, Su-30 MKI, MiG-27 and Jaguar as well as self-protection upgrades for the transport fleet.
- The Tranquil RWR for MiG-23s (superseded by the Tarang project) and the Tempest jamming system for the Air Force's MiG's. The latest variant of the Tempest jamming system is capable of noise, barrage, as well as deception jamming as it makes use of DRFM. The DRDO has also developed a High Accuracy Direction Finding system (HADF) for the Indian Air Force's Su-30 MKIs which are fitted in the modular "Siva" pod capable of supersonic carriage. This HADF pod is meant to cue Kh-31 Anti radiation missiles used by the Su-30 MKI for SEAD.
- DRDO stated in 2009 that its latest Radar warning receiver for the Indian Air Force, the R118, had gone into production. The R118 can also fuse data from different sensors such as the aircraft radar, missile/laser warning systems and present the unified data on a multi-function display. The DRDO also noted that its new Radar Warner Jammer systems (RWJ) were at an advanced stage of development and would be submitted for trials. The RWJ is capable of detecting all foreseen threats and jamming multiple targets simultaneously.
- Other EW projects revealed by the DRDO include the MAWS project (a joint venture by the DRDO and EADS) which leverages EADS hardware and DRDO software to develop MAWS systems for transport, helicopter and fighter fleets. DRDO also has laser warning systems available.
- A DIRCM (Directed Infra Red Countermeasures) project to field a worldclass DIRCM system intended to protect aircraft from infrared guided weapons.
- The DRDO is also developing an all new ESM project in cooperation with the Indian Air Force's Signals Intelligence Directorate, under the name of "Divya Drishti" (Divine Sight). Divya Drishti will field a range of static as well as mobile ESM stations that can "fingerprint" and track multiple airborne targets for mission analysis purposes. The system will be able to intercept a range of radio frequency emissions like radar, navigational, communication or electronic countermeasure signals. The various components of the project will be networked via SATCOM links.
- Additional DRDO EW projects delivered to the Indian Air Force have included the COIN A and COIN B SIGINT stations. DRDO and BEL developed ELINT equipment for the Indian Air Force, installed on the service's Boeing 737s and Hawker Siddeley Avro aircraft. DRDO has also developed a Radar Fingerprinting System for the IAF and the Navy.
- Another high accuracy ESM system is being developed by the DRDO for the AEW&C project. The Indian Air Force's AEW&C systems will also include a comprehensive ESM suite, capable of picking up both radars as well as conducting Communications Intelligence.

=== Radars ===
The DRDO has steadily increased its radar development. The result has been substantial progress in India's ability to design and manufacture high power radar systems with locally sourced components and systems. This began with the development of short-range 2D systems (Indra-1) and has now extended to high power 3D systems like LRTR intended for strategic purposes. Several other projects span the gamut of radar applications, from airborne surveillance (AEW&C) to firecontrol radars (land based and airborne). A list of the tactical programs is as follows:

==== Army ====
- Multifunction Phased Array Radar and 3D Surveillance Radar for Akash Missile Weapon System (Rajendra & 3D CAR respectively). In production.
- Low Level Light weight 2D Radar for mountainous terrain Air Defence (Bharani). In production.
- Low Level Light weight 3D Radar for mountainous terrain Air Defence (Bharani Mk2). In production.
- 3D Tactical Control Radar for Air Defence (3D TCR). In production.
- 4D Active Aperture Array Tactical Control Radar for Air Defence (4D TCR). In development.
- Short Range Battle Field Surveillance Radar (2D BFSR-SR). In production.
- Weapon Locating Radar (3D WLR). In production.
- 3D Atulya ADFCR (Air Defense Fire Control Radar). In development.
- Multi Mission Radar (MMSR). Project cancelled and subsumed into QRSAM (Quick Reaction SAM) program.
- FOPEN Radar. In development.
- Through wall detection Radar. In development.
- Ground Penetration Radar. In development.

==== Air Force ====
- Multifunction Phased Array Radar and 3D Surveillance Radar for Akash Missile Weapon System (Rajendra and 3D CAR respectively). In production.
- Active Phased Array Radar for AEW&C. In production.
- Low level 2D Air Defence Radar (Indra-2). Production closed and items delivered.
- 3D Low Level Light Weight Radar (Aslesha). In production.
- 3D Low Level Light Weight Radar for Mountains (Aslesha Mk2). In development.
- 3D Medium Range Surveillance Radar for Air Defence (Rohini derivative of 3D CAR)
- 4D Active Array Medium Power radar for AD role (Arudhra). In production.
- 4D Active Array Low Level Transportable radar for AD role (Ashwini). In production.
- 4D Active Array High Power radar for AD role. In development.
- 4D Active Array for AWACS India project. In development.
- 3D Active Array Multi Function Radar for BMD role (MFCR). In production.
- 3D Active Array Long Range Tracking Radar (LRTR) for BMD role. In production.
- 4D Active Array Very Long Range Tracking radar for BMD role (VLRTR). In development.
- Airborne Electronically Scanned Array Radar for Tejas Mark 1A and Tejas Mk2 (Uttam). In development.
- Ground Controlled interception
- SAR for UAVs

==== Navy ====
- Maritime Patrol Radar for fixed and Rotary Wing Aircraft (superseded by a more advanced system, the XV-2004)
- Maritime Patrol Radar with RS and ISAR (XV-2004)
- 3D Medium-Range Surveillance Radar for ASW Corvettes. In production.
- Multifunction Phased Array Radar for Air Defence Ship. In development.
- Maritime Patrol Airborne Radar for UAV. In development.
- Coastal Surveillance Radar (CSR). In production.

More details on the DRDO's productions as well as production-ready radar systems is as follows:

- INDRA series of 2D radars meant for Army and Air Force use. This was the first high power radar developed by the DRDO, with the Indra-I radar for the Indian Army, followed by Indra Pulse Compression (PC) version for the Indian Air Force, also known as the Indra-II, which is a low level radar to search and track low flying cruise missiles, helicopters and aircraft. These are 2D radars that provide range and azimuth information and are meant to be used as gap fillers. The Indra 2 PC has pulse compression providing improved range resolution. The series is used both by the Indian Air Force and the Indian Army
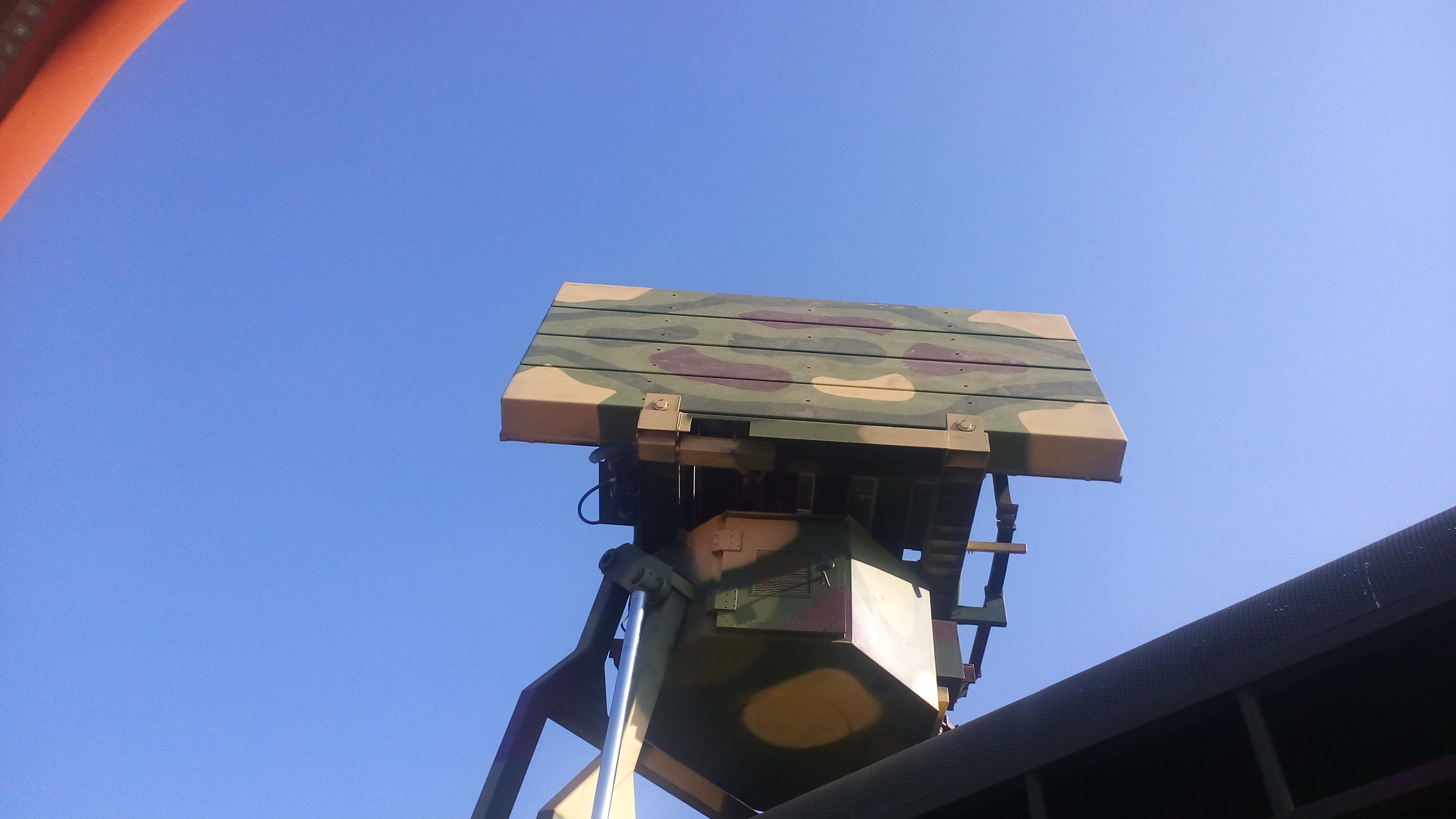
- Rajendra fire control radar at Adamya Chaitanya Exhibition 2016
  Rajendra fire control radar for the Akash SAM: The Rajendra is stated to be ready. However, it can be expected that further iterative improvements will be made. The Rajendra is a high power Passive electronically scanned array radar (PESA), with the ability able to guide up to 12 Akash SAMs against aircraft flying at low to medium altitudes. The Rajendra has a detection range of 80 km with 18 km height coverage against small fighter-sized targets and is able to track 64 targets, engaging 4 simultaneously, with up to 3 missiles per target. The Rajendra features a fully digital high-speed signal processing system with an adaptive moving target indicator, coherent signal processing, FFTs, and variable pulse repetition frequency. The entire PESA antenna array can swivel 360 degrees on a rotating platform. This allows the radar antenna to be rapidly repositioned and even conduct all-round surveillance.
- Central Acquisition Radar, a state of the art planar array S-band radar operating on the stacked beam principle. With a range of 180 km, it can track while scan 200 fighter-sized targets. Its systems are integrated on high mobility, locally built TATRA trucks for the Army and Air Force; however, it is meant to be used by all three services. Initially developed for the long-running Akash SAM system, seven were ordered by the Indian Air Force for their radar modernisation program and two of another variants were ordered by the Indian Navy for their P-28 Corvettes. The CAR has been a significant success for radar development in India, with its state of the art signal processing hardware. The ROHINI is the IAF specific variant while the REVATHI is the Indian Navy specific variant. The ROHINI has a more advanced Indian developed antenna in terms of power handling and beamforming technology while the REVATHI adds two-axis stabilisation for operation in naval conditions, as well as extra naval modes.
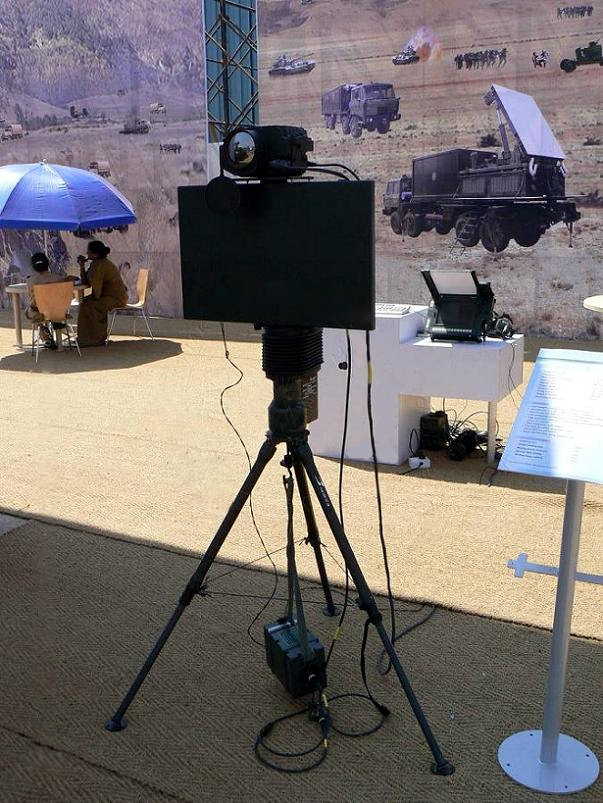
  Battlefield Surveillance Radar-Short Range (BFSR-SR) on display at Aero India-2007.
- BFSR-SR, a 2D short-range Battle Field Surveillance Radar, meant to be man-portable. Designed and developed by LRDE, the project was a systematic example of concurrent engineering, with the production agency involved through the design and development stage. This enabled the design to be brought into production quickly. The radar continues to progress further in terms of integration, with newer variants being integrated with thermal imagers for visually tracking targets detected by the radar. Up to 10 BFSR-SR can be networked together for network-centric operation. It is in use with the Indian Army and the BSF as well as export customers.
- Super Vision-2000, an airborne 3D naval surveillance radar, meant for helicopters and light transport aircraft. This program was subsequently superseded by the advanced XV-2004 which offered a more sophisticated architecture able to handle SAR and ISAR modes. The SV-2000 is a lightweight, high performance, slotted array radar operating in the X-Band. It can detect sea-surface targets such as a periscope or a vessel against heavy clutter and can also be used for navigation, weather mapping, and beacon detection. The radar can detect a large vessel at over 100 nautical miles (370 km). It is currently under modification to be fitted to the Advanced Light Helicopter and the Navy's Do-228's. Variants can be fitted to the Navy's Ka-25's as well. A more advanced variant of the Super Vision, known as the XV-2004, is now in trials and features an ISAR, SAR Capability intended for the Indian Navy's helicopter fleet.
- Swordfish Long Range Tracking Radar, a 3D AESA was developed with assistance from Elta of Israel and is similar to Elta's proven EL/M-2080 Green Pine long-range Active Array radar. The DRDO developed the signal processing and software for tracking high-speed ballistic missile targets as well as introduced more ruggedisation. The radar uses mostly Indian designed and manufactured components such as its critical high power, L Band Transmit-Receive modules and other enabling technologies necessary for active phased array radars. The LRTR can track 200 targets and has a range of above 500 km. It can detect Intermediate-range ballistic missile. The LRTR would be amongst the key elements of the Indian Ballistic Missile Defence Programme. DRDO would provide the technology to private and public manufacturers to make these high power systems.
- 3D Multi-Function Control Radar (MFCR) was developed as part of the Indian anti-ballistic missile program in cooperation with Thales of France. The MFCR is an active phased array radar and complements the Swordfish Long Range Tracking Radar, for intercepting ballistic missiles. The MFCR will also serve as the fire control radar for the AAD second-tier missile system of the ABM program. The AAD has a supplementary role against aircraft as well and can engage missiles and aircraft up to an altitude of 30 km. The MFCR fills out the final part of the DRDO's radar development spectrum and allows India to manufacture long-range 3D radars that can act as the nodes of an Air Defence Ground Environment system.
- 2D Low-Level Lightweight Radar (LLLWR) for the Indian Army, known as the Bharani, which requires many of these units for gap-filling in mountainous terrain and has been ordered into production after clearing Indian Army trials. The Indian Air Force will also acquire a more advanced unit, called the Aslesha. The LLLWR is a 2D radar with a range of 40 km against a 2 square meter target, intended as a gap-filler to plug detection gaps versus low-level aircraft in an integrated Air Defence Ground network. The LLLWR makes use of Indra-2 technology, namely a similar antenna array, but has roughly half the range and is much smaller and a far more portable unit. The LLLWR can track while scan 100 targets and provide details about their speed, azimuth, and range to the operator. The LLLWR makes use of the BFSR-SR experience and many of the subsystem providers are the same. Multiple LLLWRs can be networked together. The LLLWR is meant to detect low-level intruders, and will alert Army Air Defence fire control units to cue their weapon systems.
- 3D Short-Range Radar for the Indian Air Force – ASLESHA: The ASLESHA radars have a range of approximately 50 km against small fighter-sized targets and will be able to determine their range, speed, azimuth, and height. This radar will enable the Indian Air Force Air Defence units to accurately track low-level intruders. The radar is a semi-active phased array with a 1-meter square aperture. The DRDO was in discussions with the Indian Navy to mount these systems on small ships.
- Multi-mode radar, a 3D radar is a HAL project with DRDO's LRDE as a subsystem provider. This project to develop an advanced, lightweight Multi-mode fire control radar for the LCA Tejas fighter had faced challenges and was delayed and finally superseded by a program called the Uttam to develop an AESA FCR for the Tejas LCA. The MMR program was finally completed with Elta's (Israel) assistance and became a hybrid system incorporating the original DRDO antenna, gimbal stabilisation, and Israeli backend. The multi-mode radar has the range (for detection of a small fighter target) around 100 km can track 10 targets, can engage 2 targets and uses the lightweight system. Originally, DRDO developed an all-new combined signal and the data processor had been developed, replacing the original separate units. The new unit is much more powerful and makes use of contemporary ADSP processors. The radar's critical hardware was also developed and validated. The software for the air-to-air mode has been developed considerably (including search and track while scan in both look up and look down modes) but air-to-ground modes were still being worked upon and proved problematic. The radar development was shown to be considerably more mature than previously thought but still faced significant delays and challenges. At Aero India 2009, it was revealed that the 3D MMR project has been superseded by the new 3D AESA FCR project led by LRDE. The MMR has been completed with Elta Israel's assistance and now involved Elta EL/M-2032 technology for Air-to-Ground mapping and targeting – in order to simplify testing, the Hybrid MMR basically became an Indian variant of the EL/M-2032 with an Indian antenna and gimbal system as Elta pointed out mixing and matching Indian hardware with Israeli software would, in essence, mean a new design with a significant time impact. The "hybrid" MMR has been tested, validated and will be supplied for the initial LCA Tejas fighters.
- DRDO has indigenised components and improved subsystems of various other license-produced radars manufactured at BEL with the help of BEL scientists and other researchers. These improvements include new radar data processors for license-produced signal radars as well as local radar assemblies replacing the earlier imported ones.
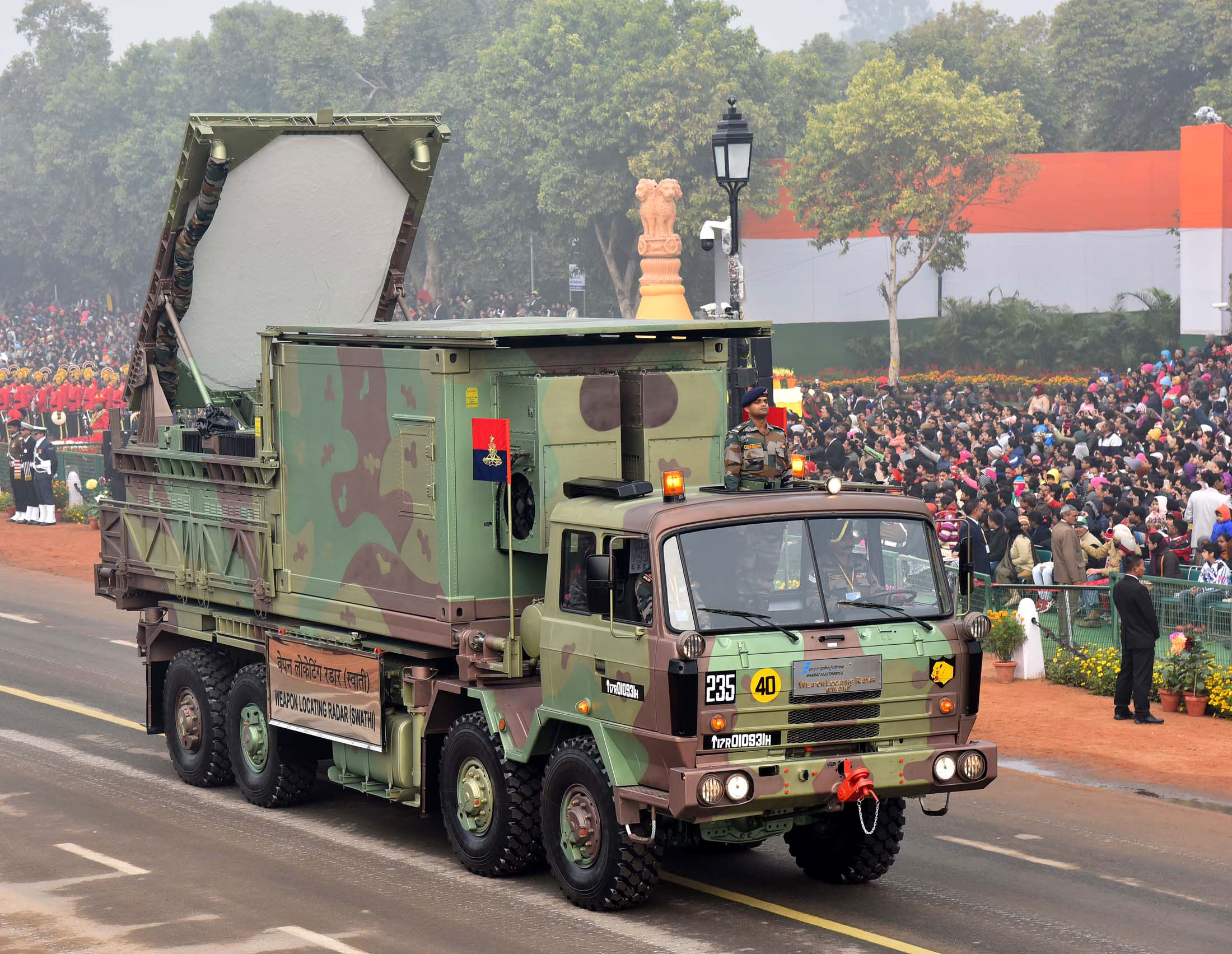
  BEL Weapon Locating Radar (Swathi) passes on the occasion of the 69th Republic Day Parade 2018.
- BEL Weapon Locating Radar: Swathi, a 3D radar developed from the Rajendra fire-control radar for the Akash system, uses a passive electronically scanned array to detect multiple targets for fire correction and weapon location. The system has been developed and demonstrated to the Army and orders have been placed In terms of performance, the WLR is stated to be superior to the AN/TPQ-37, several of which were imported by India as an interim system while the WLR got ready. The Indian Army has ordered 28 of these units.
- Ashwini: It is a quick-deployment, 4D low-level transportable radar, developed by LRDE, for the IAF. The radar can detect 2 m² RCS targets up to 150km away, with an altitude coverage of 30m to 15km. Its range is 200 km. The radar has two modes of operation: rotation and gazing. When in rotation mode, the antenna rotates at 7.5/15 rpm, providing 360º azimuth and 40° elevation surveillance coverage. When operating in gazing mode, the antenna looks in a predetermined azimuth with a surveillance coverage of 40° in elevation and ±60º in azimuth. The radar includes time synchronisation of multiple receivers, 2D digital beamforming, digital beamforming-based active array calibration, multi-beam processing, and is based on solid-state AESA technology. With an integrated IFF system and advanced ECCM capabilities, LLTR can scan both elevation and azimuth electronically. It uses open architecture for easy upgrades. LLTR can automatically detect and track aerial targets from fast fighter aircraft to slow moving UAVs and helicopters. On March 12, 2025, the MoD signed a capital acquisition deal with Bharat Electronics for 18 units of Ashwini radar, which will cost ₹2,906 crore. The IAF will deploy the radar as a plug-in option to fill in the gaps in its early warning capabilities. The system will send the feed to the IACCS.
- 3D Tactical Control Radar: a new program, the TCR is an approximately 90 km ranged system for use by the Indian Army. A highly mobile unit, it is a variant of the 3D CAR unit and packaged into 2 as verses 3 units. The Indian Army has ordered many of the types for its Air Defense Units.

Apart from the above, the DRDO has also several other radar systems currently under development or in trials, these include:

- Active Phased Array radar: a 3D radar for fighters, an MMR follow on, the APAR project aims to field a fully-fledged operational AESA fire control radar for the expected Mark-2 version of the Light Combat Aircraft. This will be the second airborne AESA program after the AEW&C project and intends to replicate DRDO's success with the ground-based radar segment to airborne systems. The overall airborne APAR program aims to prevent this technology gap from developing, with a broad-based program to bring DRDO up to par with international developers in airborne systems, both fire control, and surveillance. As of 2016, the radar was still in development, with variants expected to be fielded on future IAF fighters like the MCA or Tejas advanced Marks.
- Synthetic aperture radar & Inverse synthetic aperture radar: the DRDO's LRDE is currently working on both SAR and ISAR radars for target detection and classification. These lightweight payloads are intended for both conventional fixed wing as well as UAV applications.
- Airborne Warning and Control: a new radar-based on active electronically scanned array technology. The aim of the project is to develop an in-house capability for high power AEW&C systems, with the system covering the development of an S-Band AESA array. The aircraft will also have data-links to link fighters plus communicate with the IAF's C3I infrastructure as well as a local SATCOM (satellite communication system), along with other onboard ESM and COMINT systems. As of 2016, the system was in advanced trials and had achieved a TRL (Technical Readiness Level) of 8/10 with trials focusing on proving its self-protection equipment.
- Medium-Range Battlefield Surveillance Radar: in 2009, the LRDE (DRDO) stated that it was working on a Long-range battlefield surveillance radar. It is possible that the BFSR-LR project has replaced this earlier project and the Indian Army will utilise the BEL built ELTA designed BFSR-MR's for Medium-Range surveillance while using the LRDE designed systems for Long Range surveillance. The 2D radar was to track ground targets and provide key intelligence to the Indian Army's artillery units, with the resultant information available on various tactical networks. As of 2016, this project was not active.
- 3D Medium Power Radar: a spin-off of the experience gained via the 3D MFCR project, the 3D Medium Power Radar project is intended to field a radar with a range of approximately 300 km against small fighter-sized targets. Intended for the Indian Air Force, the radar is an active phased array, and will be transportable. It will play a significant role being used as part of the nodes of the Indian Air Force's enhanced Air Defence Ground Environment System. As of 2016, the radar was ready for IAF user trials and the IAF had ordered 8 MPRs already.
- 3D Army AD Fire Control Radar: A new program for the Indian Army, the Atulya FCR is intended to provide Army AD units with a compact fire control system for their armament. The Indian Army has a total requirement of over 60 FCRs.
- 3D Army Multi-Mission Radar: A new program for the Indian Army, the mobile compact radar system is expected to be capable of both artillery detection and air defense missions. As of 2016, it was in an advanced stage of development, with basic design completed and realisation of the prototype underway.

==== Command and control software and decision-making tools ====
- Tactical tools for wargaming: Shatranj and Sangram for the Army, Sagar for the Navy and air war software for the Air Force. All these systems are operational with the respective services.
- C3I systems: DRDO, in cooperation with BEL and private industry has developed several critical C3I (command, control, communications and intelligence systems) for the armed services. Under the project "Shakti", the Indian Army aims to spend US$300 million to network all its artillery guns using the ACCS (Artillery Command and Control System). Developed by DRDO's Centre for Artificial Intelligence & Robotics, the system comprises computers and intelligent terminals connected as a wide area network. Its main subsystems are the artillery computer centre, battery computer, remote access terminal and a gun display unit. The ACCS is expected to improve the Army's artillery operations by a factor of 10 and allowing for more rapid and accurate firepower. The ACCS will also improve the ability of commanders to concentrate that fire-power where it is most needed. The DRDO and BEL have also developed a Battle Management system for the Indian Army for its tanks and tactical units.

Other programmes in development for the Army include Corps level information and decision making software and tools, intended to link all units together for effective C3I. These systems are in production at DRDO's production partner, Bharat Electronics. These projects are being driven by the Indian Army Corps of Signals. The Indian Army is also moving towards extensive use of battlefield computers. DRDO has also delivered projects such as the Combat Net Radio for enhancing the Army's communication hardware.

- Data management and command and control systems for the Navy have been provided by the DRDO. The Navy is currently engaged in a naval networking project to network all its ships and shore establishments plus maritime patrol aircraft and sensors.
- Radar netting and multi-sensor fusion software for linking the Indian Air Force's network of radars and airbases which have been operationalised. Other systems include sophisticated and highly complex mission planning and C3I systems for missiles, such as the Agni and Prithvi ballistic missiles and the Brahmos cruise missile. These systems are common to all three services as all of them utilise different variants of these missiles.
- Simulators and training tools: DRDO and private industry have collaborated on manufacturing a range of simulators and training devices for the three services, from entry level tests for prospective entrants to the Indian Air Force, to sophisticated simulators for fighter aircraft, transports and helicopters, tanks and gunnery devices.

=== Computing technologies ===
DRDO has worked extensively on high speed computing given its ramifications for most of its defence projects. These include supercomputers for computational flow dynamics, to dedicated microprocessor designs manufactured in India for flight controllers and the like, to high speed computing boards built around Commercial Off The Shelf (COTS) components, similar to the latest trends in the defence industry.

- Supercomputing: DRDO's ANURAG developed the PACE+ Supercomputer for strategic purposes for supporting its various programmes. The initial version, as detailed in 1995, had the following specifications: The system delivered a sustained performance of more than 960 Mflops (million floating operations per second) for computational fluid dynamics programmes. Pace-Plus included 32 advanced computing nodes, each with 64 megabytes (MB) of memory that can be expanded up to 256MB and a powerful front-end processor which is a hyperSPARC with a speed of 66/90/100 megahertz (MHz). Besides fluid dynamics, these high-speed computer systems were used in areas such as vision, medical imaging, signal processing, molecular modeling, neural networks and finite element analysis. The latest variant of the PACE series is the PACE ++, a 128 node parallel processing system. With a front-end processor, it has a distributed memory and message passing system. Under Project Chitra, the DRDO is implementing a system with a computational speed of 2-3 Teraflops utilising commercial off the shelf components and the Open Source Linux Operating System.
- Processors and other critical items: DRDO has developed a range of processors and application specific integrated circuits for its critical projects. Many of these systems are modular, in the sense that they can be reused across different projects. These include "Pythagoras processor" to convert cartesian to polar coordinates, ANUCO, a floating point coprocessor and several others, including the ANUPAMA 32-bit processor, which is being used in several DRDO projects.
- Electronic components: one of the endeavours undertaken by the DRDO has been to create a substantial local design and development capability within India, both in the private and public sectors. This policy has led to several hard to obtain or otherwise denied items, being designed and manufactured in India. These include components such as radar subsystems (product specific travelling wave tubes) to components necessary for electronic warfare and other cutting edge projects. Today, there are a range of firms across India, which design and manufacture key components for DRDO, allowing it to source locally for quite a substantial chunk of its procurement. The DRDO has also endeavoured to use COTS (Commercial off the shelf) processors and technology, and follow Open Architecture standards, wherever possible, in order to pre-empt obsolescence issues and follow industry practise. One significant example is the development of an Open Architecture computer for the Light Combat Aircraft, based on the PowerPC architecture and VME64 standard. Variants of the earlier Mission computer utilising Intel 486 DX chips are already present on the Su-30 MKI, Jaguar and MiG-27 Upgrades for the Indian Air Force.
- Infosys Autolay integrated automated software for designing 3-D laminated composite elements.

=== Laser Science & Technology Centre (LASTEC) ===
DRDO is working on a slew of directed energy weapons (DEWs). LASTEC has identified DEWs, along with space security, cyber-security and hypersonic vehicles as focus areas in the next 15 years. The aim is to develop laser-based weapons, deployed on airborne as well as seaborne platforms, which can intercept missiles soon after they are launched towards India in the boost phase itself. These will be part of the ballistic missile defence system being currently developed by DRDO. LASTEC is developing a 25-kilowatt laser system to hit a missile during its terminal phase at a distance of 5–7 km. LASTEC is also working on a vehicle-mounted gas dynamic laser-based DEW system, under project Aditya, which should be ready in three years. Project Aditya is a technology demonstrator to prove beam control technology. Ultimately, solid-state lasers would be used. For US President Donald Trump visit to India in 2020, DRDO deployed the LASTEC developed vehicle-mounted gas dynamic laser-based DEW system for counter-drone operations in Ahmedabad after completion of successful trial on 21 February 2020. It can detect, identify and destroy low flying objects of smaller size carrying explosives or arms and ammunitions. The Aditya directed energy weapon system was first deployed during the visit of Brazilian president Jair Bolsonaro on Indian Republic Day 2020.

LASTEC projects include:

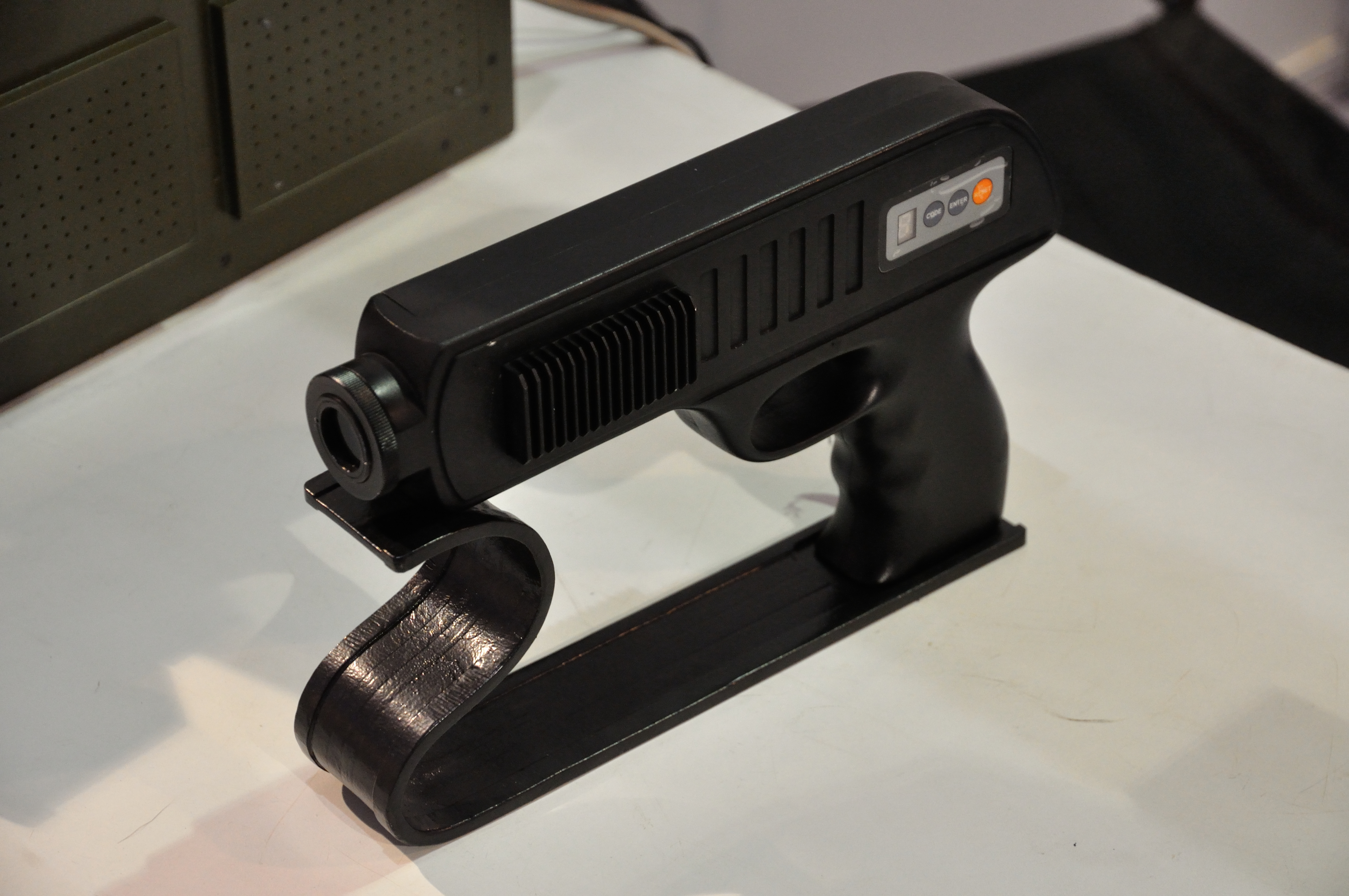
Hand-held laser dazzler.

Non-Lethal systems:

- Hand-held laser dazzler to disorient adversaries, without collateral damage. 50-metre range. Status: Ready.
- Crowd-control dazzlers mounted on vehicles to dispel rioting mobs. 250-metre range. Status: Will take 2 more years.
- Laser-based ordnance disposal system, which can be used to neutralise IEDs and other explosives from a distance. Status: Trials begin in 18 months.

Lethal Systems:

- Air defence dazzlers to take on enemy aircraft and helicopters at range of 10 km. Status: Will take 2 more years.
- 25-kilowatt laser systems to destroy missiles during their terminal phase at range of 5 to 7 km. Status: Will take 5 more years.
- At least 100-kilowatt solid-state laser systems, mounted on aircraft and ships, to destroy missiles in their boost phase itself. Status: Will take a decade.

==== Directed Energy Weapons (DEW) ====
In view of future warfare and contactless military conflict, DRDO initiated National Directed Energy Weapons Programme in collaboration with domestic private sector industries and various public institutions. It is working on several directed energy weapons (DEW) system such as KALI (electron accelerator) based on electromagnetic radiation or subatomic particle beam to achieve short, medium and long term national goals. Initially divided into two phases, Indian Army and Indian Air Force requested minimum of 20 tactical DEWs that can destroy smaller drones and electronic warfare radar systems within 6 km to 8 km distance. Under phase 2, another 20 tactical DEWs will be developed that can destroy target within 15 km to 20 km distance which will be used against troops and vehicles from ground or air platforms. As of 2020, a truck mounted DEW of 10 kilowatt laser with range of 2 km and portable tripod mounted 2 kilowatt DEW with range of 1 km were demonstrated in field operation successfully. DRDO is working on 50 kilowatt DEW along with ship motion compensation systems for the Indian Navy. In future, DRDO plans to work on a bigger 100 kW DEW.

===== DURGA II =====
DRDO is working on a classified 100 kW directed energy weapon called Directionally Unrestricted Ray-Gun Array or DURGA.

=== Quantum communication ===
A quantum key distribution link between Prayagraj and Vindhyachal, which is more than 100 kilometers away, was demonstrated by DRDO and IIT Delhi on 23 February 2022. It was accomplished using commercial-grade optical fiber. At filtered key rates of up to 10 KHz, the performance parameters were measured and were determined to be within the published international standards.

Quantum communication was demonstrated in New Delhi on 26 November 2024, by IIT Delhi and the DRDO Industry Academia–Centre of Excellence (DIA-CoE). The focus was on entanglement-based QKD for reliable and secure communication. In a controlled setup, entanglement distribution and QKD are shown across a 50 km fiber link. During a field test at IIT Delhi, the test has shown QKD and entanglement distribution across 8 km of optical fiber. In another demonstration, BBM92 protocol was used, to show the distribution of free-space entanglement between two tables that were 20 meters apart in the lab setup and 80 meters apart in real world condition. In a free-space configuration, it proved short-range quantum communication.

In a different experiment, hybrid entanglement was shown to work in a free-space setting, attaining a quantum bit error rate of about 6%, over a 10-meter distance in a lab setting. QKD systems that enable numerous independent channels powered by a single source are also being investigated. This paves the way for development of an adaptable, multi-protocol quantum communication system. The studies were conducted using an all-fiber heralded photon source that has a second-order correlation function (g² ~ 0.01) and can achieve speeds of hundreds of KHz. It is essential for the production of single photons. Additionally, an all-fiber entangled photon source with excellent visibility has been developed. With a Bell test parameter greater than 2.6, this source exhibits high quantum entanglement, which is necessary for the BBM92 protocol. A free-space heralded single photon source with a heralding rate of more than 4 million counts/sec for free space quantum communication operations has also been developed.

The successful demonstration of free-space quantum secure communication employing quantum entanglement at a distance exceeding 1 km via a free-space optical link was made on 16 June 2025, by DIA-CoE and IIT Delhi. The experiment achieved a quantum bit error rate of less than 7% and a secure key rate of around 240 bits per second. This entanglement-assisted quantum secure communication opens the door to real-time quantum cyber security applications, including creation of quantum networks, the quantum internet, and long-distance QKD. In 2024, DRDO team successfully distributing quantum keys via entanglement across a 100 kilometer spool of telecom-grade optical fiber.

== Combat vehicles & engineering ==
=== Tanks and armoured vehicles ===
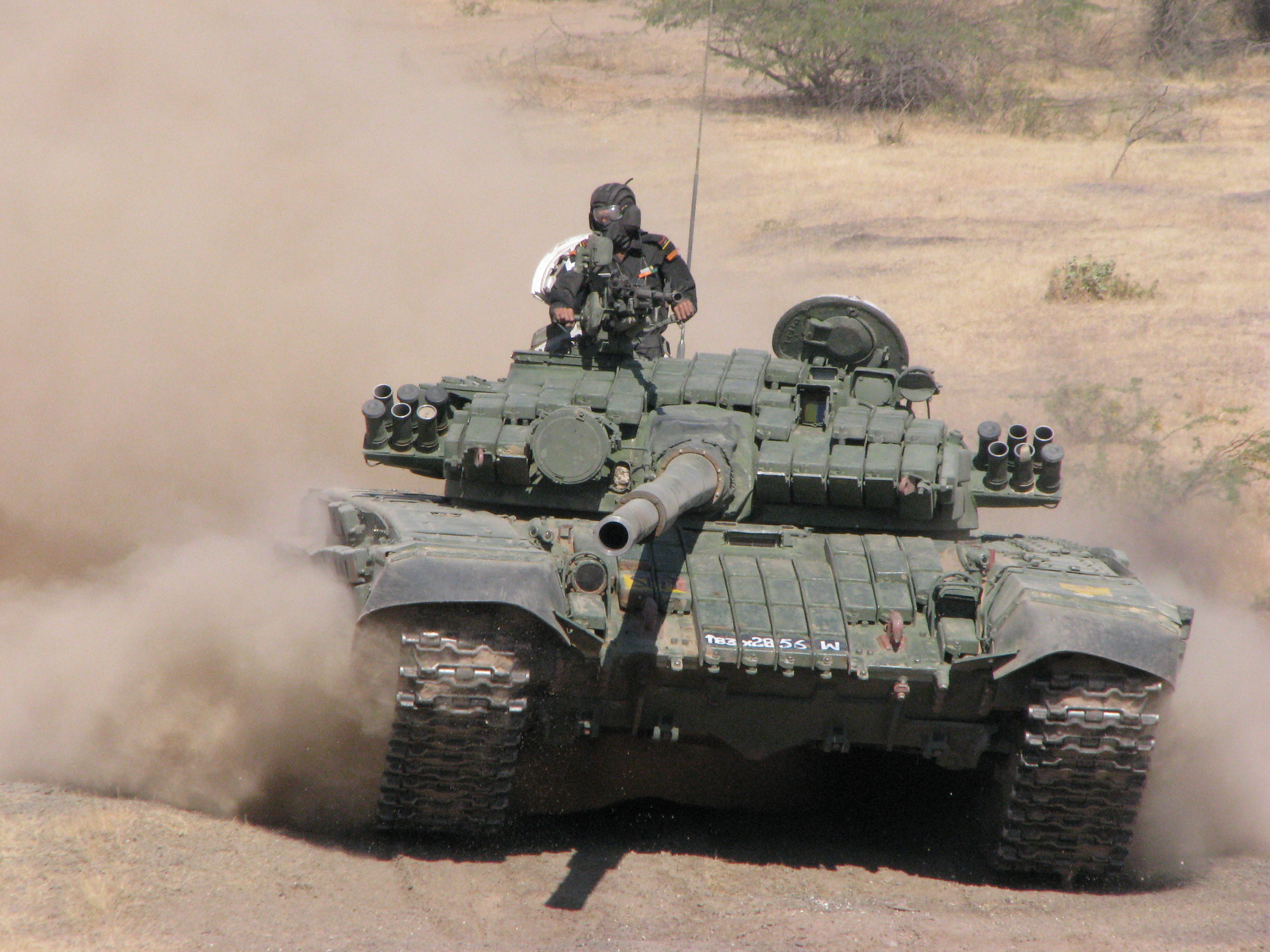
T-72 Ajeya of the Indian Army

- Ajeya upgrade (Invincible): upgrade for the T-72 fleet, incorporating a mix of locally made and imported subsystems. 250 have been ordered. Local systems include the DRDO-developed ERA, a DRDO-developed laser warning system and combat net radio, the Bharat Electronics Limited advanced land navigation system consisting of fibre optic gyros and GPS, NBC protection and DRDO's fire detection and suppression system amongst other items. Imported systems include a compact thermal imager and fire control system and a new 1000 hp engine.
- Anti-tank ammunition: DRDO developed the FSAPDS for the 125 mm calibre, meant for India's T-72 tanks, the 120 mm FSAPDS and HESH rounds for the Arjun tank and 105 mm FSAPDS rounds for the Army's Vijayanta and T-55 tanks. Significant amounts of 125 mm anti-tank rounds manufactured by the Ordnance Factory Board were rejected. The problems were traced to improper packaging of the charges by the OFB, leading to propellant leakage during storage at high temperatures. The locally developed rounds were rectified and requalified. Production of these local rounds was then restarted. Since 2001, over 130,000 rounds have been manufactured by the OFB. The DRDO said in 2005 that it had developed a Mk2 version of the 125 mm round, with higher power propellant for greater penetration. In parallel, the OFB announced in 2006 that it was also manufacturing 125 mm IMI (Israel Military Industries) rounds. It is believed that this might assist in improving the OFB's APFSDS manufacturing capability. These rounds and presumably the Mk2 round and will be used by both the T-72 and T-90 formations in the Indian Army.
- Various armour technologies and associated subsystems from composite armour and explosive reactive armour to Radios (Combat Net Radio with frequency hopping and encryption) and Battle Management systems. Fire-control systems are currently in production at BEL for the Arjun tanks. The first batch in production have a hybrid Sagem-DRDO system, with Sagem sights and local fire control computer.
- Arjun tank: The penultimate design was accepted by the Indian Army and is now in series production at HVF Avadi.
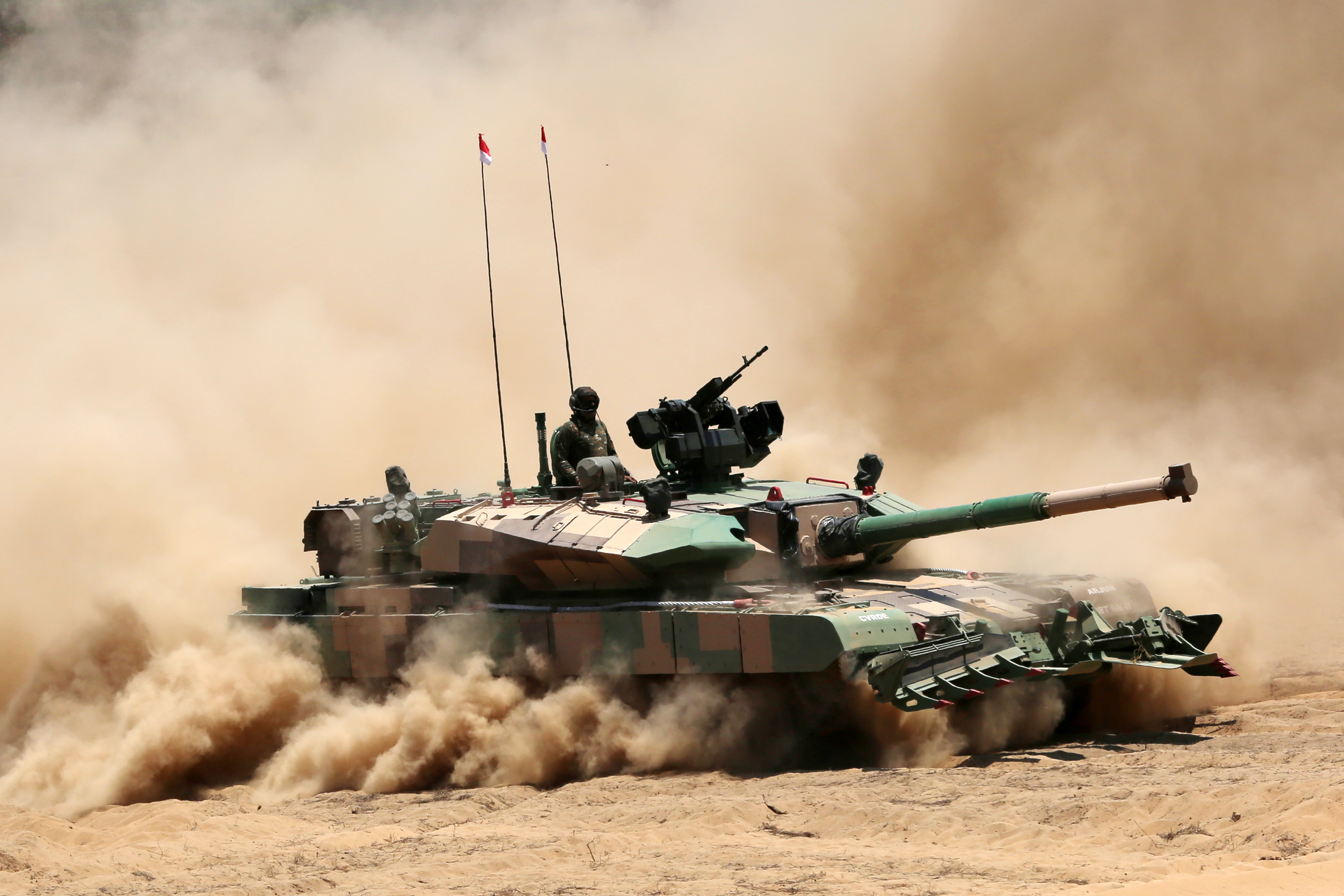
  Arjun MBT Mark 1A
  The Arjun follows a template similar to the tanks developed by western nations, with containerised ammunition storage, with blast off panels, heavy Composite armour, a 120 mm gun (rifled as compared to smoothbore on most other tanks), a modern FCS with high hit probability and a 1,400 horsepower (1,000 kW) engine and a four-man crew. Originally designed in response to a possible Pakistani acquisition of the M1 Abrams, the project fell into disfavour once it became clear that Pakistan was instead standardising on cheaper (and less capable) T-80 type tanks. In such a milieu, acquiring the Arjun in huge numbers is simply unnecessary for the Indian Army, given the additional logistic costs of standardising on an entirely new type. The Indian Army ordered 124 units in 2000 and an additional 124 units in 2010 and Mark 1A variant is already developed and ordered.
- DRDO WhAP

=== Modification of BMP-2 series ===
India licence manufactures the BMP-2 with local components. The vehicle has been used as the basis for several locally designed modifications, ranging from missile launchers to engineering support vehicles. The DRDO and its various labs have been instrumental in developing these mission specific variants for the Indian Army.

- Armoured Engineering Reconnaissance Vehicle for enabling the combat engineers to acquire and record terrain survey data. The instruments mounted on the amphibious vehicle are capable of measuring width of obstacle, bed profile, water depth and bearing capacity of soil of the obstacle in real time which are helpful in taking decisions regarding laying of tracks or building of bridges.
- Armoured Amphibious Dozer with amphibious capability for earth moving operations in different terrain for preparation of bridging sites, clearing obstacles and debris and to fill craters. Self-recovery of the vehicle is also a built-in feature using a rocket-propelled anchor.
- Carrier Mortar Tracked: designed to mount and fire an 81 mm mortar from within vehicle. Capacity to fire from 40° to 85° and traverse 24° on either side; 108 rounds of mortar ammunition stowed.
- Armoured Ambulance based on the BMP-2 vehicle.
- NBC Reconnaissance Vehicle: this variant has instrumentation for determining NBC contamination, as well as bringing back samples. The vehicle includes a plow for scooping up soil samples, to instrumentation such as a radiation dosimeter amongst other key items.

=== Other engineering vehicles ===
- Bridge Layer Tank: claimed by DRDO to be amongst the best bridging systems available on a medium class tank. It has an option to carry a 20-metre or 22-metre class 70 MLC bridge, which can be negotiated by all tanks in service with Indian Army.
- Amphibious Floating Bridge and Ferry System intended for transporting heavy armour, troops and engineering equipment across large and deep water obstacles. The vehicle can convert to a fully decked bridge configuration of 28.4 metres in length in 9 minutes. Two more vehicles can be joined in tandem to form a floating bridge of 105 metres in length in 30 minutes. The bridge superstructure is integrated with floats to provide stability and additional buoyancy. The vehicle is also capable of retracting its wheels for use as a grounded bridge/ramp for high banks.
- Arjun Bridge Layer Tank: the BLT-Arjun is an all-new design with a scissor type bridge laying method, which helps it avoid detection from afar. It uses the chassis of the Arjun tank and can take higher weights than the BLT-72.
- Sarvatra Multi-span Bridge System: the bridge can be deployed over water and land obstacles to provide 75 metres of bridge-length for battle tanks, supply convoys and troops. The system consists of a light aluminum alloy scissors bridge and was approved for production in March 2000 trials. One complete set of the multi span mobile bridging system includes five truck-mounted units with a bridge-span of 15 metres each. The system is designed to take the weight of the Arjun MBT, by far the heaviest vehicle in the Army's inventory. Microprocessor based control system reduces the number of personnel required to deploy and operationalise the bridge. The bridging equipment is carried on a Tatra Kolos chassis and the system is built by Bharat Earth Movers Ltd (BEML).
- Mobile Decontamination System: with the NBC aspect of the battlefield in mind, the DRDO developed a Tatra vehicle based Mobile Decontamination system for decontamination of personnel, clothing, equipment, vehicles & terrain during war. The main sub-systems of mobile decontamination system are: pre-wash, chemical wash and post wash systems respectively. The pre-wash system consists of a 3000-litre stainless steel water tank and a fast suction pump. A high-pressure jet with a capacity of 3400 L/hour and a low-pressure jet with a capacity of 900 L/hour and 1600 L/hour are included. The chemical wash system is capable of mixing two powders and two liquids with variable feed rates and has a five-litre per minute slurry emulsion flow rate. The post wash system consists of a high-pressure hot water jet, a hot water shower for personnel and provision of steam for decontamination of clothing. The decontamination systems have been introduced into the services. The system is under production for the Army at DRDO's partnering firms, with the DRDO itself manufacturing the pilot batch.
- Remotely Operated Vehicle (ROV)/Daksh: A tracked robotic vehicle with staircase climbing ability has been developed and is particularly intended for remote explosion of explosive devices. The ROV is carried in a specially designed carrier vehicle with additional armament and firing ports. The ROV itself is fairly sophisticated, with provision to carry various optronic payloads, an articulated gripper to pick up objects, an ability to traverse difficult terrain including staircases, as well as an integral waterjet projector to blow up explosive packages. It was formally inducted into Indian army's corps of engineers on 19 December 2011. The Indian army placed a total order of 20 ROVs and 6 of them are now operational with army. Each unit cost about Rs. 9 million.
- DRDO is developing robotic soldiers and mules capable of carrying luggage up to 400 kg at high altitudes.
- DRDO developed Short Span Bridging System (SSBS) of 10 meter length and 4 meter wide that can cover a gap of 9.5 meter on single span. The system is mounted on a 8x8 BEML-Tatra truck. The project first started with a small prototype development of 5 meter SSBS on a 6x6 BEML-Tatra chassis. Indian Army inducted 12 SSBS of 10 meter length on 3 July 2021.

=== In development ===
- Abhay IFV (Fearless): an IFV design in prototype form. This IFV will have a 40 mm gun based on the proven Bofors L70 (Armour piercing and explosive rounds), a fire-control system derived from the Arjun MBT project with a thermal imager, all-electric turret and gun stabilisation, a locally designed FLAME launcher for locally manufactured Konkurs-M anti-tank missiles and an Indian diesel engine. The armour will be lightweight composite. Abhay was later superseded by the development of Vikram VT-21, for which DRDO aided in design and development.
- Armoured vehicle for Paramilitary forces: a wheeled armoured vehicle, the AVP was displayed at Defexpo-2006. The AVP has armoured glass windows and firing ports, as well as provision for heavier calibre small arms, and crowd control equipment. Currently at prototype stage.
- Mining and De-mining equipment: the Self Propelled Mine Burier has been developed by the DRDO for a requirement projected by the Indian Army. It is an automated mine laying system developed on a high mobility vehicle and is currently in trials. The Counter-Mine flail, is a vehicle built upon the T-72 chassis and has a series of fast moving flails to destroy mines. A prototype has been displayed.

== Naval research and development ==
=== Sonars ===
Naval Physical and Oceanographic Laboratory (NPOL), Bharat Electronics and the Indian Navy have developed and productionised a range of sonars and related systems for the Indian Navy's frontline combat ships.

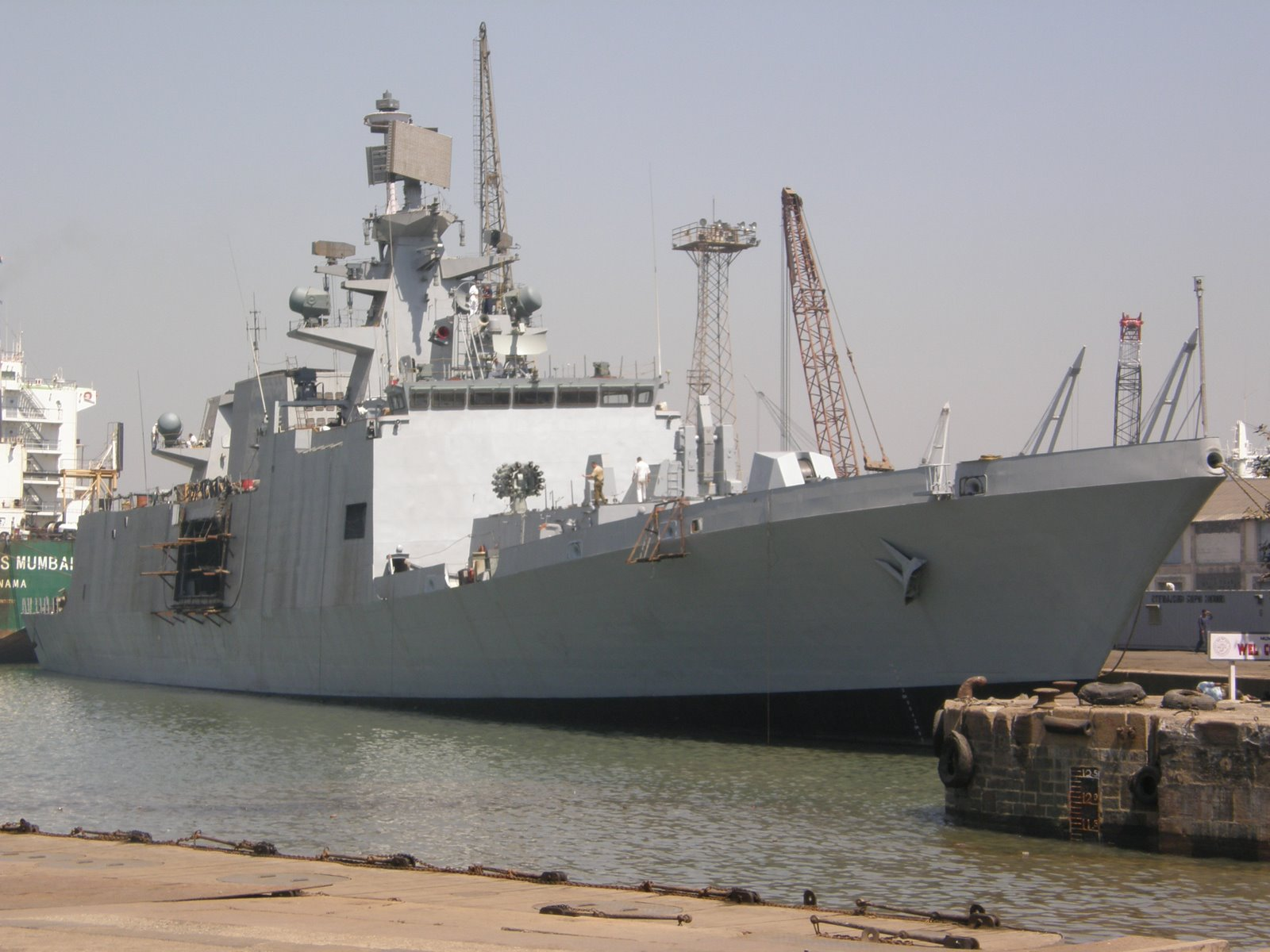
The Shivalik class of frigates contain significant DRDO-developed systems

These include:

- APSOH (Advanced Panoramic Sonar Hull mounted),
- HUMVAD (Hull Mounted Variable Depth sonar),
- HUMSA (Follow on to the APSOH series; the acronym HUMSA stands for Hull Mounted Sonar Array),
- Nagin (Towed Array Sonar),
- Panchendriya (Submarine sonar and fire control system).

Other sonars such as the airborne sonar Mihir are in trials, whilst work is proceeding apace on a new generation of sonars. DRDO's sonars are already present on the Indian Navy's most powerful ships. The standard fit for a front line naval ship would include the HUMSA-NG hull mounted sonar and the Nagin towed array sonar. The Mihir is a dunking sonar meant for use by the Naval ALH, working in conjunction with its Tadpole sonobuoy. The Panchendriya is in production for the Kilo class submarine upgrades.

=== Torpedoes ===
DRDO is currently engaged in developing multiple torpedo designs. These include a lightweight torpedo that has been accepted by the Navy and cleared for production.

==== Advanced Light Torpedo (Shyena) ====
Development of Shyena was started during 1990 under Naval Science and Technological Laboratory (NSTL). It is electrically propelled, can target submarines with a speed of 33 knots with endurance of six minutes in both shallow and deep waters. It is guided by active/passive acoustic homing that transition from warm to cold medium.

==== Varunastra ====
Varunastra is developed by Naval Science and Technological Laboratory (NSTL) as an advanced heavyweight anti-submarine torpedo that is powered by 250 KWs Silver Oxide Zinc (AgOZn) batteries. It is wire guided with active-passive acoustic homing and additionally augumented by GPS/NavIC satellite guidance mechanism.

==== Under development ====
The DRDO also developed and productionised a microprocessor controlled triple tube torpedo launcher for the Indian Navy as well as a towed torpedo decoy.

=== Anti-submarine missile ===
==== SMART ====
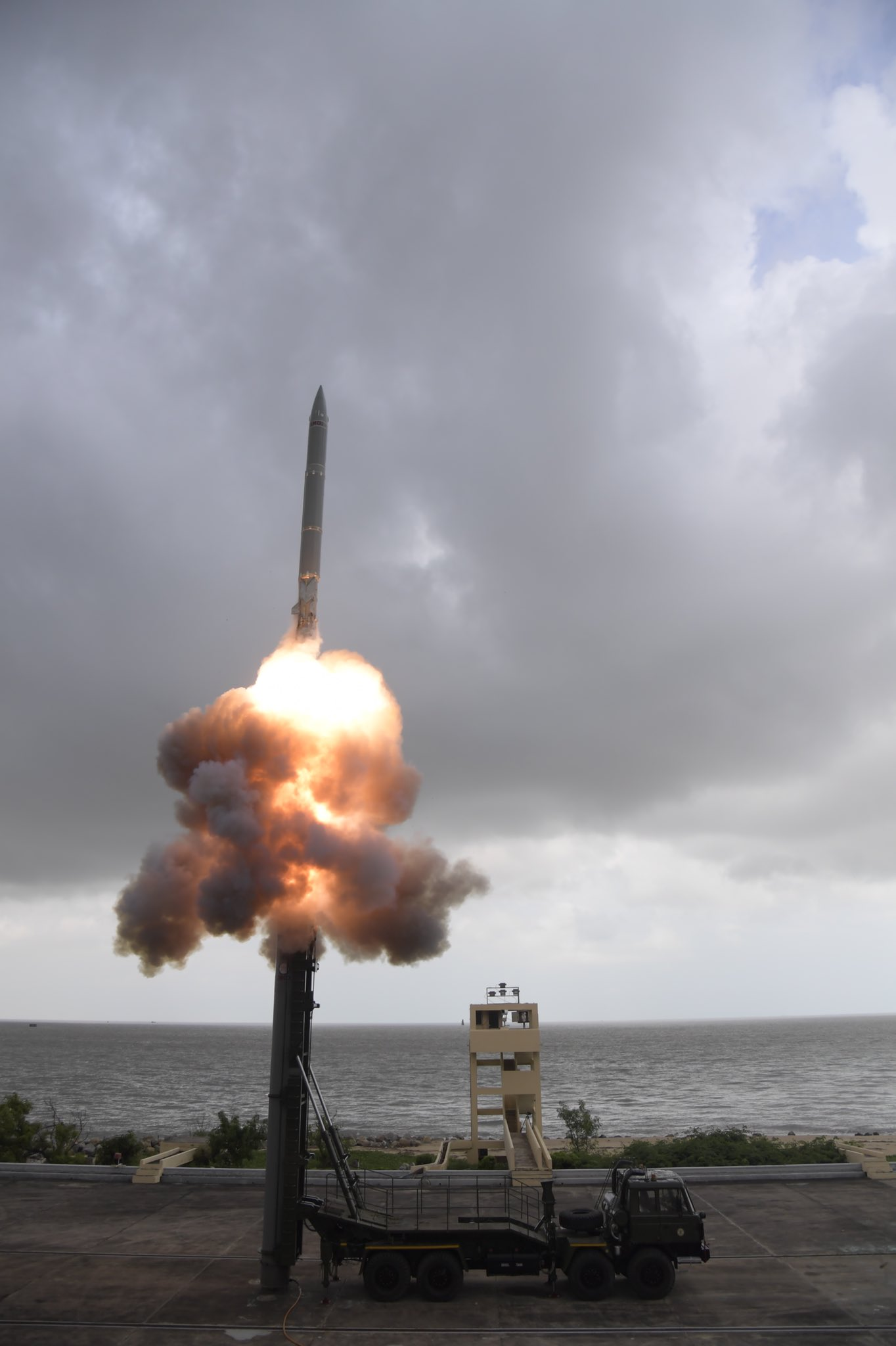
SMART launched from Integrated Test Range (ITR).

SMART or Supersonic Missile Assisted Release of Torpedo is a 650 km range hybrid system that involves a missile carrier and torpedo payload for anti-submarine warfare It can be launched from warship or a truck-based coastal battery.

=== Electromagnetic catapult ===
As per August 2024 media report, DRDO has developed a scaled-down electromagnetic catapult prototype capable of launching payloads up to 400 kg over a short span of 16 to 18 meters.

=== Marine propulsion ===
==== Air-independent propulsion ====
Naval Materials Research Laboratory (NMRL) in collaboration with Larsen & Toubro and Thermax developed a 270 kilowatt Phosphoric Acid Fuel Cell (PAFC) to power the Scorpène design based Kalvari-class submarines. It produces electricity by reacting with hydrogen generated from sodium borohydride and stored liquid oxygen with phosphoric acid acting as an electrolyte. On 8 March 2021, NMRL successfully conducted the final developmental test of the indigenous air-independent propulsion (AIP) system.

On 30 December 2024, Mazagon Dock Shipbuilders and the Ministry of Defense have signed a ₹1,990 crore (equivalent to ₹21 billion or US$230 million in 2026) deal for the fabrication of AIP Plug to integrate DRDO-AIP in conventional submarines.

=== Shipboard electronic countermeasure ===
Defence Laboratory at Jodhpur developed Short Range Chaff Rocket (SRCR), Medium Range Chaff Rocket (MRCR) and Long Range Chaff Rocket (LRCR) as part of passive expendable electronic countermeasure technology for the Indian Navy as per their qualitative requirement. The trials were successfully completed in the Arabian Sea as of April 2021. Unlike other systems, it uses much less quantity of chaff material as decoy for incoming missiles making it useful for longer duration use. The technology was already cleared for mass production by Indian private-sector industries.

==== Medium Range-Microwave Obscurant Chaff Rocket ====
Specialized fibers with a diameter of a few microns that exhibit distinctive microwave obscuration capabilities have been developed by Defense Laboratory. It reduces radar detection by obscuring radar signals and can form a microwave shield over platforms and assets.

Microwave Obscurant Chaff (MOC) is carried on a medium range chaff rocket. When the rocket is fired, it creates a microwave obscurant cloud that spreads over a big enough region and lasts long enough to provide an effective defense against adversaries using radio frequency seekers.

Phase-I trials of Medium Range-Microwave Obscurant Chaff Rocket (MR-MOCR) were successfully carried out from Indian Navy ships, proving the persistence and blooming of the MOC cloud around naval ships. The Indian Navy has verified and validated the Radar Cross Section (RCS) reduction of an aerial target up to ninety percent in Phase-II trials. On June 26, 2024, MR-MOCR was successfully transferred to the Indian Navy by DRDO after meeting all qualifying requirements.

=== Other projects ===
These have included indigenisation of various components (for instance, adsorbent material for submarines, radar components, naval ship signature reduction efforts and materials technology). DRDO has played a significant role in the development of warship grade steel in India and its productionisation. DRDO has also assisted private industry in developing EW trainers, ship simulators for training and health monitoring systems for onboard equipment. Other equipment for the Navy includes underwater telephone sets, and VLF communication equipment, for the Navy's submarines. DRDO's IRDE has also developed optronic fire control systems for the Navy's and the Coast Guard's ships.

==== Information command and control systems ====
DRDO's labs have been part of projects to develop sophisticated command and control systems for the Navy, such as the EMCCA (Equipment Modular for Command and Control Application) which ties together various sensors and data systems. The EMCCA system gives commanders on the ship a consolidated tactical picture and adds to the ship's maritime combat power.

DRDO labs are also engaged in supporting the Navy's ambitious naval enterprise wide networking system, a programme to link all naval assets together via datalinks, for sharing tactical information.

==== Mines and targets ====
Three kinds of mines, processor based mine, moored mine and processor based exercise mine are in production for the Navy. Targets developed for the Navy include a static target called the Versatile Acoustic target and a mobile target called the programmable deep mobile target (PDMT).

==== In development ====
- A Submarine Escape set, used by crew to escape from abandoned submarines. The set consists of breathing apparatus and Hydro-suit.
- New generation Sonars and EW equipment.
- Heavyweight torpedoes, underwater remotely operated vehicles, improved signature reduction technology for naval applications.

== Missile systems ==
=== Integrated Guided Missile Development Programme (IGMDP) ===
The IGMDP was launched by the Indian Government to develop the ability to develop and design a missile locally, and manufacture a range of missile systems for the three defence services. The programme has seen significant success in its two most important constituents – the Agni missiles and the Prithvi missiles, while two other programmes, the Akash surface to air missile (SAM) and the anti-tank Nag missile have seen significant orders. The Trishul missile, a sub-programme to develop short-range SAM for the Indian Armed Forces faced persistent problems throughout its development. Finally the project was terminated in 2008 as a technology demonstrator.

==== Prithvi ====
The Prithvi (Earth) missiles are a range of SRBMs produced for the Indian Air Force and Army; a variant for the Navy has been deployed on Sukanya class patrol vessel. Another submarine-launched variant known as the K-15 is under development. The Prithvi is an extremely accurate liquid fuelled missile with a range of up to 350 km. While relatively inexpensive and accurate, with a good payload, its logistics footprint is high, on account of it being liquid fuelled.

==== Agni ====
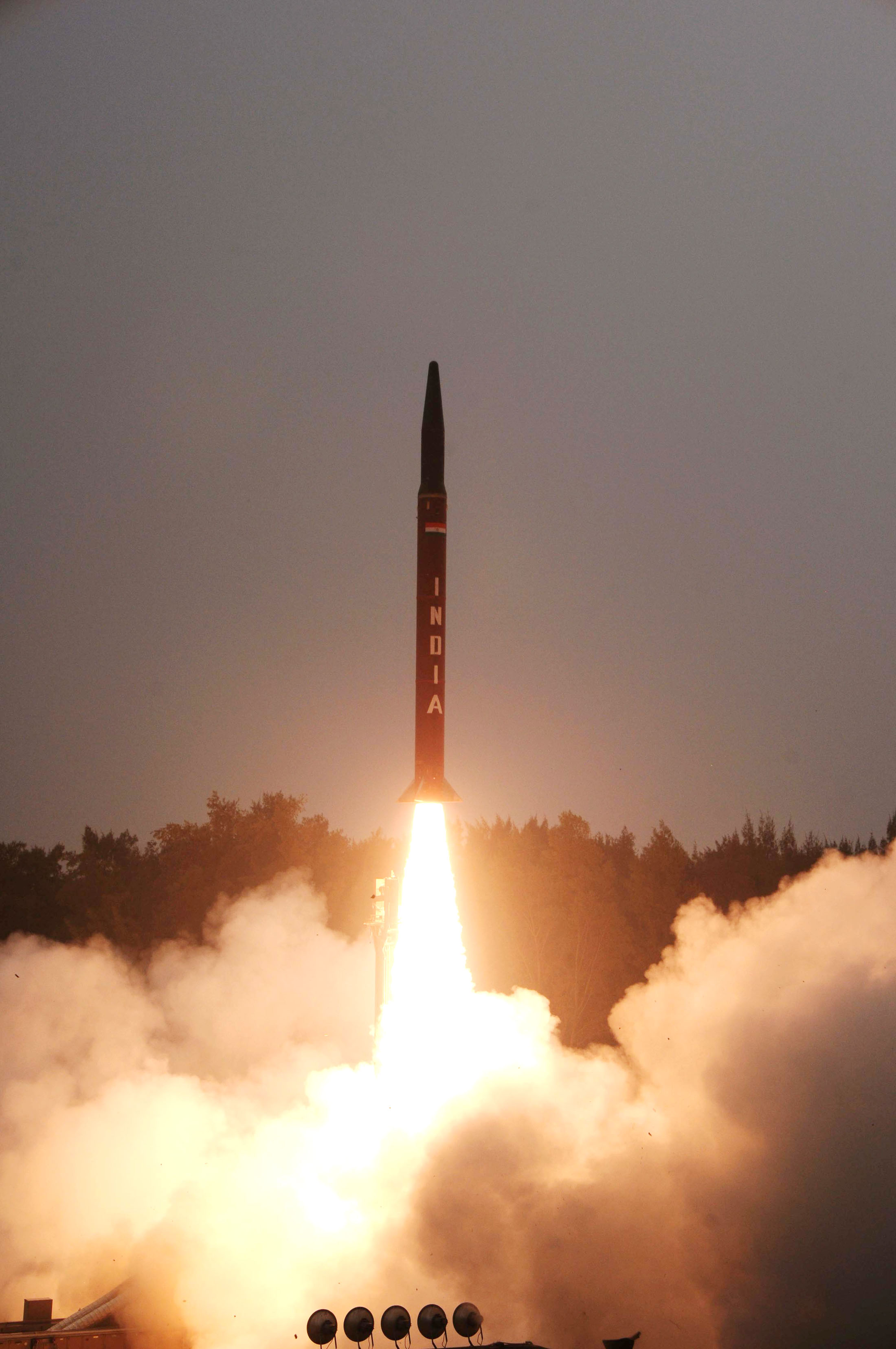
Agni A1-06 missile flight tested from Wheeler Island on 1 December 2011.

The Agni (Fire) ballistic missiles are a range of MRBMs, IRBMs, ICBMs meant for long-range deterrence. The Agni-III has range of up to 3,500 km (2,175 mi). The Agni-I and Agni-II have been productionised, although exact numbers remain classified.

First trials of the Agni-III saw problems and the missile test did not meet its objectives. The second test was successful. Further tests of the Agni-III are planned to validate the missile and its subsystems, which include new propellant and guidance systems, a new reentry vehicle and other improvements.

The Agni-V missile is an Intercontinental ballistic missile meant for long-range deterrence. The Agni-V is the newest version and has the longest range of up to 5000–6000 km. Agni-V would also carry Multiple independently targetable reentry vehicle payloads and will have countermeasures against Anti-ballistic missile systems. It was successfully test-fired on 19 April 2012. The missile will utilise a canister and will be launched from it. Sixty percent of the missile will be similar to the Agni-III missile. Advanced technologies like ring laser gyroscope and accelerometer will be used in the new missile. DRDO plans to develop reusable missiles which will be a combination of ballistic and cruise missile technology. During an interview on 24 August 2014, The DRDO chief disclosed the plans of DRDO designing a Long Range ballistic Anti-ship missile.

===== Agni-P =====
Agni-P is a new generation of medium range ballistic missile from the Agni series that incorporates the latest developments in design, composite materials, fuels, navigation and guidance system. As of 2021, it is the smallest and lightest missile of the Agni family.

==== Akash ====
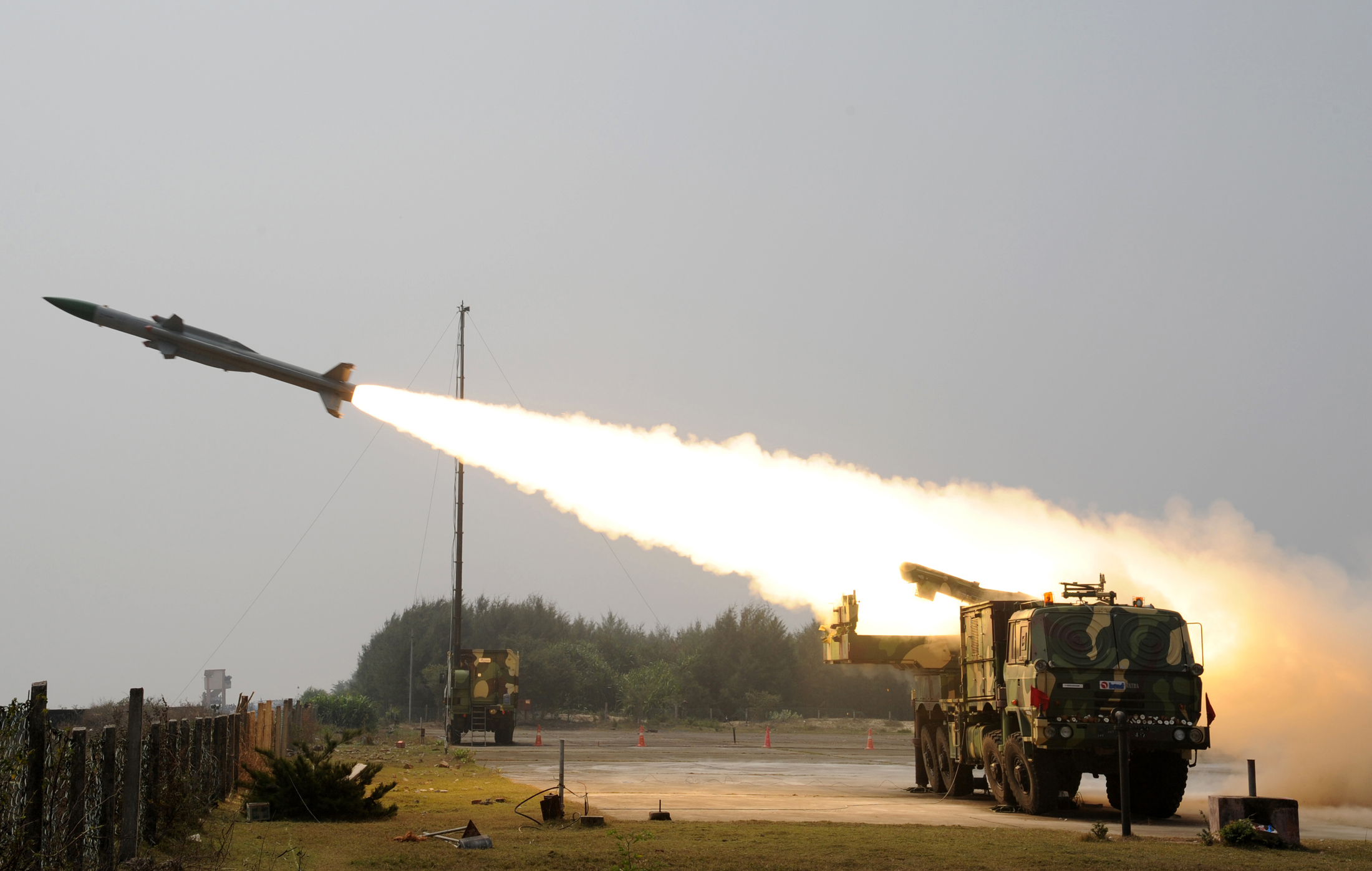
Akash Surface to Air Missile System flight-tested at the Integrated Test Range (ITR), Chandipur

The Akash (Sky or ether) is a medium-range surface-to-air missile system consisting of the command guidance ramjet powered Akash along with the dedicated service specific launchers, battery control radar (the Rajendra Block III), a central acquisition radar, battery and group control centres. The Akash project has yielded spinoffs like the Central Acquisition radar and weapon locating radar.

The Akash system cleared its user trials with the Indian Air Force in 2007. The user trials had the Akash intercept flying targets at ITR, Chandipur. The Akash missile struck its targets in every test. The Indian Air force has since been satisfied with the performance of the missile and ordered two squadrons of the Akash, with a squadron having eight launchers

The Indian Air Force placed an order for an additional six squadrons of the Akash SAM in 2010, with an order of 750 missiles (125 per squadron). This order makes a total of a 1000 Akash SAMs on order for the Indian Air Force for eight squadrons. In June 2010, the Defence Acquisition Council placed an order of the Akash missile system, valued at ₹12,500 crore (US$1.3 billion). Bharat Dynamics Limited will be the system integrator and nodal production agency for the Akash Army variant.

==== Trishul ====
The Trishul (Trident) is a short range surface-to-air missile developed by India. It was developed by Defence Research and Development Organisation as a part of the Integrated Guided Missile Development Program. It can also be used as an anti-sea skimmer from a ship against low flying attacking missiles. Trishul has a range of 9 km (5.6 mi) It is powered by a dual thrust propulsion stage using high-energy solid propellant. Trishul weighs 130 kg (290 lb) and is capable of carrying a 15 kg (33 lb) warhead.

The Trishul missile project was commissioned in 1983 as a part of Integrated Guided Missile Development Program. The project was to be completed by 1992 and the missile would be fitted to Brahmaputra-class frigates as an anti-sea skimmer. In 1985, Trishul made its first unguided flight from Satish Dhawan Space Centre, Sriharikota. The missile made its first full range guided flight in 1989. In 1992, the missile was successfully tested against a target and reached Mach 2 speed. In 1997, the associated radar systems for detecting the incoming sea-skimmer were operational. The launch system was developed by Bharat Dynamics Limited in 1998. In 2003, Government of India announced that the missile will be a technology demonstrator and de-linked it from other projects. The missile was successfully test-fired in 2005. The development cost of the programme was ₹2.826 billion (US$30 million) and the Defence minister announced the official closure of the programme in 2008.

==== Nag ATGM ====
The Nag anti-tank missile (Cobra) is a guided missile system intended for the Indian Air Force and the Indian Army. The Army will deploy the Nag on ground-based launchers and from helicopters, whereas the Air Force will rely on helicopter based units. The Nag has an Imaging Infrared (IIR) seeker and has a top and direct attack capability, with a tandem warhead. The Army's land missile carrier and launcher, known as the Namica, carries several ready to use Nag missiles within and four Nag missiles in an extendable launcher above the turret. The Namica has its own FLIR based sighting and fire control unit.

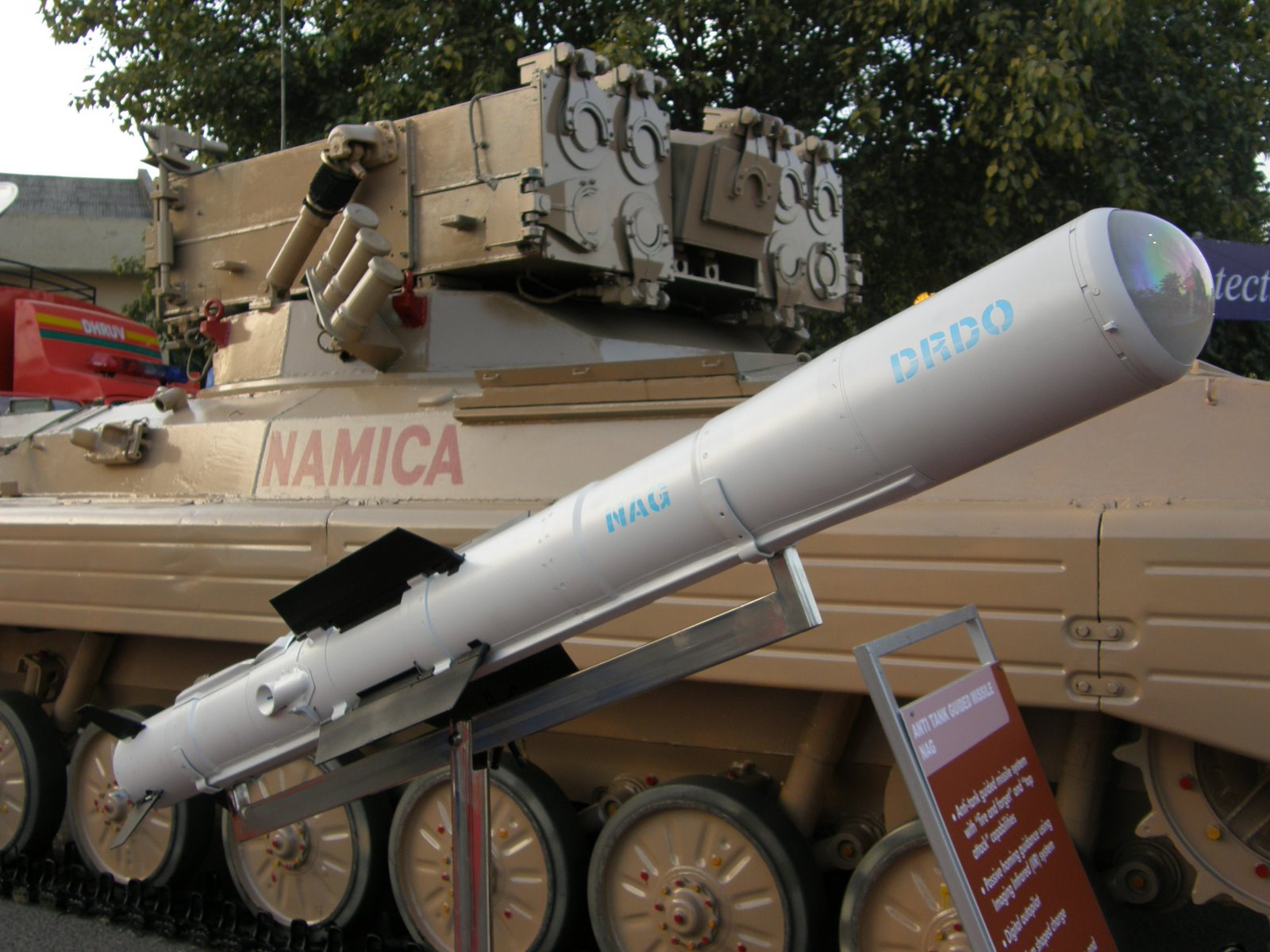
Nag missile

The Air Force and Army will also use their Advanced Light helicopters (ALH) (HAL Dhruv) and the HAL Light Combat Helicopter (LHC) as Nag carriers. The ALHs will be equipped with IRDE (DRDO) developed HELITIS (Heliborne Imaging and Targeting systems) with a combination of a FLIR and laser range finder in a stabilised turret for target acquisition and designation. The thermal imager is likely to be imported, but the gimballed turret, stabilisation, laser range finder and associated electronics have been designed in India and will be manufactured locally. The Nag ATGM is regarded as a highly capable missile, even though its development has been protracted, mainly due to the technological challenges of developing a state of the art IIR sensor equipped top attack missile. The Nag is still cheaper than most imported missiles in its category and is earmarked for the Army and Air Force.

The Nag anti-tank guided missile was cleared for production in July 2009 and there are uncorroborated reports since that it may be purchased by Tanzania, Botswana and Morocco. The Nag will complement the existing Russian 9M113 Konkurs Anti-tank guided missile and European missile MILAN in Indian usage, both of which are manufactured under licence by Bharat Dynamics Limited.

=== Surface to Air missile ===
==== Barak 8 ====
India and Israel have worked out an agreement to develop and produce the long-range Barak 8 air defence system for both the Indian and the Israeli militaries. The initial co-development funding is about US$350 million, of which IAI will finance 50 per cent. The venture is a tripartite one, between the DRDO, the Indian Navy, and the IAI. The missile is referred to as the LRSAM in Indian Government literature, and will have a range of 72 km (45 mi). Israel Aircraft Industries refers to the system as Barak-8. IAI states that the missile will have a dual pulse motor, is vertically launched and is able to engage both aircraft and sea skimming missiles. It has a fully active seeker, and the Barak-8 Weapons system is capable of multiple simultaneous engagements. It will have a two way datalink for midcourse update, as well as be able to integrate into larger C3I networks. The primary fire control sensor for the naval Barak-8/LRSAM will be the ELTA MF-STAR Naval AESA radar which Israel claims to be superior to many existing systems worldwide. The dual pulse rocket motor for the SAM was developed by DRDO, and the prototypes were supplied to IAI for integration with IAI systems to develop the complete missile.

The other variant of the LRSAM will be fielded by the Indian Air Force. Along with the Akash SAM, the LRSAM fills a longer range requirement and both types will complement each other. Each unit of the MR-SAM would consist of a command and control centre, with an acquisition radar, a guidance radar and 3 launchers with eight missiles each.

A 4-year, US$300 million System Design & Development phase to develop unique system elements and an initial tranche of the land-based missiles is estimated. The radars, C2 centres, TEL's and missiles will be codeveloped by Israel and India. In turn, IAI and its Israeli partners have agreed to transfer all relevant technologies and manufacturing capabilities to India allowing India to manufacture the LRSAM systems locally as well as support them. The Barak-8 next generation long-range surface-to-air missile (LR-SAM) had its first test-flight on 29 May 2010.

=== Air to Air missile ===
==== Astra missile ====
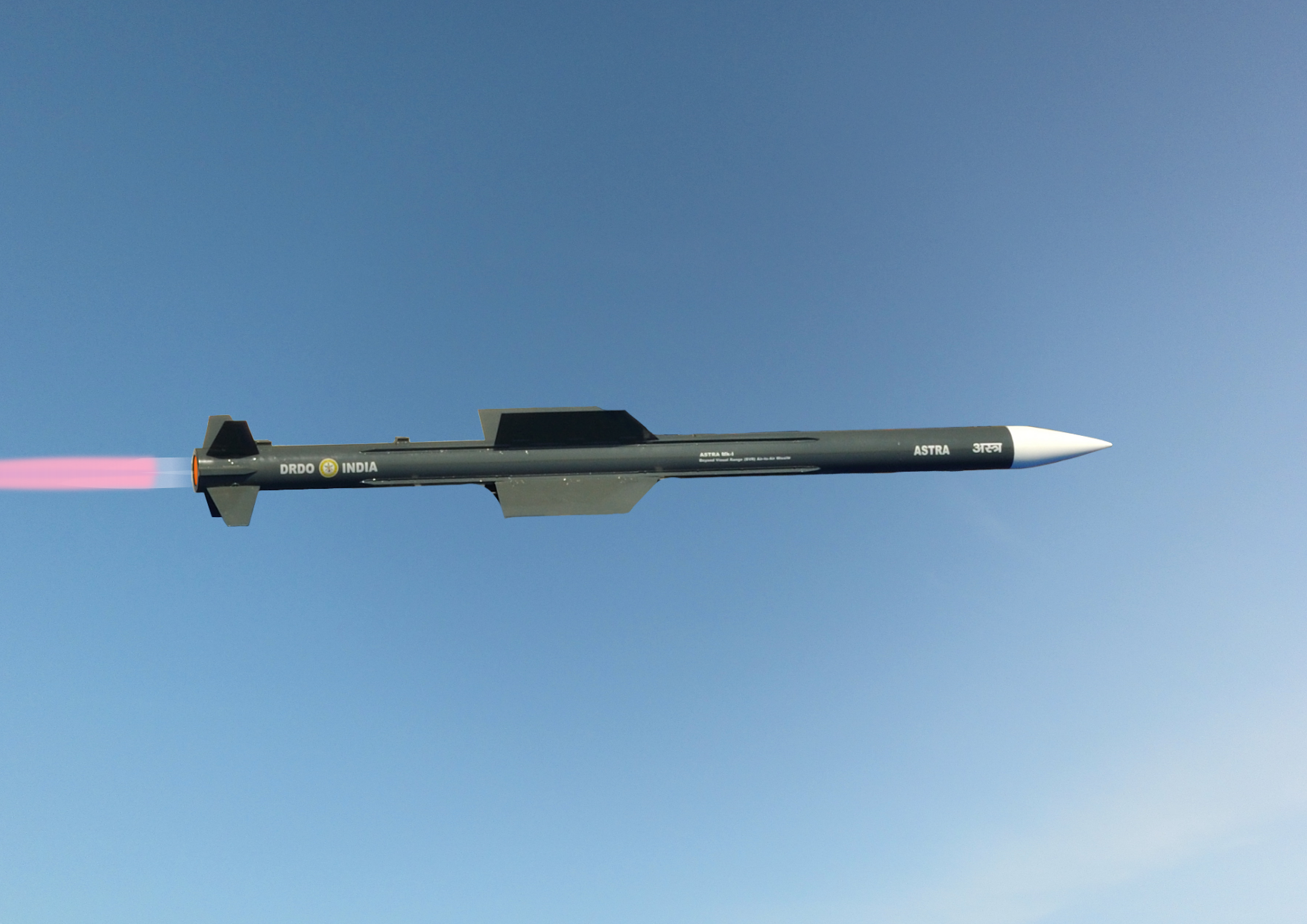
Astra Mark 1 closeup view during flight test.

Astra is series of active radar homing air-to-air missile meant for beyond-visual-range missile combat.

Astra Mk 1 missile has a range of 110 km and is operational with Indian Air Force and Indian Navy. Astra Mk 2 and Astra Mk 3 variants are in testing phase.

=== Ballistic missile ===
==== Pralay ====
It is a solid fuel short range tactical missile under development based on the technology of Pradyumna Ballistic Missile Interceptor. Upon completion of the project, Pralay will replace the older generation liquid fueled Prithvi missile.

==== Surya ====
DRDO started the project of developing an intercontinental ballistic missile, codename Surya in 1994. The information became public in 2010. It will be a three-stage missile with solid and liquid fuel as propellant.

==== K Missile series ====
This is a series of nuclear capable Submarine-launched ballistic missiles including, Sagarika, K4, K5 and K6 missiles designed to be launched from Arihant-class and S5 class SSBN.

===== Sagarika =====
The K-15 Sagarika is a nuclear-capable submarine-launched ballistic missile belonging to the K Missile family with a range of 750 kilometres (466 mi) travelling at hypersonic speed of Mach 7.5. Sagarika can carry a payload of up to 500 kilograms (1,102 lb). Sagarika was developed at the DRDO Missile Complex in Hyderabad.

This missile will form part of the triad in India's nuclear deterrence, and will provide retaliatory nuclear strike capability. The development of this missile (under the title Project K-15) started in 1991. The Indian government first confirmed Sagarika's development seven years later (1998), when the then Defence Minister, George Fernandes, announced it during a press conference.

The development of the underwater missile launcher, known as Project 420 (P420), was completed in 2001 and handed over to the Indian Navy for trials. The missile was successfully test-fired six times, and tested to its full range up to three times. The test of missile from a submerged pontoon was conducted in February 2008.

Sagarika is being integrated with India's nuclear-powered Arihant class submarines that began sea trials on 26 July 2009.

===== K-4 (missile) =====
K-4 is intermediate-range sunbmarine launched missile developed by DRDO for the Indian Navy's Arihant class submarine and future S5-class submarine. The missile has length of 12 metres and diameter of 1.3 metres. It weighs nearly 17 tonnes and can carry a warhead weighing up to 2 tonnes. This missile give capability to strike deep into the enemy territory as it has the range of 3500 km. K4 missile can perform three-dimensional maneuvers and has high accuracy.

Some sources also report that it is a compact version of Agni-III as the Agni-III is nearly 17m in length so it cannot be deployed in the Arihant class submarine.

K-4 has completed all the user trials and ready for induction into the service.

=== Anti-tank guided missile ===
==== SAMHO ====
Developed as an indigenous replacement for LAHAT against heavily armoured vehicle and low flying objects. It can be fired from 120 mm rifled gun on Arjun MBT.

==== MPATGM ====
Man Portable Anti-Tank Guided Missile or MPATGM, is a third generation fire-and-forget anti-tank guided missile derived from Nag project under IGMDP developed by DRDO in collaboration with private sector defence contractor VEM Technologies.

==== SANT ====
A helicopter launched fourth generation ATGM developed from NAG as a stand-off range weapon that comes with dual seeker configuration.

=== Cruise missile ===
==== Brahmos ====
Launched as a joint venture between India's DRDO and the Russian NPO, the BrahMos programme aims at creating a range of missile systems derived from the Yakhont missile system. Named the "BrahMos" after the Brahmaputra and the Moskva rivers, the project has been highly successful.

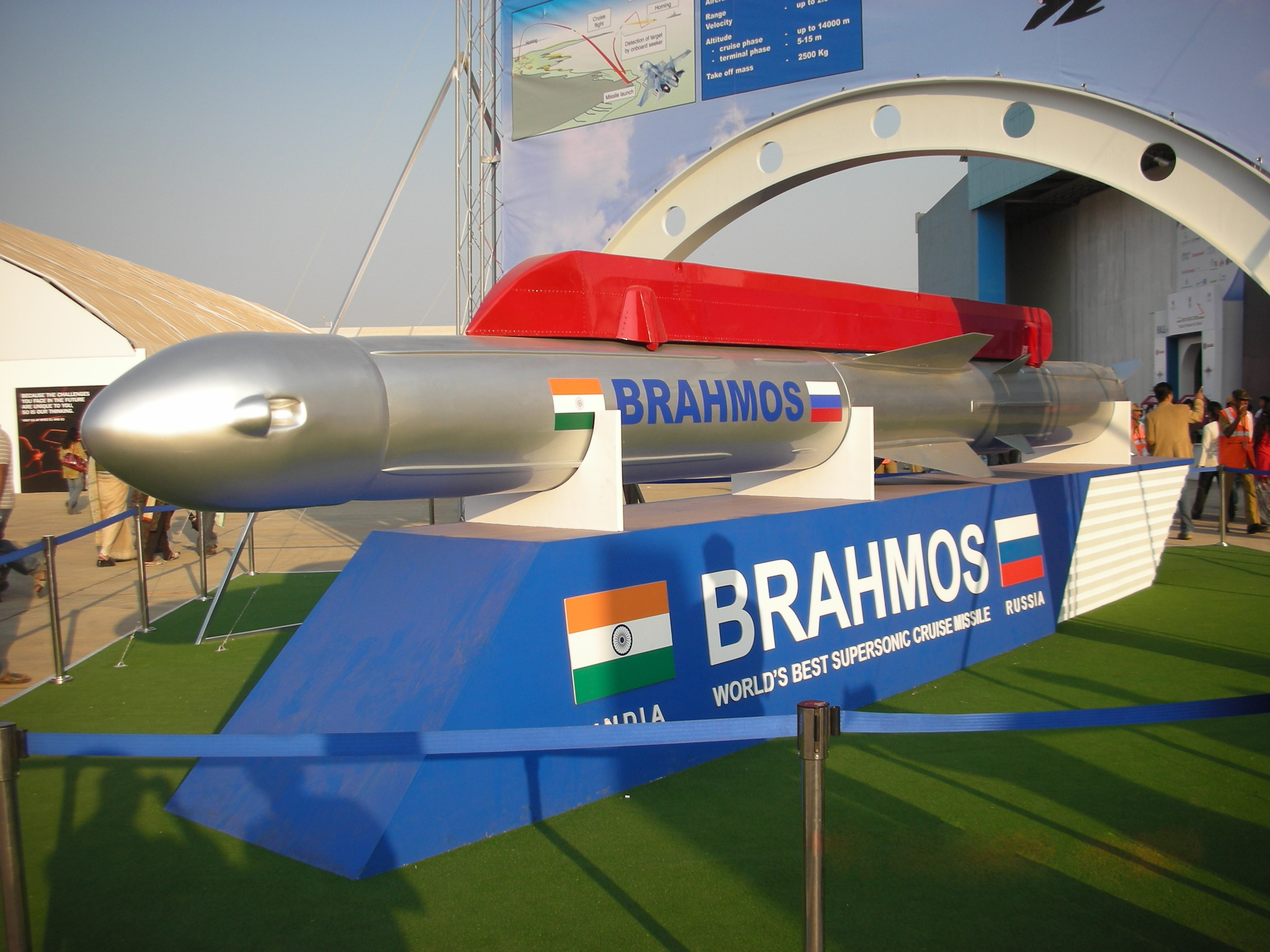
BrahMos

The Indian Navy has ordered the BrahMos Naval version, both slant-launched and vertically launched, for its ships; the Indian Army has ordered two regiments worth of land-launched missiles for long-range strike; and an air-launched version is in development for the Indian Air Force's Su-30 MKIs and the Navy's Tu-142 long-range aircraft.

The DRDO has been responsible for the navigational systems on the BrahMos, aspects of its propulsion, airframe and seeker, plus its Fire Control Systems, Mobile Command posts and Transporter Erector Launcher.

An upgraded version of the 290 km-range BrahMos supersonic cruise missile was successfully test-fired by India on 2 December 2010 from Integrated Test Range (ITR) at Chandipur off the Odisha coast.

"Block III version of BrahMos with advanced guidance and upgraded software, incorporating high manoeuvres at multiple points and steep dive from high altitude was flight tested successfully from Launch Complex III of ITR," its Director S P Dash said after the test-firing from a mobile launcher at 1100 hours. The 8.4-metre missile which can fly at 2.8 times the speed of sound is capable of carrying conventional warheads of up to 300 kg for a range of 290 km.

It can effectively engage ground targets from an altitude as low as ten metres for surgical strikes at terror training camps across the border without causing collateral damage. BrahMos is capable of being launched from multiple platforms like submarine, ship, aircraft and land based Mobile Autonomous Launchers (MAL). The Block III BrahMos has the capability of scaling mountain terrain and can play a vital role in precision strike in the northern territories. The advanced cruise missile can fly close to the rough geographies and kill the target A five-year development timeframe is anticipated.

The hypersonic Brahmos 2 is to be developed as a follow on to the original Brahmos. The missile would fly at speeds of 5-7 Mach.

==== Nirbhay ====
Nirbhay is a long range, all-weather, subsonic cruise missile powered by solid rocket booster and turbofan or a turbojet engine that can be launched from multiple platforms and is capable of carrying conventional and nuclear warheads. The missile is guided by an inertial navigation system and a radio altimeter for the height determination. It carries a Ring Laser Gyroscope (RLG) based guidance, control and navigation system with additional MEMS based Inertial Navigation System (INS) along with radiodetermination-satellite service GPS/NAVIC. With a range of about 1000 km, Nirbhay is capable of delivering 24 different types of warheads depending on mission requirements.

=== Hypersonic weapons development ===
In order to create advanced hypersonic missiles domestically, the DRDO is working on Project Vishnu. DRDO will produce twelve different types of hypersonic missile systems for attack, and interception capability. Before 2030, DRDO wants to build hypersonic glide vehicles.

==== Shaurya ====
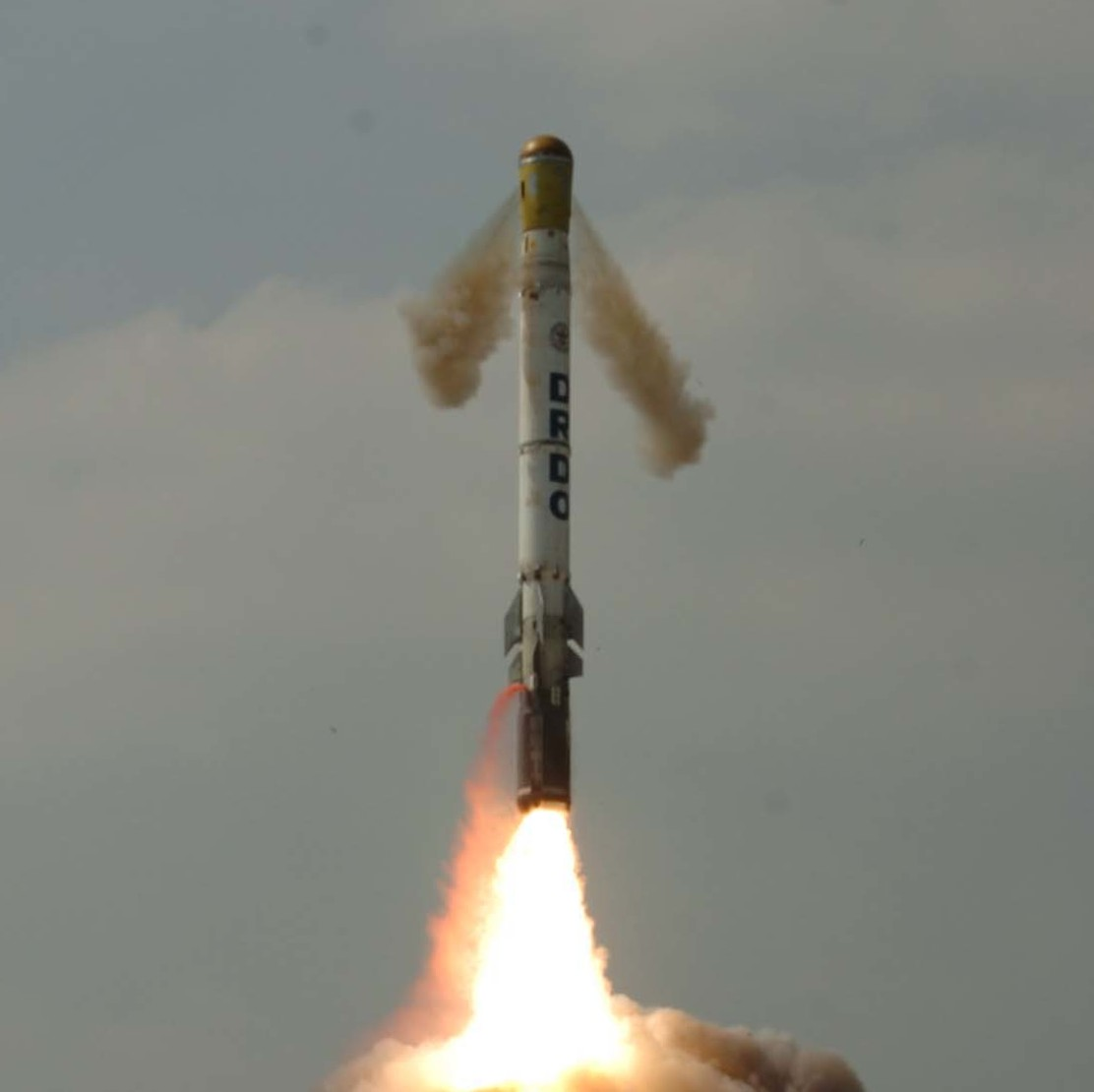
Underground silo launched surface-to-surface missile Shaurya from ITR Balasore.

The Shaurya (Valor) is a canister-launched hypersonic surface-to-surface tactical missile developed by the Indian Defence Research and Development Organisation (DRDO) for use by the Indian Armed Forces. Similar to the BrahMos, Shaurya is stored in composite canisters, which makes it much easier to store for long periods without maintenance as well as to handle and transport. It also houses the gas generator to eject the missile from the canister before its solid propellant motors take over to hurl it at the intended target.

Shaurya missiles can remain hidden or camouflaged in underground silos from enemy surveillance or satellites till they are fired from the special storage-cum-launch canisters. The Shaurya system will require some more tests before it becomes fully operational in two to three years. Moreover, defence scientists say the high-speed, two-stage Shaurya has high maneuverability which also makes it less vulnerable to existing anti-missile defence systems.

It can be easily transported by road. The missile, encased in a canister, is mounted on a single vehicle, which has only a driver's cabin, and the vehicle itself is the launch platform. This "single vehicle solution" reduces its signature – it cannot be easily detected by satellites – and makes its deployment easy. The gas generator, located at the bottom of the canister produces high pressure gas, which expands and ejects the missile from the tube.

The centrepiece of a host of new technologies incorporated in Shaurya is its ring laser gyroscope (RLG) and accelerometer. The indigenous ring laser gyroscope, a navigation and guidance system developed by the Research Centre Imarat (RCI) based in Hyderabad is a highly classified technology.

In test flights the RLG functioned exceptionally well. the RLG monitors the missile's position in space when it is flying. The missile's on-board computer will use this information and compare it with the desired position. Based on the difference between the missile's actual and desired positions, the computer will decide the optimum path and the actuators will command the missile to fly in its desired/targeted position. The third test of the RLG was successful on 24 September 2011, reaching a speed of 7.5 mach. It is now ready for production.

==== Long Range Anti-Ship Missile (LRAShM) ====
The Long Range – Anti Ship Missile (LRAShM) is a boost-glide hypersonic missile being developed by the Defence Research and Development Organisation for the Indian Navy. The missile can be fired from a shore-based transporter erector launcher (TEL) and is currently undergoing developmental trials. It is the first hypersonic weapon platform that has been developed and deployed by the Indian Armed Forces, with a stated objectives of coastal defence and long-range maritime strike roles with the Indian Navy.

==== Hypersonic Technology Demonstrator Vehicle (HSTDV) ====
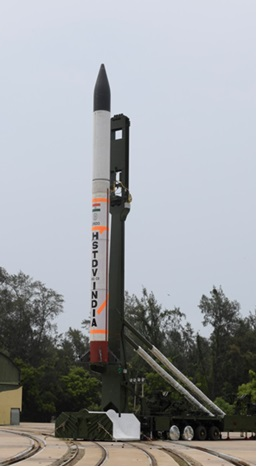
HSTDV mounted on solid booster stage, erected vertical at launch site

An unmanned scramjet demonstration aircraft to attain hypersonic speed flight that will also act as carrier vehicle for future hypersonic and long-range cruise missiles. It will include multiple spinoff in civilian applications including the launching of satellites at lower cost.

==== BM-04 ====
A full-scale model of the new BM-04 short-range ballistic missile was unveiled at the Vigyan Vaibhav defense exhibition in Hyderabad on March 5, 2025. The BM-04, a derivative of the Agni-P, was developed in 2024 to neutralize anti-access/area denial (A2/AD) capabilities and guarantee that India's defense forces had no operational limitations in a heavily disputed battlefield. The aim is to satisfy the Indian Armed Forces' need for a conventional ballistic missile with a range of 1,500 kilometers for the proposed Integrated Rocket Force. BM-04 is capable of reaching hypersonic speeds of Mach 5 and higher.

BM-04 is 10.2 meters long, 1.2 meters in diameter, and weighs 11,500 kg. Launched from a six-axle Tatra transporter erector launcher, the missile can travel between 400 and 1,500 km with a conventional warhead weighing 500 kg. It makes use of NavIC and GPS augmented inertial navigation system. The circular error probable is under 30 meters.

The BM-04's two-stage solid propulsion system includes a re-entry vehicle positioned atop a sizable boost stage. The body of the re-entry vehicle is conical in shape, and its base diameter is marginally less than the booster stage's diameter. The BM-04 and Agni-I share a similar appearance, although the BM-04 has a smaller conventional payload and two stages of propulsion. Similar to the American Long-Range Hypersonic Weapon system, the BM-04 uses a boostglide vehicle concept.

==== ET-LDHCM ====
It is a long range hypersonic cruise missile being developed by the DRDO in collaboration with the Indian private sector. ET-LDHCM is one among the twelve distinct hypersonic systems under Project Vishnu, that DRDO is working on for offensive and defensive role.

=== Ballistic Missile Defence Programme ===
Unveiled in 2006, the ABM project was a surprise to many observers. While DRDO had revealed some details about the project over the years, its progress had been marked by strict secrecy, and the project itself was unlisted, and not visible among DRDO's other programmes. The ABM project has benefited from all the incremental improvements achieved by the DRDO and its associated industrial partners via the long-running and often contentious Akash missile and Trishul missile programmes. However, it is a completely new programme, with much larger scope and with predominantly new subsystems.

The ABM project has two missiles—namely the AAD (Advanced Air Defence) and PAD (Prithvi Air Defence) missiles. The former is an endo-atmospheric interceptor of new design, which can intercept targets to a height of 30 km (19 mi). Whereas the latter is a modified Prithvi missile, dubbed the Axo-atmospheric interceptor (AXO) with a dedicated second stage kill vehicle for ballistic missile interception, up to an altitude of 80 km (50 mi). Both these missiles are cued by an active phased array Long Range Tracking Radar, similar to the Elta GreenPine but made with locally developed components, which include DRDO-developed transmit/receive modules. The ABM system also makes use of a second radar, known as the Multi-Function Control Radar which assists the LRTR in classifying the target, and can also act as the fire control radar for the AAD missile. The MFCR, like the LRTR, is an active phased array system.

The entire system was tested in November 2006, under the Prithvi Air Defence Exercise, when a prototype AXO missile intercepted another Prithvi missile at a height of 50 km (31 mi). This test was preceded by an "electronic test" in which an actual target missile was launched, but the entire interceptor system was tested electronically, albeit no actual interceptor was launched. This test was successful in its entirety. The AAD Missile was tested in December 2007 which successfully intercepted a modified Prithvi missile simulating the M-9 and M-11 class of ballistic missiles. Interception happened at an altitude of 15 km (9 mi).

==== Anti-satellite weapon ====
After testing the over 5,000 km Agni V missile, which went up to 600 km into space during its parabolic trajectory, the Defence Research and Development Organisation (DRDO) now feels it can fashion deadly anti-satellite (ASAT) weapons in double-quick time. Agni V gives you the boosting capability and the 'kill vehicle', with advanced seekers, will be able to home into the target satellite, DRDO chief, VK Saraswat said. The defence ministry in 2010 had even drafted a 15-year "Technology Perspective and Roadmap", which held development of ASAT weapons "for electronic or physical destruction of satellites in both LEO (2,000-km altitude above earth's surface) and the higher geosynchronous orbit" as a thrust area in its long-term integrated perspective plan under the management of DRDO. Consequently, defence scientists are focusing on "space security" to protect India's space assets from electronic or physical destruction. Another spin-off from Agni V test is that the DRDO feels it can work towards launching mini-satellites for battlefield use if an adversary attacks the country's main satellites. On 27 March 2019, India conducted a successful Anti-satellite missile test from Dr A P J Abdul Kalam Island in Odisha.

=== Under development ===
==== Ballistic missile ====
===== Prahaar =====
Prahaar is a solid-fueled surface-to-surface guided short-range tactical ballistic missile developed by DRDO of India. It would be equipped with omni-directional warheads and could be used for hitting both tactical and strategic targets. It has a range of about 150 km. It was successfully test-fired on 21 July 2011 from the Integrated Test Range (ITR) at Chandipur.

====== Pranash ======
Pranash is an extended range cariant of Prahaar missile being developed by. It is developing a 200 km range single stage solid fuel missile that can carry conventional warhead for battlefield use. The testing phase of the new missile will start from 2021.

===== K-5 missile =====
K-5 missile is intercontinental-range submarine launched missile being developed by DRDO. It will have the range of 5000 km and will carry the warhead of 2 tonnes. It will be solid-fuelled. It will be ready for test in 2022. K-5 will be fastest missile in his family.

===== K-6 missile =====
K-6 missile is intercontinental-range submarine launched missile being developed by DRDO. It will have a range of 6000–8000 km. It will also carry the payload of 2 tonnes. It will enable the Navy's submarine to aim at any country while patrolling in the "safe haven".

==== Cruise missile ====
===== Submarine Launched Cruise Missile (SLCM) =====
The Submarine Launched Cruise Missile (SLCM) is a missile designed to launch from torpedo tubes of submarines. It is a compact version of Nirbhay missile. It has a stated range of 500 km, with a cruise length of 5.6 meter, diameter of 0.505 meter, all up weight of 975 kg and Mach 0.7 speed. It would feature INS/GPS navigation, with an RF seeker for terminal guidance. It comes with two variants: a Land attack cruise missile (LACM) and Anti-Ship Cruise Missile (ASCM).

===== Long Range-Land Attack Cruise Missile (LR-LACM) =====
The LR-LACM, a longer range variant, will have a range up to 1,500 km. This missile would be operated by both the Indian Navy and Indian Air Force when development is complete. This missile would be compatible with the Universal Vertical Launch Module (UVLM) cells used for BrahMos. The missile received Acceptance of Necessity (AoN) from Defence Acquisition Council (DAC) in August 2023. It will weigh a tonne, have a length of 6 m and diameter of 0.52 m. The missile is designed to have two tapering-chord fold-out wings with a span of 2.7 m. The missile would be equipped with Small Turbofan Engines (STFEs), upgraded radio frequency (RF) seekers, and other subsystems.

==== Air to Air missile ====
===== Solid Fuel Ducted Ramjet (SFDR) =====
From year 2010 onwards, Defence Research and Development Organisation (DRDO) started working on critical technologies for future longer range air-to-air missile that can also be used in surface-to-air missile systems. Solid Fuel Ducted Ramjet (SFDR) is one such missile propulsion technology that uses thrust modulated ducted rocket with a reduced smoke nozzle-less missile booster.

==== Anti-radiation missile ====
===== Rudram series =====
NGARM (New Generation Anti-Radiation Missile) now officially called Rudram is a series of air-to-surface, anti-radiation missile of range 150, 300 and 550 km respectively. These are meant to provide air superiority, tactical capability to Indian Air Force for suppression of enemy air defenses (SEAD), that can be launched from a range of altitudes.

==== Surface-to-air missile ====
===== Project Kusha =====
DRDO is developing a series long range surface to air missile to supplement Barak-8 and S-400 systems for its multi-tier air defence umbrella protecting the Indian airspace. It will use some of the key technologies developed during Ballistic Missile Defence Programme.

===== Akash-NG =====
Akash-NG is new generation of Akash missile developed by DRDO. The missile uses a Ku-band Active radar seeker, an active electronically scanned array Multi-Function Radar (MFR) and optical proximity fuse will improve the effectiveness of the missile against targets with low radar cross-section. It is the successor of Akash missile and has range of 80 km.

===== QRSAM =====
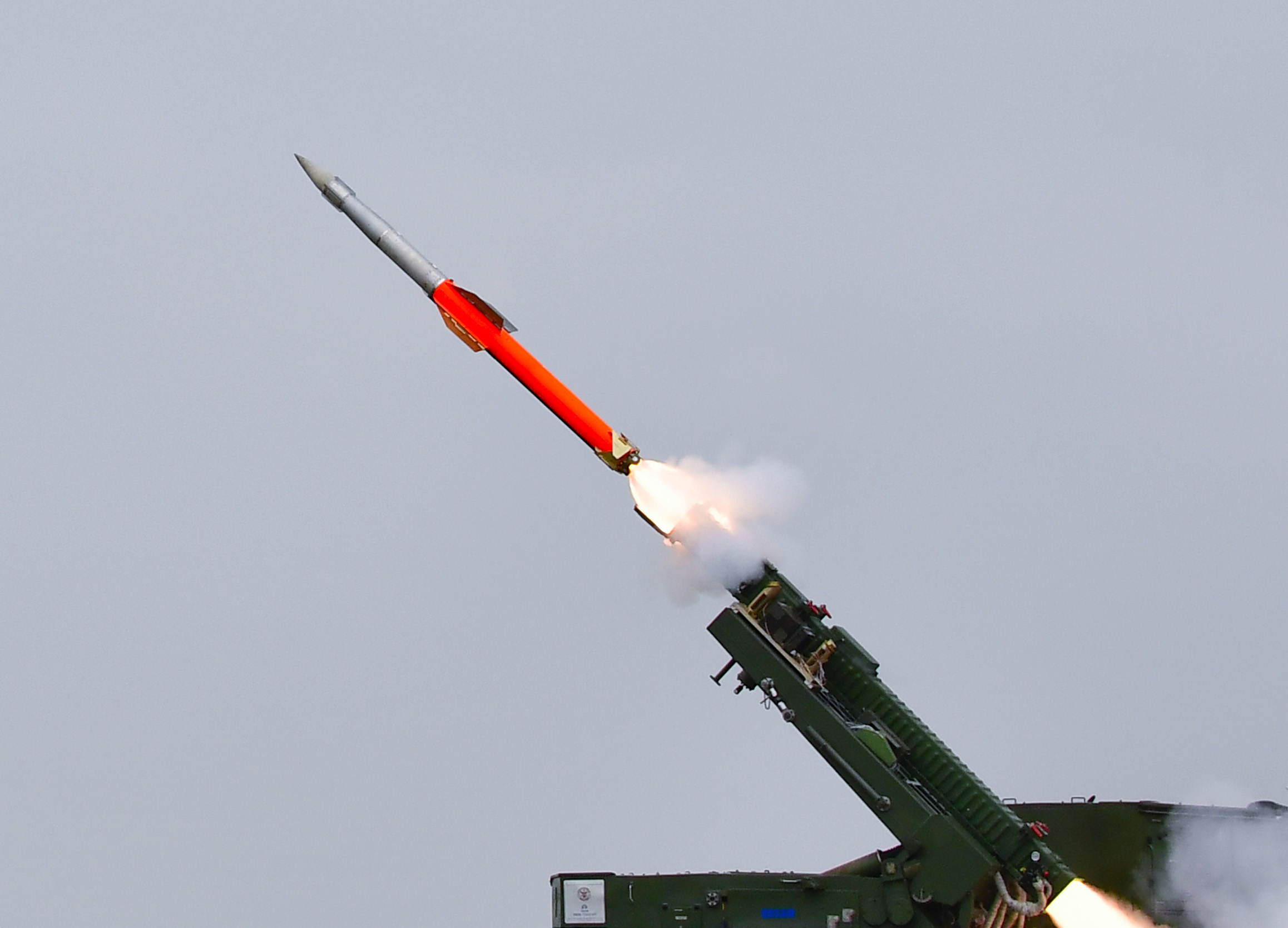
Quick Reaction Surface to Air Missile (QRSAM)

DRDO developed QRSAM as part of replacement program for the Soviet era 9K33 Osa and 2K12 Kub that is being used extensively by Indian Army and Indian Air Force. It is built for an all weather, all terrain scenario with electronic counter-countermeasure system against aerial targets. It has an engagement range of minimum 3 km to a maximum of 30 km that is powered by solid fuel propellant, maintaining a speed of 4.7 Mach in flight. The missile system uses a two way data link communication with active radar homing.

===== VL-SRSAM =====
Vertical launched-Short Range Surface- to-Air Missile (VL-SRSAM) is a quick reaction short range missile being developed by DRDO for naval service and to replace Barak 1 missile. The missile is naval variant of Astra with some design and technological changes for an all weather point and area defence role against flying targets such as fighter aircraft, unmanned aerial vehicles etc. It has the range of 45 km.

===== VSHORAD =====
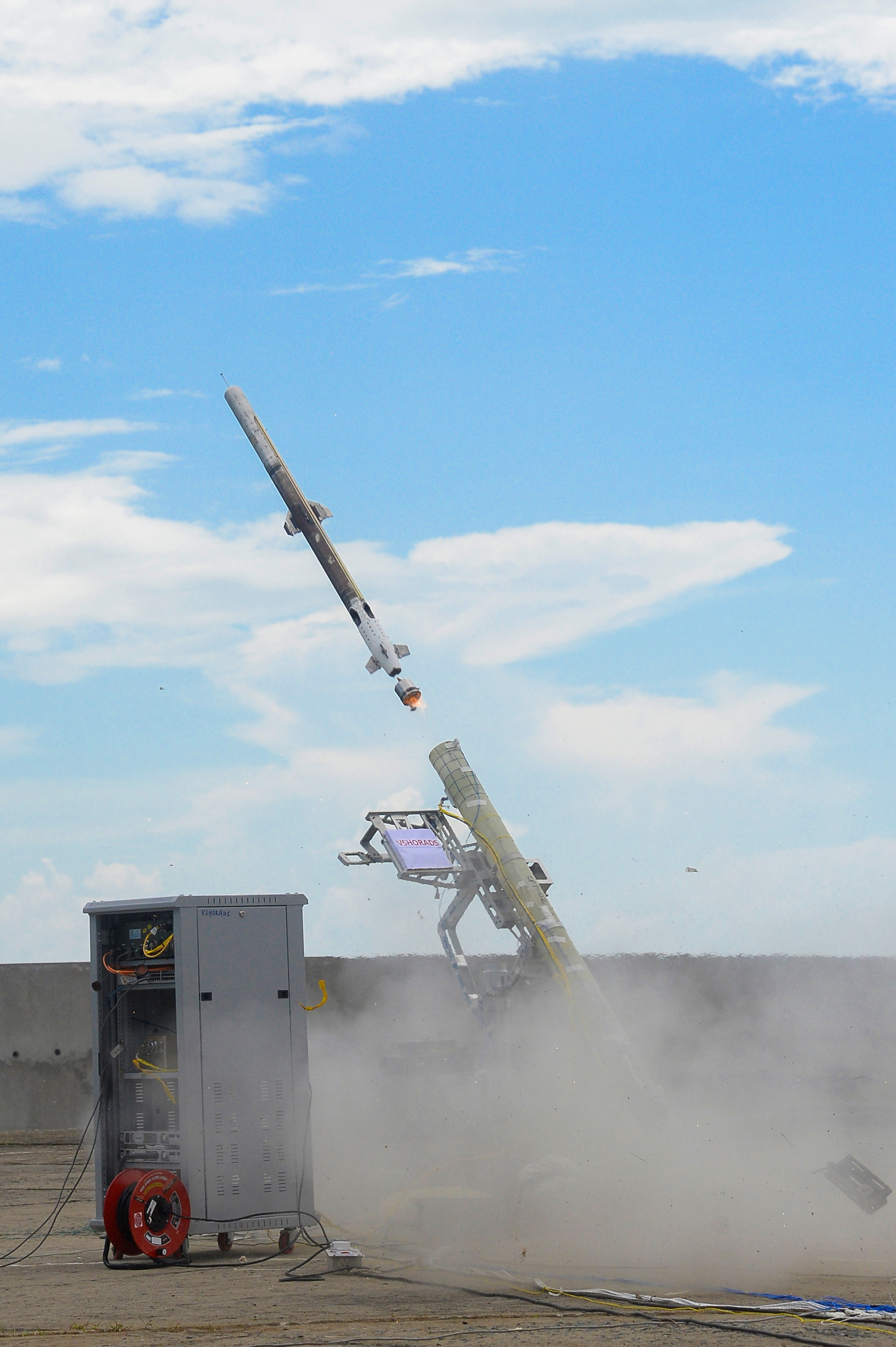
Maiden launch of VSHORADS.

VSHORADS or Very Short Range Air Defence System is a man portable air defence system (MANPAD) meant for neutralizing low altitude aerial threats at short ranges. The missile uses solid fuel based dual-thrust rocket motor and is developed by Research Centre Imarat . On 27 September 2022, DRDO conducted two successful launches from Integrated Test Range, Chandipur. To increase mid-air maneuverability, the missile is equipped with miniaturized Reaction Control System (RCS).

==== Naval Anti-Ship Missile (NASM) ====
===== NASM SR =====
The project is sanctioned in 2017 for a 5–55 km short range air-launched Naval Anti-Ship Missile (NASM–SR) to replace Sea Eagle missiles in use by the Indian Navy with future variants ranged in excess of 150 km.

===== NASM MR =====
Naval Anti-Ship Missile–Medium Range is an anti-ship missile being developed by the Defence Research and Development Organisation for the Indian Navy. It is the second indigenous anti-ship cruise missile developed for the Indian Navy. DRDO has been given permission to develop an indigenously developed anti-ship missile known as the Naval Anti-ship Missile-Medium range (NASM-MR), which is a significant step toward self-reliance in niche missile technology

== Precision-guided munition ==
=== Sudarshan laser-guided bomb ===
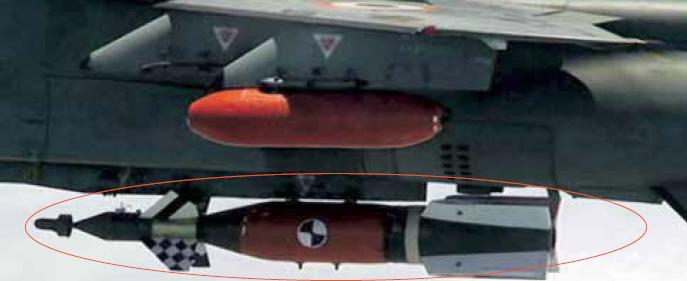
Sudarshan Laser guided bomb

India's first laser-guided bomb, Sudarshan is the latest weapon system developed indigenously to occupy the niche of a precision delivery mechanism. It can be fitted to a 450 kilograms (990 lb) gravity bomb and can guide it to the target using lasers with a CEP (Circular Error Probability) of 10 metres.

=== DRDO Glide Bombs ===
Garuthmaa & Garudaa are DRDO's 1000 kg Glide Bombs. These are India's first indigenously designed glide bomb with a range of 30 km (Garudaa) to 100 km (Garuthmaa).

=== Smart Anti-Airfield Weapon (SAAW) ===
Smart Anti-Airfield Weapon (SAAW) is a long-range precision-guided anti-airfield weapon engaging ground targets with high precision up to a range of 100 kilometres.

=== High Speed Low Drag Bomb (HSLD) ===
This is a family of both guided and unguided munition developed by the Armament Research and Development Establishment (ARDE) for the new generation Indian, NATO and Russian origin aircraft.

== Future Plans ==
=== AVATAR ===
Aerobic Vehicle for Transatmospheric Hypersonic Aerospace Transportation also known as AVATAR is a DRDO concept for a robotic single-stage reusable spaceplane capable of horizontal takeoff and landing, that can be used for space launches of low cost military and commercial satellite.

=== GATET engine ===
The Defence Research and Development Organisation (DRDO) has launched a ₹100 crore (US$10.7 million) project in R&D in the area of gas turbines, a DRDO official said in April 2010. Under the initiative of DRDO's Aeronautics Research and Development Board, R&D projects, which need investment in the region of ₹50 lakh (US$53,415.00) to ₹5 crore (US$534,150.00), would be considered for funding. GTRE was the nodal agency to spearhead this venture, called GATET

=== Communication-Centric Intelligence Satellite (CCI-Sat) ===
Communication-Centric Intelligence Satellite is an advanced reconnaissance satellite, being developed by DRDO. It will be India's first officially declared spy satellite and according to ISRO it should be in the sky by 2014. This satellite will help Indian intelligence agencies to significantly boost surveillance of terror camps in neighbouring countries.

=== Underwater-launched unmanned aerial vehicle (ULUAV) ===
Sagar Defence Engineering received a contract for this project from the DRDO. The goal is to create ULUAVs that can land on another moving vehicle and launch from a submarine and function independently. In order to gather data, it will also be outfitted with sensors, sonar, and cameras. The ULUAV will be able to be launched swiftly, safely, and independently from a moving submarine. It will also have a vast range and great endurance. The Defence Research and Development Laboratory will serve as a partner lab, while the DRDO Technology Development Fund will provide funding for the project. Separately, NewSpace Research and Technologies in collaboration with Larsen & Toubro are also working on a comparable system. The ULUAV will be employed for intelligence, surveillance, and reconnaissance (ISR) missions and radio relays in anti-access/area-denial (A2/AD) situations by smoothly integrating with the current naval fleet.

=== NavIC Network Timing System ===
In accordance with the range requirements for NavIC for both military and commercial applications, Defence Research and Development Organisation, through the Technology Development Fund scheme, has commissioned Accord Software and Systems, to build a tailored and flexible IRNSS Network Timing system domestically. Using NavIC data, the receiver chip will obtain and distribute Indian time for navigation. India currently depends on the US for this service.

=== Mission Sudarshan Chakra ===
In August 2025, a national defense initiative was unveiled with the goal of creating an AI-enabled, multi-layered, multi-domain defense shield with offensive capabilities by 2035 to defend India from contemporary threats.

=== Wing Morphing ===
In 2025, a biomimetic technology program funded by the DRDO successfully demonstrated changing wing behavior on a flight platform. By modifying camber in real time to enhance lift and control, DRDO was able to achieve 6°-angle in leading edge droop. Dynamic morphing hardware that can modify its geometry in real time while in flight has been validated. It can be used for future fighters like AMCA as well as UAVs.

DRDO used lightweight, intelligent shape-memory alloys in place of hydraulic or electromechanical actuators. National Aerospace Laboratories created the morphing wing section, which features leading edge that is sliced diagonally at a 45°-angle. When the SMA actuators contract, it allows the forward part of the wing to droop smoothly, changing the camber into a more maneuver-optimized or lift-efficient shape. The surface reverts to its low-drag cruising shape when the SMA cools. The surface shifts without the gaps, discontinuities, or exposed hinges of conventional control surfaces.

The radar-reflective edges of flaps and slats are avoided by continuous shaping. The technology will help understand continuous-surface flight control, one of the requirements for sixth-generation aircraft design. The morphing section can change shape at 35°-per second, even with complete propwash, mimicking actual flying conditions, according to demonstrations conducted on a 300 mm-span micro air vehicle. According to DRDO, the wing takes 0.17 seconds to reach the desired shape when instructed to drop from zero to maximum. Even when the propeller is creating airflow, it can monitor sinusoidal form changes at a rate of one cycle per second.

The power allocation algorithm that controls SMA actuation is one of the significant advancements. Electrical power is distributed effectively across the morphing segments via an adaptive control allocation technique designed by DRDO. It doubles actuation speed without adding to the strain on the onboard battery by dynamically sharing power among several wing parts. The system's operational feasibility is demonstrated by the 5.6% average increase in energy consumption required during full airflow loading. The architecture is lightweight enough for distributed morphing systems on bigger wings, where dozens of segments may be employed simultaneously, as well as small UAVs, with only 6 grams of electronics per segment.

=== Nano Stealth Coating ===
Research on a sophisticated radar-absorbing coating that could render fighter aircraft almost untraceable is under progress as of 2025. The Nano Stealth Coating will use atom-thin metamaterials to manipulate visual, acoustic, and electromagnetic signatures. By bending radar signals, dispersing infrared emissions, and even reducing engine noise, the coating-layered nanostructures can be adjusted via electric fields. In contrast to conventional radar-absorbent materials, which increase weight and deteriorate over time due to stress, self-heal nano-coatings can maintain structural integrity, provide broadband absorption from X-band radars to millimeter-wave seekers and are perfect for thwarting quantum-enhanced sensors.

=== Fly-By-Light System ===
For near-instantaneous response times and immunity to electromagnetic interference, the fly-by-light or fly-by-optics systems will use optical fiber connections to communicate flight commands via light pulses. The conventional electrical wiring seen in fly-by-wire aircraft like HAL Tejas will be replaced by this system. In disputed electromagnetic situations, it increases survivability, lowers signal delay, and improves response time. The fly-by-light architectures offer a robust infrastructure that allows next-generation aircraft computers, sensors, and weapons to securely connect in contested war zones where jamming and cyberattacks are frequent.
