= DRDO Abhyas =

Aerial target drone

Abhyas
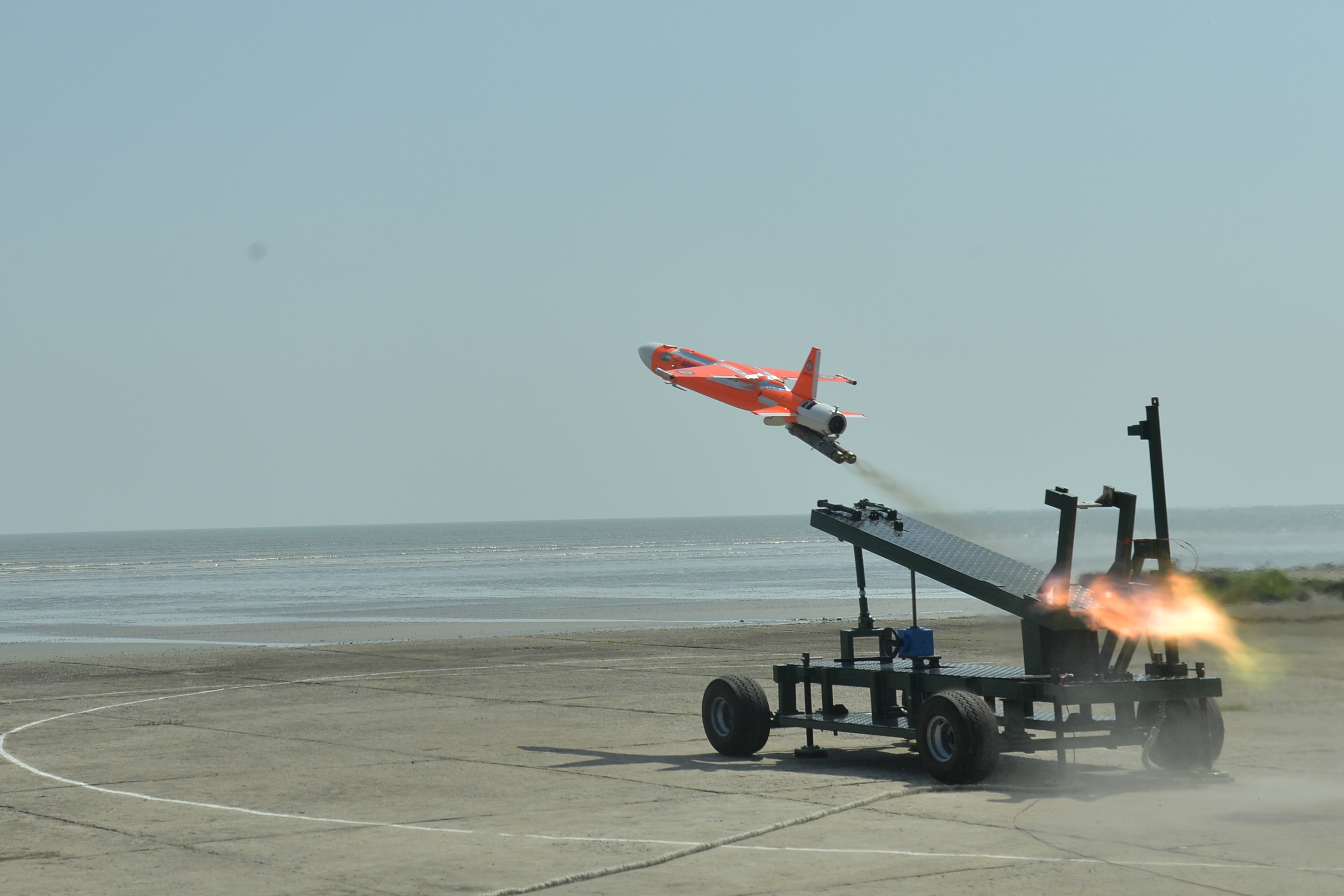
- DRDO Abhyas flight test from Interim Test Range, Chandipur in 2019

General information
- Type: Target Drone
- National origin: India
- Manufacturer: Hindustan Aeronautics Limited Larsen and Toubro
- Designer: Aeronautical Development Establishment

History
- First flight: 23 June 2012

The DRDO Abhyas (Literally Practice in Sanskrit) is a high-speed expendable aerial target being built by the Aeronautical Development Establishment (ADE) of the Defence Research and Development Organisation (DRDO) for the Indian Armed Forces.

== Development ==
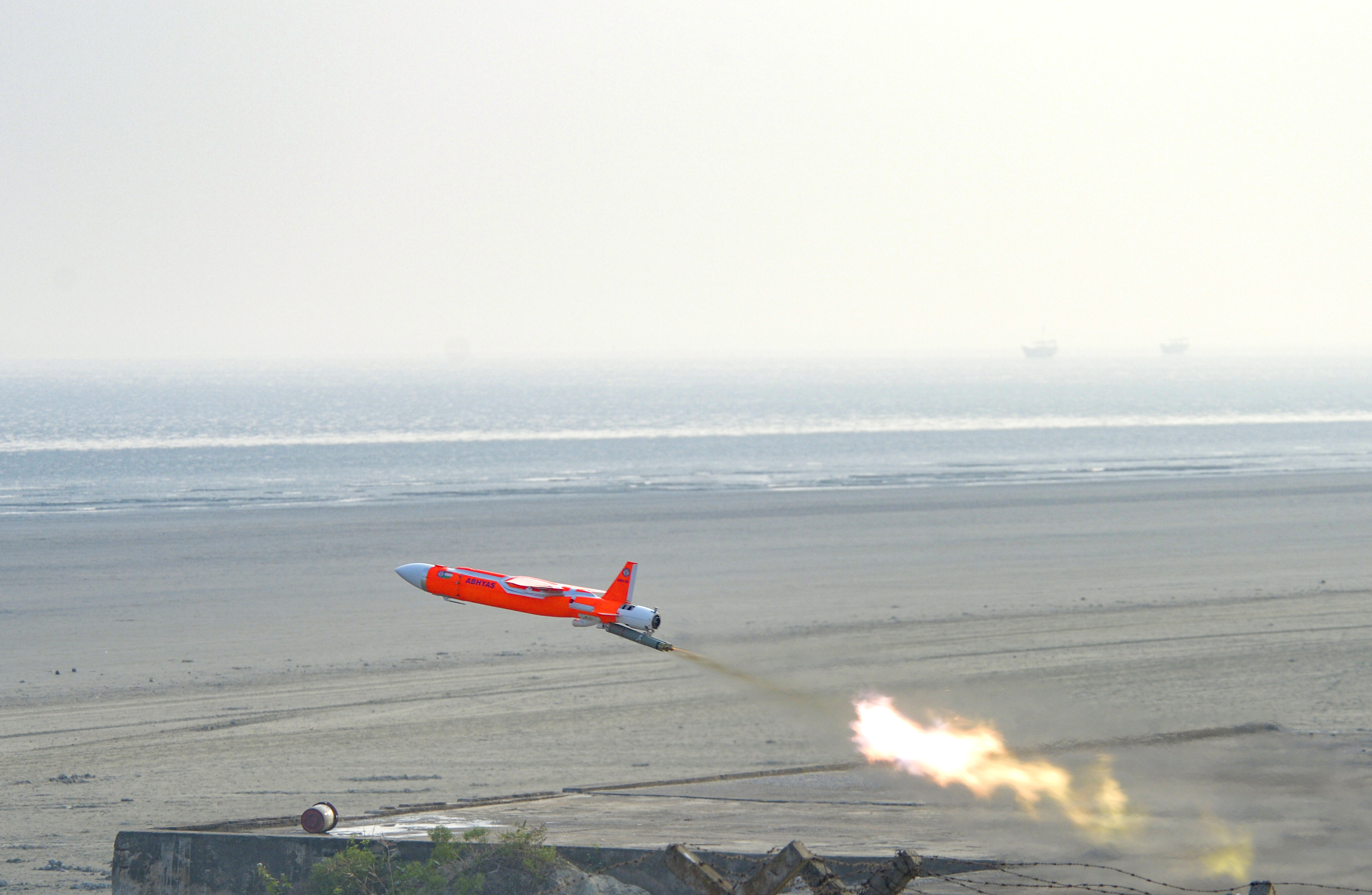
DRDO Abhyas test flight on 23 December 2021.

As of January 2013, the proof of concept and pre-project trials were completed. The first experimental launch without the main turbojet engine of the Abhyas was held at the Chitradurga Aeronautical Test Range on 23 June 2012 to check the launch and configuration capability. The gas turbine engine has been identified and integrated on the Abhyas airframe and its test run with the aircraft fuel system and s-airtake has been completed. The project was sanctioned with an initial DRDO funding of ₹15 crore. Aeronautical Development Establishment (ADE) will carry out 15 technology demonstrators (TDs) till 2015. After the acceptance of the prototypes or TDs by the Indian Armed Forces, serial production will start. The Indian Defense Services have also revealed a combined global tender projecting the requirement of 225 HEAT drones. Abhyas can be used as aerial target for missile systems. DRDO successfully test fired Abhyas from Integrated Test Range, Odisha on 13 May 2019. The test was conducted to check low altitude flight capability with radar altimeter in loop demonstration in autonomous flight mode.

On 23 December 2021, DRDO successfully flight tested Abhyas from Chitradurga Aeronautical Test Range. A locally developed data link was proved along with demonstration of high subsonic speed trajectory at a very low altitude and long endurance. Abhyas uses MEMS gyroscope based inertial navigation system for guidance and a flight control computer linked to ground station for autonomous operation.

On 27 June 2024, six consecutive tests of Abhyas was carried out. After these, a total of 10 tests were performed. The trails were carried out with a system of improved radar cross section and visual and infrared augmentation systems. The trials also validated the safe release of booster, launcher clearance, and endurance performance. The booster was developed by Advanced Systems Laboratory. After the tests, Abhyas was declared production-ready.

=== Manufacturing ===
HAL on 17 December 2021, secured order for manufacturing, assembly, integration, testing and supply of DRDO Abhyas from ADE. The order will be completed under Development-cum-Production Partner (DcPP) with a private sector industry. This order marked the beginning of series production of the platform. The per unit cost of DRDO Abhyas including the launcher is ₹40 lakh. HAL at DefExpo-2022 received Development cum Production Partner (DcPP) / Production Agency (PA) certificate for ABHYAS from DRDO on 20 October 2022.

== Design ==
The fuselage for the Abhyas was designed by adopting the DRDO Lakshya tow body. The fuselage consists of five sections, namely the nose cone, equipment bay, fuel tank bay, air intake bay and tail cone. The material for the nose and tail cones are made up of Glass Fiber Reinforced Polymer (GFRP), whereas the material of the equipment bay, air intake bay and fuel tank are made up of an aluminum steel alloy. The wings and tail plane of the Abhyas have been derived from the Lakshya by downsizing them, however the wings of the Abhyas are positioned on the upper-side of the body whereas the Lakshya has under-body wings. For propulsion it is fitted with a gas-turbine engine weighing 19 kg, having a thrust of 25 kg, with an endurance of 30–45 minutes that can cover distance of 400 km. Abhyas is GPS-enabled, has an on-board flight control computer and a miss-distance indicator. It is also designed for autonomous flight with the help of an autopilot. The radar cross section is increased 50 times to emulate a fighter aircraft.

=== Flight Profile ===
DRDO Abhyas launched from Chitradurga Aeronautical Test Range.

The Abhyas is launched from a mobile launcher with the help of two 68 mm booster rockets manufactured by Munitions India Limited (previously Ordnance Factory Board). The twin rocket boosters helps in providing the initial acceleration until the small turbojet engine starts to sustain high subsonic speed. At the end of its launch phase the burnout booster rockets are jettisoned. Thereafter, the main gas-turbine engine powers the vehicle during cruise phase. Abhyas can fly at speed of 180 meter per second and cover 5 km altitude.

==== Flight testing ====
DRDO conducted successful flight test of ABHYAS- High-speed Expendable Aerial Target (HEAT) from ITR Balasore in Odisha on 22 September 2020. Two demonstrator vehicles were successfully test flown. During this test, Abhyas cleared all the parameters of evaluation set by the Indian Armed Forces which included 5 km flying altitude, vehicle speed of 0.5 mach, endurance level of 30 minutes and 2G turn capability.

Four ABHYAS flight trials were executed successfully by DRDO from the Chandipur Integrated Test Range (ITR) in cooperation with Larsen & Toubro (L&T) and Hindustan Aeronautics Limited (HAL). The tests were conducted from 30 January to 2 February 2024, with the goal of utilizing a redesigned robust configuration to accomplish four distinct mission objectives. Launch acceleration was lowered by the Advanced Systems Laboratory's single booster. The goals—achieving the necessary end-of-launch velocity, clearing the launcher, and safely releasing the booster—were all accomplished. Numerous characteristics, including endurance, speed, maneuverability, altitude, and range, were validated during the flight test.

=== Transportation & storage ===
The Abhyas drone has a dedicated box for its transportation and storage (2570 mm × 710 mm × 415 mm) made of Expanded Polyethylene (EPE) with Cross-linked polyethylene (XLPE) foam material inside. It is weather proof, drop and vibration proof and static load-tested.

== Usage ==
Abhyas's radar cross-section (RCS) as well as its visual and infrared signatures can be augmented to simulate a variety of aircraft for anti-aircraft warfare practices and testing of surface-to-air missile (SAM) systems. It can also function as a jammer platform and decoy. The HEAT system is utilized to do away with the post-launch recovery mode for Indian Navy, which is time-consuming and difficult in a scenario as the sea.

== Specifications ==
Data from
• Janes DRDO Abhyas
• DRDO tests Abhyas aerial target drone

General characteristics

- Crew: None
- Length: 2.385 m (7 ft 10 in)
- Diameter: 0.180 m (7 in)
- Gross weight: 75 kg (165 lb)
- Powerplant: 1 × Gas Turbine (19kg), with 25kg thrust

Performance

- Maximum speed: 648 km/h (403 mph, 350 kn)
- Range: 400 km (250 mi, 220 nmi)
- Ferry range: 500 km (310 mi, 270 nmi)
- Endurance: 30 to 45 minutes
- Service ceiling: 5,000 m (16,000 ft)
- g limits: +2 per turn

== See also ==
- DRDO Ulka
- DRDO Fluffy
- DRDO Lakshya

=== Comparable target drones ===
- Northrop BQM-74 Chukar
- Denel Dynamics Skua
- Meggitt Banshee
