= HAL Combat Air Teaming System =

Indian combat air teaming system

Combat Air Teaming System
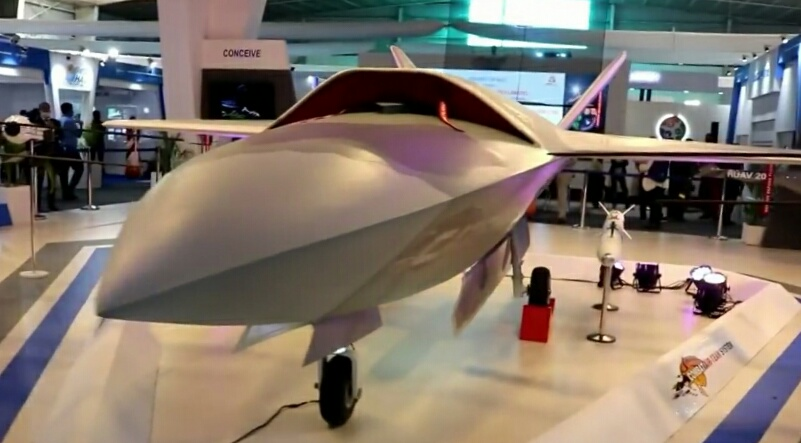

General information
- Type: Unmanned combat aerial vehicle
- National origin: India
- Manufacturer: Hindustan Aeronautics Limited
- Designer: Centre for Artificial Intelligence and Robotics; National Aerospace Laboratories; Newspace Research & Technologies
- Status: Under development
- Primary users: Indian Air Force (intended) Indian Navy (intended)

History
- Introduction date: 2027-28 (expected)

The HAL Combat Air Teaming System (CATS) is a planned Indian unmanned and manned combat aircraft air teaming system under development by Hindustan Aeronautics Limited (HAL). The system will consist of a manned fighter aircraft acting as "mothership" and a set of swarming UAVs and UCAVs governed by the mothership aircraft. A twin-seated HAL Tejas is likely to be the mothership aircraft. Various other sub components of the system are currently under development and will be jointly produced by HAL, National Aerospace Laboratories (NAL) and Newspace Research & Technologies.

The primary aim is to make multiple advanced aerial platforms that can act as atmospheric satellites for high altitude surveillance, perform autonomous deep penetration precision strikes from standoff distance with maximum firepower while reduce human error and the threat on life. HAL is planning to complete all the project related developmental work by 2024 or 2025.

== Design and development ==
HAL Combat Air Teaming is a composite amalgamation of a manned fighter aircraft acting as "mother ship" supported by number of swarming UAV and UCAVs. The objective is to make artificially intelligent (AI) high altitude surveillance drone, air launch platform and loitering munitions with full situational awareness to take out enemy targets from longer distance without human intervention. From 2017, the Indian Air Force (IAF), HAL and Newspace Research & Technologies quietly started working on CATS project beginning with the subsystems development. In the same year some initial testing were done at Pokhran Test Range.

The Ministry of Defence (MoD) in April, 2018 initiated a national level Innovations for Defence Excellence (iDEX) programme under the Defence Innovation Organisation. It is to encourage and help local startups develop advance technologies and products for future requirements of the Indian Armed Forces such as long range loitering munitions, stealth coating etc. Newspace Research & Technologies was one of the two Indian startups which were selected and funded through DRDO Technology Development Fund for the Combat Air Teaming System programme. Being one of the winner of iDEX, Newspace Research floated an idea for new generation autonomous aerial platforms that can achieve battlefield dominance and control inside enemy territory. In 2019, HAL presented the actual concept design and termed it Combat Air Teaming System (CATS). It included a family of AI based connected subsystems that will control and perform autonomous missions.

The Deputy Chief Test Pilot at HAL and in-charge of the CATS project Group Captain (Retd) Harsh Vardhan Thakur said, "CATS is an umbrella term for a combination of manned and unmanned stealth infused assets to increase dominance and decrease human casualties in a highly contested air space where it can perform air to air and air to ground operations". In future, CATS will also include an unmanned cargo transport and rotary unmanned aerial vehicle (RUAV) that can carry payload of 25–30 kg and drop it around 18,000 feet above sea level. HAL already started working on a 200 kg RUAV with a range of 100 km.

As of 2020, the technologies under development for mother-ship CATS MAX will be first tested on Jaguar MAX that will be equipped with DARIN III+ (Display Attack Ranging Inertial Navigation-III Plus) upgrade package before implementing of Tejas Mark 1A platform. HAL will also test an indigenous data link for faster data transfer on Hawk-i aircraft which is the locally upgraded version of BAE Hawk Mk.132 that may later on transferred to CATS MAX.

As per Director of HAL Engineering, Research & Development division Arup Chatterjee, each subsystem under CATS project will cost ₹40 crore while an initial investment of ₹400 crore is needed for CATS Warrior, CATS Air Launched Flexible Assets (ALFA) and CATS Hunter. The total expected cost as per HAL is ₹1,000 crore that will include technology development and prototyping. Till February 2021, HAL already invested resources on CATS programme from an allocated ₹400 crore internal budget with Indian Air Force planning to join at later stage of development cycle. The main component in CATS is the Tejas Mark 1A aircraft which could be modified with additional command & control interface for this purpose which will then act as Mothership for Air teaming eXploitation (MAX). This CATS MAX will be equipped or teamed up with other sub systems like CATS Warrior, CATS ALFA, CATS Hunter and CATS Infinity. To support the Manned and UnManned Teaming operations (MUM-T), an AI based combat algorithm is being developed under Air Combat Intelligence Development (ACID) project.

In 2021, all the systems are currently under various stages of design and development by HAL as the leading project agency in collaboration with National Aerospace Laboratories (NAL), Centre for Artificial Intelligence and Robotics (CAIR) of DRDO and Newspace Research & Technologies. CAIR is the main subcontractor to develop advance combat algorithm for artificially intelligent, autonomous target acquisition system under ACID project. As per HAL, it will take 15 months to convert Tejas Mark 1A into MAX platform. Under the work share agreement, HAL will develop CATS Hunter and CATS ALFA. At the same time Newspace Research will work on ALFS-S and CATS Infinity. While CATS Warrior will be a joint development effort.

All the components of the CATS project are expecting completion by 2024 or 2025. A modified twin seated HAL Tejas is expected to act as lead fighter aircraft.

The main combat drone HAL CATS Warrior, itself will be able to release a swarm of 24 Alpha-S drones. Similar systems are also being developed by agencies of China, Russia and the United States.

In January 2021, a swarm of 75 drones were flown to showcase the technological maturity of distributed coordinated control scheme based on heterogeneous roles at Army Command Headquarters (ACHQ) with the goal to gradually increase the numbers to 1,000. The control system under joint development with the Indian Army and NewSpace Research & Technologies will be used later on ALFA-S.

In 2025, it was reported that HAL is planning to modify the proposed HAL HLFT-42 to replace the Tejas and Jaguar as the mothership for the CATS.

== Components ==
=== CATS Warrior (UCAV) ===
CATS Warrior will be powered by an improved version of HAL PTAE-7 in a twin turbojet engine configuration which was previously used in DRDO Lakshya. Similar in operational role to the Australian Boeing MQ-28 Ghost Bat drone, it serves as an unmanned stealth platform which can be controlled by the Mothership CATS MAX in formation of 2-4 warrior drone from as far as 150 kilometer and is able to fly alongside it to accomplish tasks such as scouting, absorbing enemy fire or even attacking the targets if necessary with its internal weapons. With 700 km of maximum range for self-destruct suicide missions, CATS Warrior can also carry a payload of 24 ALFA-S up to 350 km for release and safely return to base. HAL is going to invest ₹390 Crore ($53.5 Million) for the development of CATS Warrior platform for which the company management already gave its approval as of February 2021. The integration with CATS MAX will take 1–2 years and first flights is scheduled for 2024–25.

=== CATS Hunter (ALCM) ===
With a KEPD 350 like appearance, the CATS Hunter will weigh 600 kg (1,300 lb) and will be powered by a single HAL PTAE-7 turbojet engine. It is designed as a low observable standoff air-launched cruise missile that can be integrated into CATS MAX, Mirage 2000, Jaguar or Su-30MKI and will consist of an interchangeable weapon carriage section based on mission profile that can carry 250 kg (550 lb) of unitary warhead or cluster munition with a striking range of 200–300 km (120–190 mi). Once the payload is dropped at the designated target, CATS Hunter will be able to return and can be recovered through a two tier parachute system. It will use multiple global navigation satellite system (GNSS) and terrain contour matching (TERCOM) with mid-flight updates for guidance and an imaging seeker that can help in automatic target acquisition during terminal phase.

=== CATS ALFA (Swarm carrier) ===
It is a carrier which will contain Air Launched Flexible Asset Swarm (ALFA-S) loitering munition. The carrier is capable of gliding and can cover around 100 km (62 mi) distance after being launched from the mothership. After reaching the desired distance, the ALFA-S can automatically separate from CATS ALFA and fly using its own propulsion thereby increasing the overall striking range. ALFA-S weight 25 kg (55 lb) has foldable wings of 1 to 2 meter long and can carry 5 to 8 kilogram of warhead with a speed of 100 kilometer per hour. ALFA-S is a networked swarm drone that can able to detect surface to air missile, radars and fighter jets stationed on ground. Using an artificially intelligent machine learning algorithm, the onboard mission computer and seeker on ALFA-S can perform autonomous target acquisition which then assign and self lock on target to perform suicidal attack using an individual or multiple drones. A Jaguar MAX will carry 24 ALFA-S in 4 CATS ALFA pods, while as per Group Captain Harsh Vardan Thakur from HAL Flight Operations Unit, Sukhoi Su-30MKI aircraft will be able to carry 30 to 40 ALFA-S during flight.

Under the India-US Defence Technology and Trade Initiative (DTTI), ALFA-S is the first joint project between Newspace Research & Technologies, HAL and the US Air Force Research Laboratory (AFRL). HAL will also help in the designing of CATS ALFA carrier platform that will air launch ALFA-S loitering munition. The first prototype of ALFA-S will be deployed on BAE Hawk 132 Advanced Jet Trainers.

=== CATS Infinity (HAPS) ===
CATS Infinity is a high altitude pseudo satellite (HAPS) being developed by NewSpace Research & Technologies. In 2017, Boeing helped in validating the UAV and was impressed by the design and technological advancement of Infinity in the field of aerospace engineering. The first flight of the system was planned from 2019. It is a solar powered high altitude drone with an endurance level as far as 3 months at a cruising altitude of 21 km (70,000 ft), weighing 500 kg (1,100 lb). Infinity is designed to be equipped with terrain mapping camera and will have the capability of producing airborne real time cueing hyperspectral enhanced reconnaissance for deep strike aerial missions inside enemy territory. With a wingspan of 50 m (160 ft), the drone uses multiple ultra-lightweight electric motors that generates a speed of 90–100 km/h (56–62 mph). New Space is working on high-density rechargeable Lithium-Sulphur batteries that will help constantly power the system for longer duration.

It is also intended as a platform for real time communication and control of unmanned ground vehicles like Mobile Autonomous Stabilisation System (MASS), Mobile Autonomous Robot System (MARS) and Muntra developed by DRDO as well as in drone warfare under the CATS program. The Infinity platform is built as an Indian alternative for civilian and military drones like Maraal UAVs, Facebook Aquila, Airbus Zephyr and AVIC Morning Star of China. As a civilian platform, it can also help in emergency management, internal security, providing communication for smart cities and traffic management.

The development of a "very high altitude, long-endurance" (VHALE) UAV by HAL was first reported of in December 2020. The drone was expected to have an altitude of 21 km (70,000 ft) and a loitering capability of several days. By then, multiple demonstrations had been given to the Air Force on such systems. The development and prototype cost is expected to be under ₹1,000 crore (equivalent to ₹12 billion or US$120 million in 2023). On 5 February 2021, the project was officially announced by Arup Chatterjee, Director (Engineering, Research & Development), HAL during the Aero India 2021 event and it was also revealed that the UAV would be developed jointly with a startup. The UAV would be a solar energised system allowing it to have an endurance of 2–3 months.

As of July 2021, HAL already started works on further improving the design of CATS Infinity with NewSpace Research & Technologies and is waiting for the approval from Ministry of Defence (MoD). As per HAL official, the development will take 3–4 years of time. The CATS Infinity will act as communication bridge between UAV and satellite, by providing live video feed and images of the battlefield.

As reported on 21 September 2021, HAL had sought approval for a funding of ₹700 crore (equivalent to ₹785 crore or US$82 million in 2023) from the Government of India for the self-financed project to develop a High Altitude Pseudo Satellite (HAPS). The approval was expected to be granted in October with the first prototype, a scaled-down version with a wingspan of 21 m (70 ft) and an expected cost of ₹50 crore (US$6.76 million), to be rolled out soon. The project development was expected to take at least 3–4 years. The final aircraft will have a weight of over 500 kg (1,100 lb) and a service ceiling of 21 km (70,000 ft). The project would be undertaken jointly by HAL, National Aerospace Laboratories (NAL) and a Bengaluru-based private firm. The project had already commenced as part of the unmanned drone warfare programme — Combat Air Teaming System (CATS). The plans for such a project had been revealed during the Aero India 2021 event. Such a UAV would serve both the purposes of telecommunications and remote sensing which are important fields in both military and civilian purposes.

On 13 July 2022, HAL sanctioned ₹42 crore (US$5.34 million) through internal funding to develop the first prototype. Further funding of the programme would be approved by HAL itself as required and would be independent of defence ministry funding. The prototype would be ready by third quarter of 2022. The MoD had already signed a contract with a Bengaluru-based firm for this project.

The sub-scale prototype completed its preliminary 5 minute-long test flight on 8 September 2022 without solar panels. A second test flight was also completed by the last week of September while a full-scale model was being developed for further testing. The full-scale model, with a wingspan of 24–25 m (79–82 ft), would have an endurance of 90 days. Meanwhile, the sub-scale prototype will have a wingspan of 8 m (26 ft). This was reported during the DefExpo 2022 exhibition held on 18–22 October. During the trials, the prototype was being launched from a speeding multi-utility vehicle on the runway at HAL's testing and factory airbase in Bangaluru. The unmanned aerial system (UAS) was initially being developed by NewSpace Research & Technologies (NRT) along with Hindustan Aeronautics Limited (HAL) as a prototype development partner.

The NewSpace Research & Technologies (NRT) has received a contract worth ₹1,000 crore (US$100 million) from the Ministry of Defence. The project is being undertaken by the Innovation of Defence Excellence (iDEX) initiative of the Defence Innovation Organisation (DIO), Department of Defence Production. NRT has been tasked to develop a proof-of-concept demonstrator HAPS to achieve an endurance of over 48 hours. This is a Make I project of the Indian Air Force, which implies that 70% of the project will be funded by the Government of India. The Indian Navy is also interested in the project. The HAPS has been envisioned as a solar-powered, stratospheric UAV equipped with solar regenerative powertrain. It would be capable of carrying a variety of payloads to support missions including for Intelligence, Surveillance and Reconnaissance (ISR), Airborne Data Relay (ADR) as well as maritime reconnaissance. The platform provides the endurance of a satellite with the mission aspects of an aircraft. The project is progressing parallel to a similar project of CSIR's National Aerospace Laboratories (NAL) — High-Altitude Platform (HAP).

On 22 December 2025, NRT conducted the first flight of its long-endurance HAPS drone achieving an endurance of 21 hours. This was a Winter Solstice trial which tests the capacity of a solar-powered drone on the shortest day of the year. The next trial will be during the Summer Solstice, when the Sub will be brightest.

During another flight test campaign on 14–15 May 2024, the scaled down prototype set a new national endurance record of 27 hours at an altitude of 7,900 m (26,000 ft). The flight test was conducted at Chitradurga Aeronautical Test Range. This was a part of an envelope expansion flight.

== See also ==
- Airbus Zephyr
- Boeing Airpower Teaming System
- Collaborative combat aircraft
- DRDO Ghatak
- Facebook Aquila
- History of unmanned combat aerial vehicles
- Kratos XQ-58 Valkyrie
