= HAL CATS Warrior =

Unmanned combat aerial vehicle

CATS Warrior
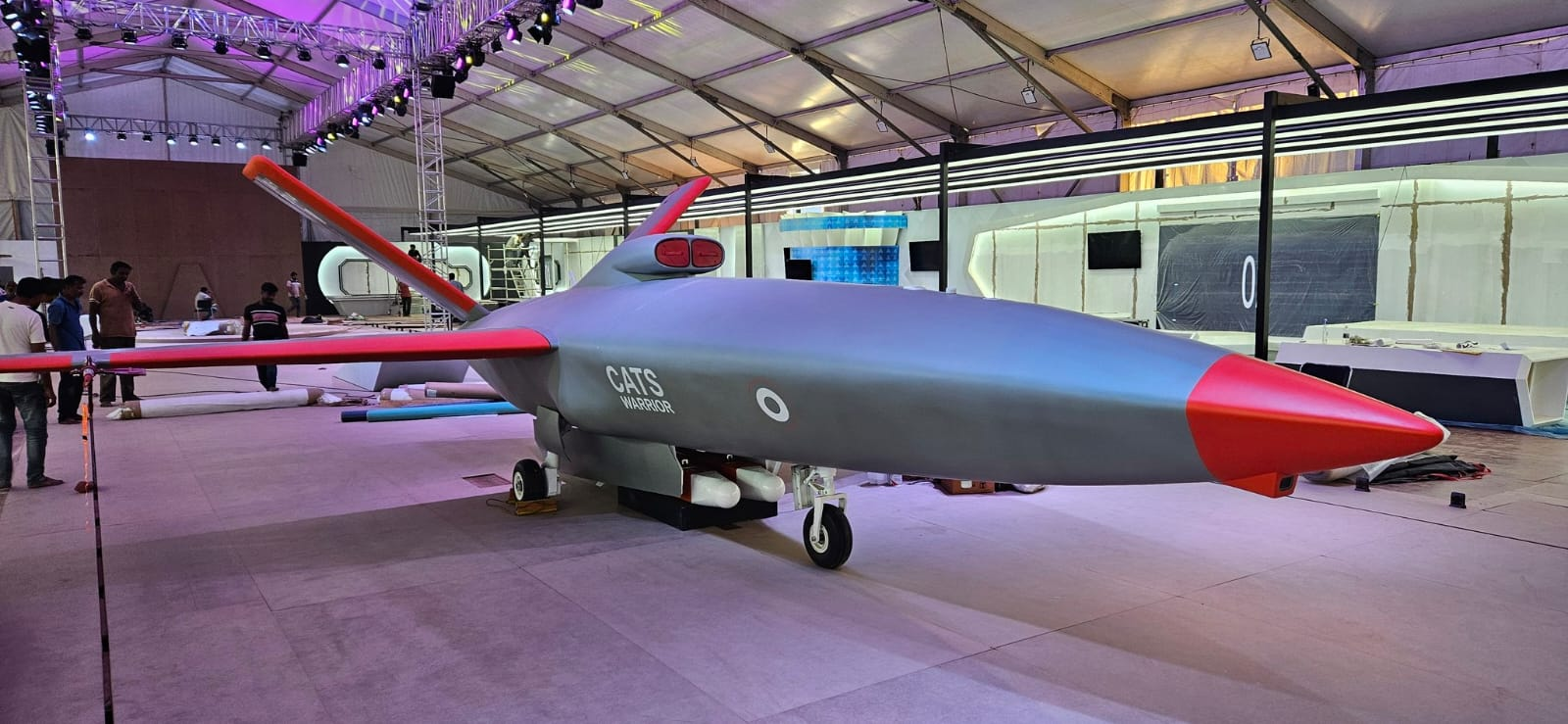
- HAL CATS Warrior prototype at Aero India 2025

General information
- Type: Loyal wingman drone
- National origin: India
- Designer: Hindustan Aeronautics Limited
- Status: Prototype testing
- Primary users: Indian Air Force (intended) Indian Navy (intended)

History
- First flight: 2025 (planned)

HAL CATS Warrior is a low observable loyal wingman drone developed by the Aircraft Research and Design Centre (ARDC) under the state-owned Hindustan Aeronautics Limited (HAL). The aircraft is a part of the Combat Air Teaming System (CATS) programme undertaken by a Public Private Partnership (PPP) between the HAL and NewSpace Research and Technologies (NRT), an Indian private startup. In Aero India 2021, a scaled-down mock-up was presented for the first time. In Aero India 2025, a CATS Warrior prototype was displayed by HAL.

== Development ==
CATS Warrior is being developed as an autonomous wingman drone also capable of taking off and landing on land and at sea from an aircraft carrier. It will team up with existing and future fighter aircraft of the Indian Air Force (IAF) including Tejas, AMCA, TEDBF, Su-30MKI and Jaguar which will act as its mothership. The CATS Warrior is primarily envisioned for the IAF's use and a similar, smaller version could be designed for the Indian Navy. It will be controlled by the mothership and accomplish tasks such as scouting, absorbing enemy fire, attacking the targets if necessary with its internal and external pylons weapons or sacrifice itself by crashing into the target.

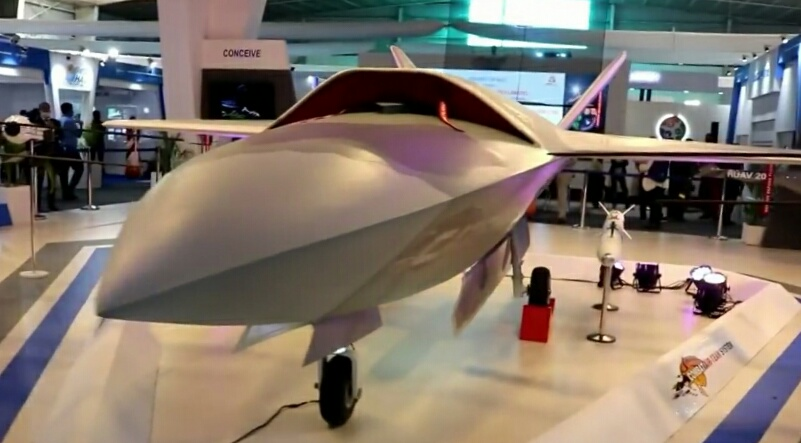
CATS Warrior model displayed in Aero India 2021

It will fly back for mission within the combat radius of 350 km and for long range mission with combat radius of 800 km it will sacrifice itself crashing into the target. As an unmanned asset, it can be directed towards a target and sacrificed in case it cannot be flown back to territory. "Warrior will serve as a 'sensor amplifier' for the LCA, flying out ahead of the manned aircraft and using its sensors to feed information back to LCA" HAL test pilot Group Captain H.V. Thakur (retd.).

The scale model of CATS Warrior was first unveiled at Aero India 2021. The Warrior scale model was accompanied by TEJAS-MAX cockpit which acted as a "mothership" for the CATS. HAL management approved an internal funding of ₹390 crore (equivalent to ₹478 crore or US$50 million in 2026) for the development as of February 2021. As per Arup Chatterjee, Director of HAL Engineering, Research & Development division the integration with CATS MAX mothership will take 1-2 years and first flights is scheduled for 2024-25.

On 11 January 2025, Hindustan Aeronautics Limited (HAL) successfully conducted the engine ground run of a full-scale technology demonstrator of the aircraft. CATS Warrior is one of the flagship programmes of HAL. Multiple design changes has been brought up in the demonstrator as compared with the scale model, most importantly the air intake. The new design shifted from angular surfaces which prioritised stealth. A report stated that, instead, "the aircraft uses RAM (Radar Absorbent Material) coatings and laminations with over 99% attenuation". These changes were made to enhance the performance while still being low observable. The changes could also increase payload and efficiency.

HAL displayed the prototype in Aero India 2025. The jet will undergo further ground testing, followed by taxi trials and first flight scheduled by the end of 2025.

As of March 2026, HAL was building a 3 tonne prototype which will be followed by 5 tonne and a 7 tonne prototype. Under the prototyping stage of the 3 tonne variant, the fuselage is being manufactured following the detailed design stage.

== Design ==
It has a composite structure with an internal weapons bay and hybrid design whose front section resembles MQ-28 Ghost Bat wingman and from its mid fuselage to tail similar to XQ-58 Valkyrie.

Avionics — It will be equipped with an electro-optic/infrared payload, Active electronically scanned array (AESA) radar, inertial navigational unit, and a jammer for intelligence, surveillance, and reconnaissance and combat operations. The prototype uses an indigenous Mission Computer from SLRDC.

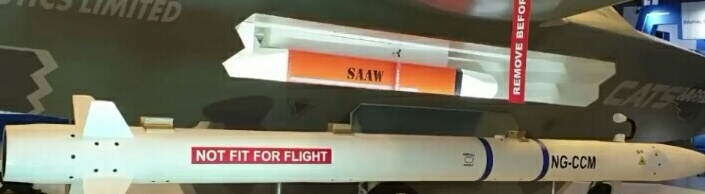
SAAW in warrior's internal bay & NG-CCM. (Note: The transparent place in the picture is not it's sideway weapon bay, its only a mean to see its internal weapon configuration in HAL warrior model at Aero India. The weapons will be stored internally in center of warrior's body not on its side.)

Armament — It can carry two new-generation short-range or beyond-visual-range air-to-air missiles externally, and two DRDO Smart Anti-Airfield Weapon (SAAW) internally in its internal weapon bay.

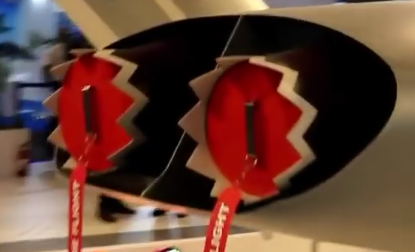
CATS Warrior wingman model with chevron exhaust at Aero India 2021

=== Propulsion ===
It has a single serpentine air intake on the top of its fuselage that leads to its two engines.

The CATS Warrior employs two HAL PTAE-W engines derived from the PTAE-7 engine developed by Aero Engine Research and Development Centre. The original variant of PTAE-7 is used on DRDO Lakshya target drone. The modified engine, designated PTAE-W, is a single-shaft, lightweight turbojet engine. The engine measures is 1.27 meters in length, 330 mm in diameter, and weighs 65 kg. The engine core includes a four-stage transonic axial compressor, single-stage turbine, annular flow combustion chamber, and 16 fuel flow burners. The engine variant also features a new FADEC system and an enhanced time between overhauls (TBO) of 1,000 hours with a thrust output of 380 kgf (3.7 kN) and a specific fuel consumption of 1.15 kg/kg.f/hr. Its exhaust will feature chevron nozzle design similar to the F-35 to reduce the Jet blast noises & radar emissions.

== Specifications ==
Data from The New Indian Express, Twitter

General characteristics

- Capacity: 650 kg weapon load
- Length: 9.1 m (29 ft 10 in)
- Wingspan: 7.6 m (24 ft 11 in)
- Height: 2.6 m (8 ft 6 in)
- Max takeoff weight: 2,100 kg (4,630 lb)
- Powerplant: 2 × HAL PTAE-W turbojet, 3.7 kN (830 lbf) thrust each

Performance

- Maximum speed: Mach 0.9
- Cruise speed: 790 km/h (490 mph, 430 kn) or Mach 0.7
- Range: 700 km (430 mi, 380 nmi)
- Combat range: 350 km (220 mi, 190 nmi)
- Service ceiling: 9,000 m (30,000 ft)

Armament

- Hardpoints: 4: 2 internal (155kg each) & 2 external (170kg each) with a capacity of 650kg, with provisions to carry combinations of:
  - Missiles:
    - 2 × ASRAAM air to air missile
    - 2 × NG-CCM
  - Bombs:
    - 2 × Smart Anti-Airfield Weapon
    - 24 × CATS ALFA-S

== See also ==
- DRDO Ghatak
- Boeing Airpower Teaming System
- List of unmanned aerial vehicles
- Kratos XQ-58 Valkyrie
