= HAL PTAE-7 =

Indian Small Turbofan engine

HAL PTAE 7
- Type: Turbojet
- National origin: India
- Manufacturer: HAL
- Major applications: DRDO Lakshya

The HAL PTAE-7 (Pilotless Target Aircraft Engine-7) is an Indian small turbojet engine developed by the Hindustan Aeronautics Limited (HAL)

The engine uses a four-stage, axial-flow compressor design with a single-stage turbine. The first stage is transonic. The engine is intended for target drones and other UAVs.

== History ==
In the late September 1980, the development project for indigenous development of PTA Engine (PTAE-7) was sanctioned at an estimated cost of ₹45 million (US$469,431.50) to HAL based on a feasibility study and project proposal submitted by HAL.It was intended to power the DRDO Lakshya Target drone. The engine was fully developed by HAL by September 1985, concurrently with the PTA. HAL announced the successful trial of the indigenously designed and developed remote-controlled PTAE-7 jet engine on 24 January 2001.

The HAL CATS Warrior employs two modified PTAE-7 engines that have been further developed by Aero Engine Research and Development Centre. The modified engine, designated PTAE-W, is a single-shaft, lightweight turbojet engine. The engine measures is 1.27 meters in length, 330 mm in diameter, and weighs 65 kg. The engine core includes a four-stage transonic axial compressor, single-stage turbine, annular flow combustion chamber, and 16 fuel flow burners. The engine variant also features a new FADEC system and an enhanced time between overhauls (TBO) of 1,000 hours with a thrust output of 380 kgf (3.7 kN) and a specific fuel consumption of 1.15 kg/kg.f/hr. The HAL CATS Hunter is also planned to use the PTAE-7 engine.

== Variants and Applications ==
- PTAE-7: Used on DRDO Lakshya Target Drone family
- PTAE-W: Upgraded PTAE-7 used on HAL CATS Warrior drone.
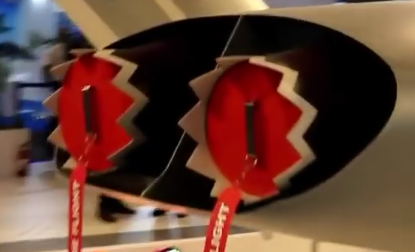
  PTAE-W on HAL CATS
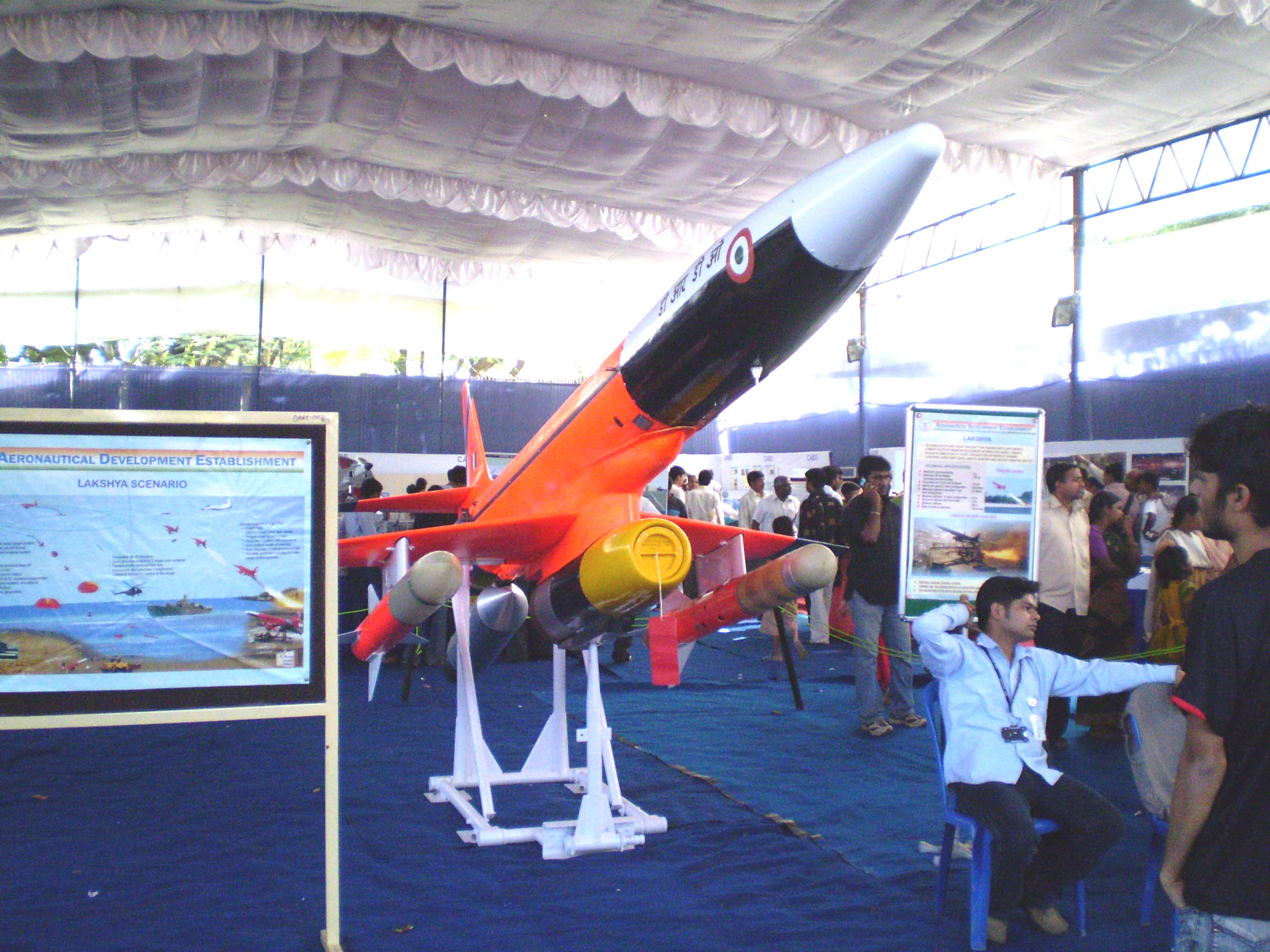
  Lakshya Target Drone with Podded engine (seen here in yellow)

== Operators ==
India

- Indian Air Force
- Indian Navy
- DRDO

== See also ==
- Williams J400
- GTRE GTX-35VS Kaveri
- GTRE Manik
- Microturbo TRI 60

== Sources ==
- Costa, Fabiola Paula; Lindquist, Luiz Henrique; Bringhenti, Cleverson; Tomita, Jesuíno Takachi; Cavalca, Diogo Ferraz (3 November 2019). An overview of small gas turbine engines. ISABE-2019.
