= Hindustan Aircraft G-1 =

Second World War Indian transport glider

G-1

General information
- Type: Transport glider
- National origin: India
- Manufacturer: Hindustan Aircraft Limited
- Number built: 1

History
- First flight: 1942

The Hindustan Aircraft G-1 was a Second World War Indian transport glider, the first design of Hindustan Aircraft Limited, only one glider was built.

== Design and development ==
The G-1 was designed in 1941 and 1942 and was a ten-seat semi-monocoque wooden glider. The fuselage was covered with 2-ply molded plywood with the rudder and elevators fabric covered. The single-spar cantilever wing had spoilers on the upper surface. The cockpit had dual controls for a pilot and co-pilot in tandem and the enclosure had framed transparent plastic panels for increased visibility, the cockpit enclosure could be removed to allow access and was jettisonable in an emergency. The rear fuselage had room for eight passengers with a large door on the right-hand side, the plastic windows in the fuselage had gun ports to allow the troops to fire rifles during the flight. One prototype was built with parts produced for a further ten gliders, only the prototype flew and the other ten were not assembled.

== Specifications ==
Data from Mrazek

General characteristics

- Crew: 2 (pilot, co-pilot)
- Capacity: 8 passengers or cargo
- Length: 30 ft 6 in (9.30 m)
- Wingspan: 56 ft 8.5 in (17.285 m)
- Height: 11 ft 1 in (3.38 m)
- Wing area: 300 sq ft (28 m^{2})
- Aspect ratio: 10
- Empty weight: 1,500 lb (680 kg)
- Gross weight: 8,818 lb (4,000 kg) with cargo

Performance

- Cruise speed: 160 mph (260 km/h, 140 kn) while being towed

== See also ==
- Military gliders
