= DRDO Ulka =

Indian UAV

Ulka (Sanskrit: meteor or firebrand) is an air-launched expendable target drone of India.

== Description ==
It has been developed by DRDO's laboratory Aeronautical Development Establishment (ADE). Ulka was earlier simply known as MT (Missile Target). It has been designed to be launched from subsonic or supersonic aircraft by means of an ejector release unit. It performed missions at altitude between 50 m and 13,000 m and speeds ranging from Mach 0.7 to Mach 1.4 with a rocket motor. It is able to simulate the speed and altitude characteristics of approaching, receding or crossing of a variety of aircraft using false radar signatures. It is used for defensive training of surface-to-air missile crews against anti-ship missiles and for development testing and evaluation of air defense systems. It can be air-launched by a variety of aircraft. It is the first Indian aerial vehicle to incorporate a canard configuration. It has been succeeded by Lakshya PTA.

== See also ==
- DRDO Lakshya
