= Hindustan Aeronautics Limited =

Indian aerospace manufacturing company pvt ltd

- Type: Public
- Traded as: NSE: HAL; BSE: 541154
- Industry: Aerospace; Defence
- Founded: 22 December 1940; 85 years ago (as Hindustan Aircraft); 1964; 62 years ago (Hindustan Aeronautics)
- Founder: Walchand Hirachand
- Headquarters: Bengaluru, Karnataka, India
- Key people: D. K. Sunil (Chairman & MD)
- Products: Transport aircraft; Fighter aircraft; Trainer aircraft; Helicopters
- Revenue: ▲₹33,542 crore (US$3.5 billion) (2025)
- Operating income: ▲₹10,820 crore (US$1.1 billion) (2025)
- Net income: ▲₹8,364 crore (US$870 million) (2025)
- Total assets: ▲₹106,266 crore (US$11 billion) (2025)
- Total equity: ▲₹34,985 crore (US$3.6 billion) (2025)
- Owner: Government of India (71%)
- Number of employees: 24,457 (March 2023)
- Website: hal-india.co.in
- Footnotes; Financials as of 31 March 2025.

Hindustan Aeronautics Limited (HAL) is an Indian public sector aerospace and defence company. Headquartered in Bengaluru, it is involved in the designing, manufacturing and overhaul of combat aircraft, helicopters, unmanned aerial vehicles, jet and turbine engines, avionics, and other hardware. HAL operates 11 dedicated research and development centres and 21 manufacturing divisions distributed across four production units. The company is majority-owned by the Indian government, and managed by a board of directors appointed by the Indian president through the Ministry of Defence.

Established on 23 December 1940 by Walchand Hirachand as Hindustan Aircraft Limited, the company is one of the oldest and largest aerospace and defence manufacturers in the world. The company began manufacturing aircraft in 1942 with licensed production of Harlow PC-5, Curtiss P-36 Hawk, and Vultee A-31 Vengeance for the Indian Air Force. The company started manufacturing jet engines in 1957 with the licensed production of Bristol Siddeley Orpheus engines. It was established as Hindustan Aeronautics Limited on 1 October 1964. The HF-24 Marut, a fighter-bomber manufactured by HAL in the late 1960s, was the first indigenous combat aircraft built in India.

Since the 1980s, HAL has been involved in the licensed production of various foreign aircraft, such as MiG-21, MiG-27, SEPECAT Jaguar, HS 748, Dornier 228, and Sukhoi Su-30MKI. The company is involved in the production of indigenous aircraft, including the HAL Tejas fighter, and HJT-16 Kiran trainer aircraft. It has developed various helicopters such as the Chetak, Cheetah, Dhruv, Rudra, Prachand, and Light Utility Helicopter. It has produced various jet and helicopter engines in coordination with Rolls Royce, GE Aviation, Klimov, NPO Saturn, Honeywell, and Turbomeca. HAL also manufactures spare parts for Airbus, Boeing, and GE Aviation.

HAL at 9th Bengaluru Space Expo 2026, BIEC

== History ==
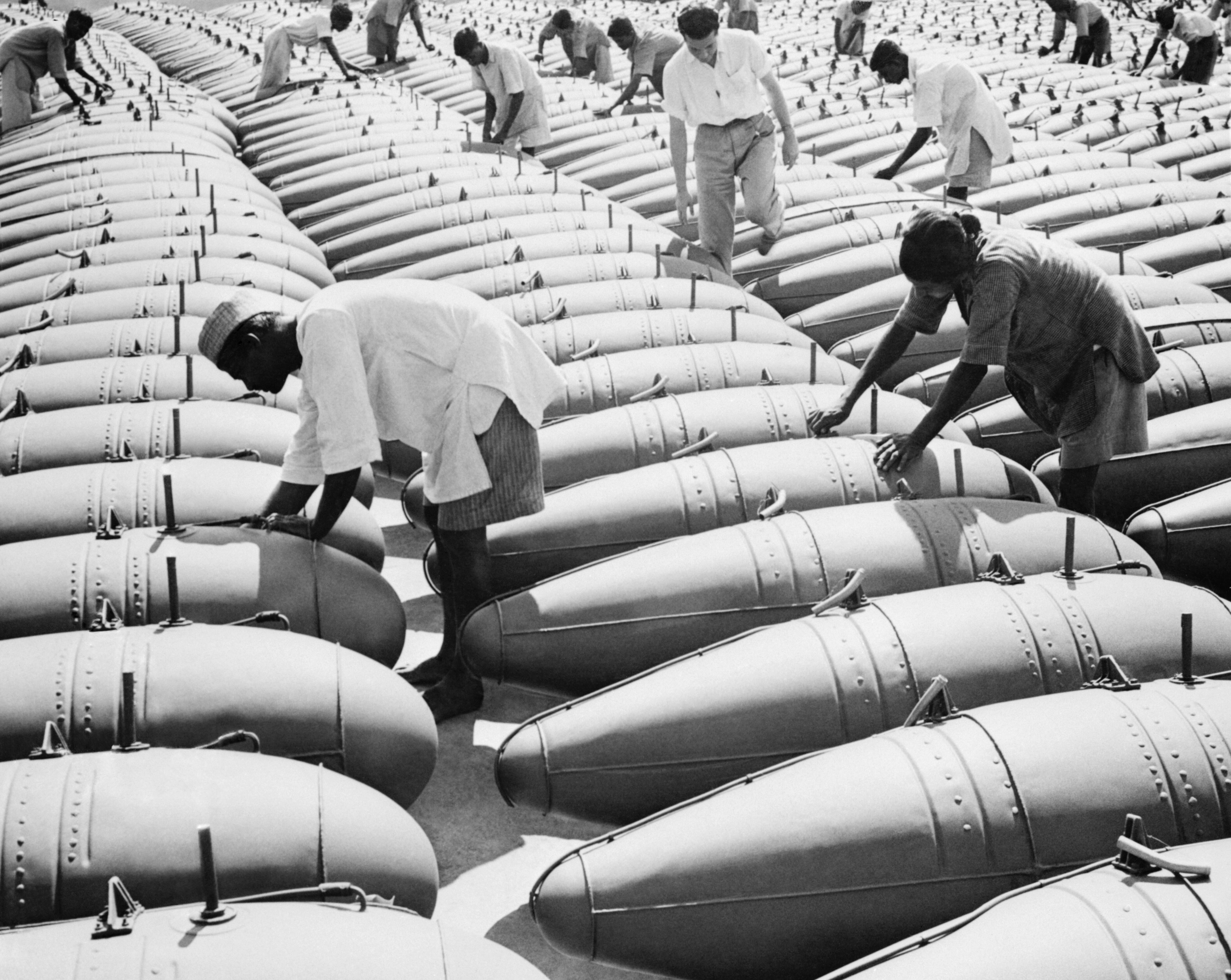
Workers check new fuel tanks at Hindustan Aircraft Factory in 1944

During World War II, Indian industrialist Walchand Hirachand sought to establish the first aircraft factory in India. He found a partner in American businessman William Pawley, and the two received authorisation from the British War Cabinet to set up a factory. Walchand approached different princely states for financial assistance, and the Mysore government agreed to help. A site was chosen in Bangalore east of the cantonment and close to several lakes. It would come to occupy 2,100 acres (850 ha), of which Mysore offered 700 acres (280 ha). Hindustan Aircraft Limited (HAL) was established on 23 December 1940 by Walchand, his colleagues, and the kingdom of Mysore. Construction of the aerodrome began the following day. Workers first had to clear the scrubland with its hundreds of termite nests and cobras. The cornerstone of the facility was laid in January 1941. The colonial government joined the venture in April, and the first aircraft made by HAL, a Harlow PC-5A trainer, took off three months later. The factory encountered difficulties such as the Axis powers targeting ships that were carrying parts from Europe.

After Japan joined the conflict, the government of India took over HAL in April 1942. That month Japan bombed Pawley's aircraft factory in Loiwing, China, on the Burmese border, prompting the relocation of its resources to Bangalore. The United States Army Tenth Air Force reached an agreement with the Indian government to use the factory, whose focus shifted from aircraft manufacture to the repair and overhaul of aircraft and engines. In September 1943, the Americans began running the facility. A wide range of planes passed through the factory, including C-47 Dakotas, B-25 Mitchells, and B-24 Liberators. The airfield had a taxiway between the runway and Bellandur Lake, where pilots carried out test flights of seaplanes such as the Catalina amphibian. The flags of the United Kingdom, United States, and kingdom of Mysore stood at the entrance to the factory during this period. After the war concluded, the Indian government reassumed control of the HAL factory in December 1945.

Hindustan Aeronautics Limited was formed on 1 October 1964 (the Registrar of Companies has a registration date of 16 August 1963) when Hindustan Aircraft Limited joined the consortium formed in June by the IAF Aircraft Manufacturing Depot, Kanpur (at the time manufacturing HS748 under licence) and the group recently set up to manufacture MiG-21 under licence, with its new factories planned in Koraput, Nasik and Hyderabad. The acronym HAL therefore remained. Though HAL was not used actively for developing newer models of fighter jets, except for the HF-24 Marut, the company has played a crucial role in modernisation of the Indian Air Force. In 1957, the company started manufacturing Bristol Siddeley Orpheus jet engines under licence at a new factory located in Bengaluru.

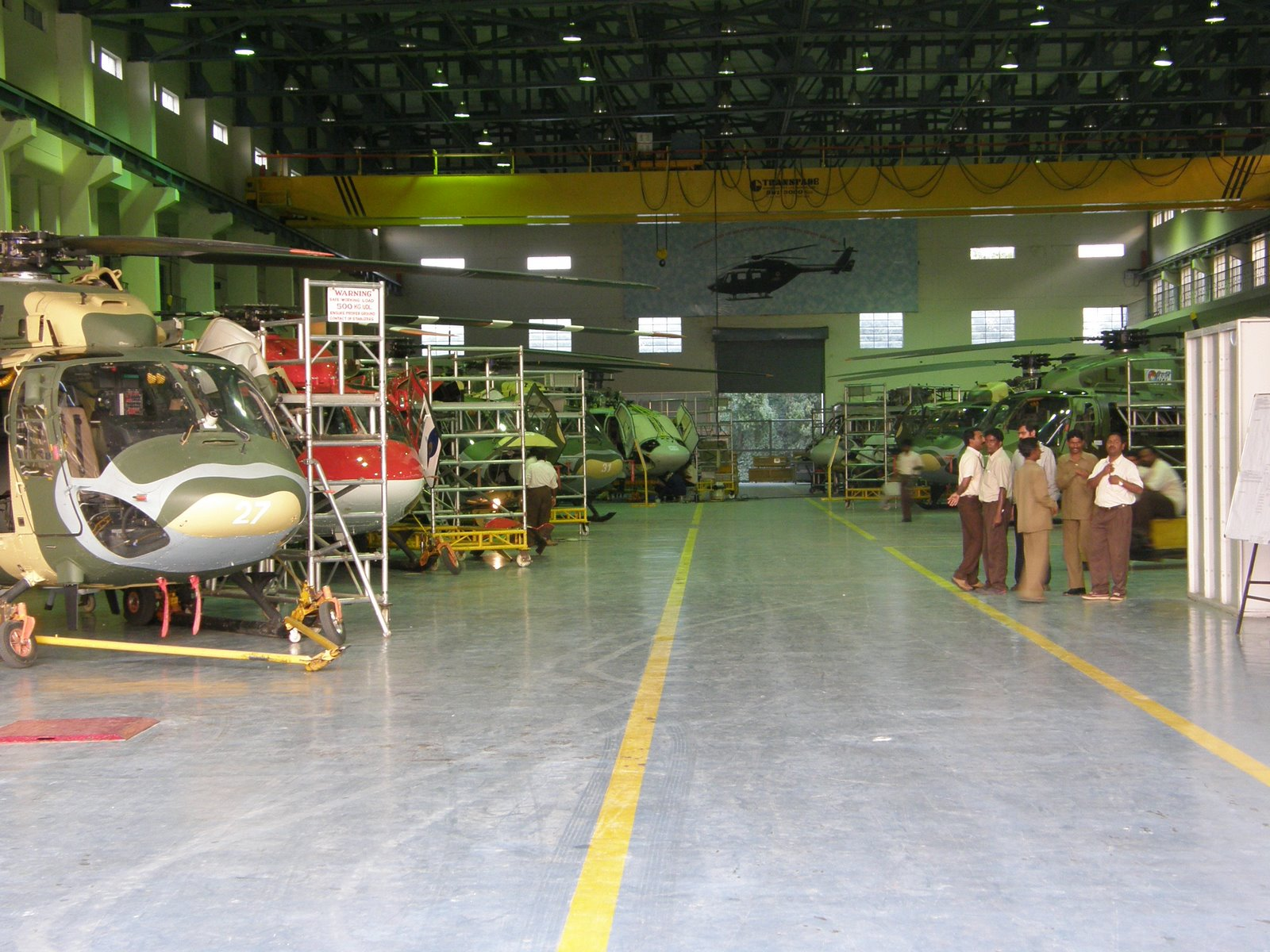
Production line of the HAL Dhruv at Bengaluru

During the 1980s, HAL's operations saw a rapid increase, which resulted in the development of new indigenous aircraft such as the HAL Tejas and HAL Dhruv. HAL also developed an advanced version of the Mikoyan-Gurevich MiG-21, known as MiG-21 Bison, which increased its life-span by more than 20 years. HAL has also obtained several multimillion-dollar contracts from leading international aerospace firms such as Airbus, Boeing, and Honeywell to manufacture aircraft spare parts and engines.

By 2012, HAL was reportedly bogged down in the details of production and has been slipping on its schedules. On 1 April 2015, HAL reconstituted its Board with TS Raju as CMD, S Subrahmanyan as Director (Operations), VM Chamola as Director (HR), CA Ramana Rao as Director (Finance), and D K Venkatesh as Director (Engineering & R&D). There are two government nominees on the board and six independent directors.

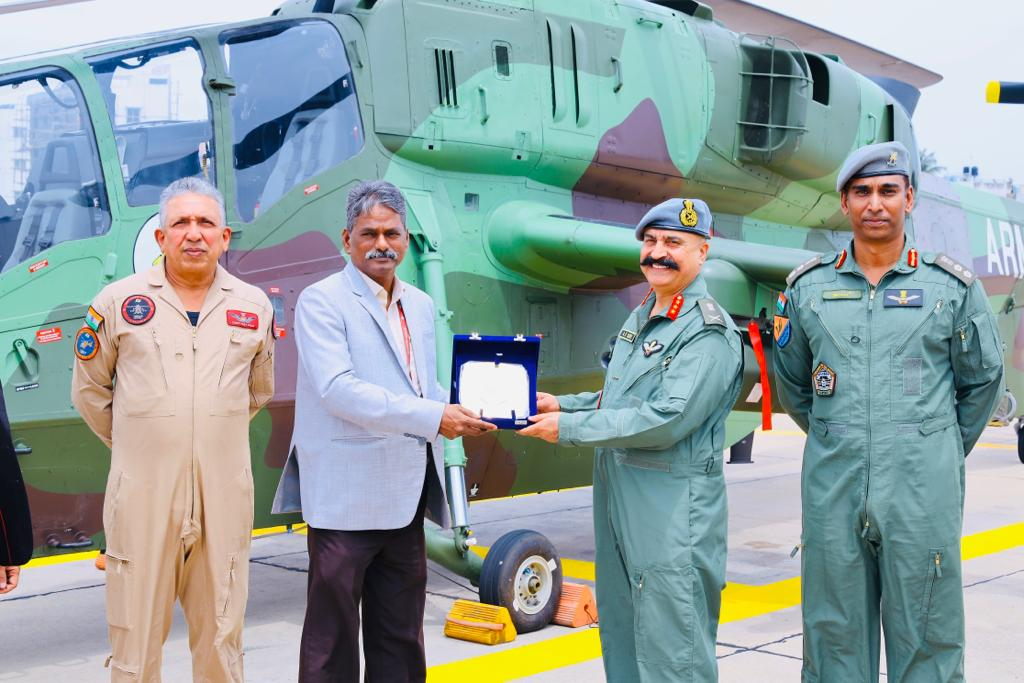
Light Combat Helicopter induction into the Indian Army

In March 2017, HAL's chairman and managing director, T Suvarna Raju, announced that the company had finalised plans for an indigenisation drive. The company plans to produce nearly 1,000 military helicopters, including Kamov 226, LCH (Light Combat Helicopter), ALH (Advanced Light Helicopter), and over 100 planes over the next 10 years. HAL will manufacture the Kamov 226T helicopter under a joint venture agreement with Russian defence manufacturers. The Kamov 226T will replace the country's fleet of Cheetah and Chetak helicopters. Over the next 5 years, HAL will carry out major upgrades of almost the entire fighter fleet of the Indian Air Force, including Su-30MKI, Jaguars, Mirage, and Hawk jets, to make them "more lethal". The company will also deliver 123 Tejas Light Combat Aircraft to the IAF from 2018 to 2019, at a rate of 16 jets per year. LCH production will now take place in a newly built Light Combat Helicopter Production Hangar at Helicopter Division in HAL Complex.

In view of the Make in India policy and to increase the share of defence exports to achieve the target of $5 billion by 2025, HAL is planning to set up logistic bases in Indonesia, Malaysia, Sri Lanka and Vietnam with priority target for Southeast Asia, West Asia and North African markets. It would not only help to promote HAL products but also act as a service centre for Soviet/Russian origin equipment.

In October 2024, HAL was given Maharatna status, which allows the company to have more operational and financial autonomy. In 2025, HAL invited private Indian companies to enter into a joint venture for the production of the Advanced Medium Combat Aircraft, in which HAL would hold a 50% stake and four private companies would each hold a 12.5% stake.

In June 2025, the Indian Space Research Organization (ISRO) transferred the technology of the Small Satellite Launch Vehicle to HAL, which was the first time ISRO transferred the entire technology of a rocket to a single company, for which HAL paid ₹511 crore (equivalent to ₹528 crore or US$55 million in 2026) to ISRO. Also in June 2025, HAL and Safran Aircraft Engines (SAE), a French aircraft engine manufacturing company, signed an agreement for HAL to manufacture rotating parts for SAE's LEAP engines.

=== Aero Engine Research and Development Centre ===
On 29 December 2023, Defence Secretary Giridhar Aramane opened a new design and testing facility at the HAL Aero Engine Research and Development Centre (AERDC) in Bengaluru. AERDC is involved in the development, testing and commercialisation of HAL's line of in-house aero-engines.

== Operations ==
One of the largest aerospace companies in Asia, HAL has an annual turnover of over US$3 billion. More than 40% of HAL's revenues come from international deals to manufacture aircraft engines, spare parts, and other aircraft materials. A partial list of major operations undertaken by HAL includes the following:

=== HAL Helicopter Factory, Tumakuru ===
On 3 January 2016, the Prime Minister of India, Narendra Modi, unveiled a plaque for the foundation stone for a helicopter manufacturing complex for HAL in the Tumakuru district. The 615 acres (2.49 km^{2}) factory, with an initial investment of ₹2,000 crore (US$297.64 million), would be the assembly line for the HAL Light Utility Helicopter (LUH) and would start functioning from 2018–19. The facility was expected to deliver 30 helicopters annually from 2019–20 onwards. The rate would be upgraded to 60 units per year in phase II within three to four years. Meanwhile, the per unit cost of LUH in 2016 was estimated at ₹40 crore (US$5.95 million). The limited series production (LSP), however, would be conducted at HAL's Bengaluru facility. On 22 February 2019, the CEO of the Helicopter Complex signed an MoU with the CPWD to execute stage 2 of the project which included infrastructure development works. During 2021, it was stated that the Tumakuru assembly line would become fully operational from March 2022.

On 6 February 2023, Modi inaugurated the Tumakuru greenfield manufacturing facility which is reportedly the largest in India. A phase III expansion to increase annual production rate to 90 units is also planned. The production portfolio of HAL Helicopter Factory will be further expanded to include the Light Combat Helicopter (LCH) and the Indian Multi Role Helicopter (IMRH). The facility will also handle the maintenance, repair and overhaul (MRO) of the Civil ALH, LCH, LUH as well as cater to potential export orders of the Civil LUH. The company plans to manufacture over 1,000 helicopters in the range of 3–15 tonne class over 20 years. Sub-facilities include a Heli-Runway, Flight Hangar, Final Assembly Hangar, Structure Assembly Hangar, Air Traffic Control and other support functions.

On 13 April 2026, Secretary (Defence Production), Sanjeev Kumar, inaugurated the LCH production line and an Automated Storage & Retrieval System (ASRS) at the factory. He also visited the LUH production facility and the LCH equipping hangar.

=== HAL Airport ===
HAL owns and operates HAL Airport (ICAO:VOBG) in Bengaluru. The airport served as Bengaluru's only airport until all operations shifted to the Kempegowda International Airport in 2008. With respect to defence activities, HAL and the Indian military perform test flights from the airfield.

The airport is still used for occasional non-scheduled civilian operations, including VIP aircraft movements, charter flights, and air ambulances. The airport offers a VIP lounge, air-freight warehouse, and maintenance hangar. The closed civil enclave possessed two terminals, one for domestic flights and the other for international services.

=== Nashik Airfield ===
HAL also manages AFS Ojhar and the Nashik Airport in Maharastra. The Airfield is located near to HAL's production lines and is used to primarily for development, testing and construction of aircraft for the Indian Armed Forces. It is home to a maintenance station of the Indian Air Force and also supports widebody commercial and cargo services.

=== Kanpur Airfield ===
HAL maintains an MRO base and Base Repair Depots for the Indian Armed forces at Kanpur Airport . The airport also headquarters the Transport Aircraft Division of HAL which previously produced HS 748 Avro and currently manufactures Dornier 228 for Indian Armed Forces as well as commercial market.

=== International agreements ===
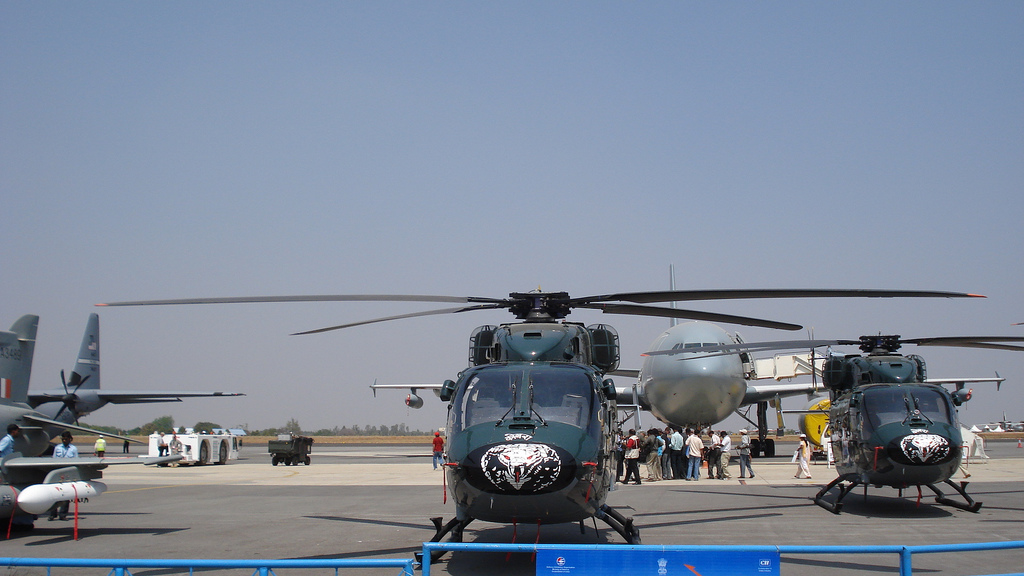
HAL Dhruv helicopters of the Ecuadorian Air Force in 2009 Aero India

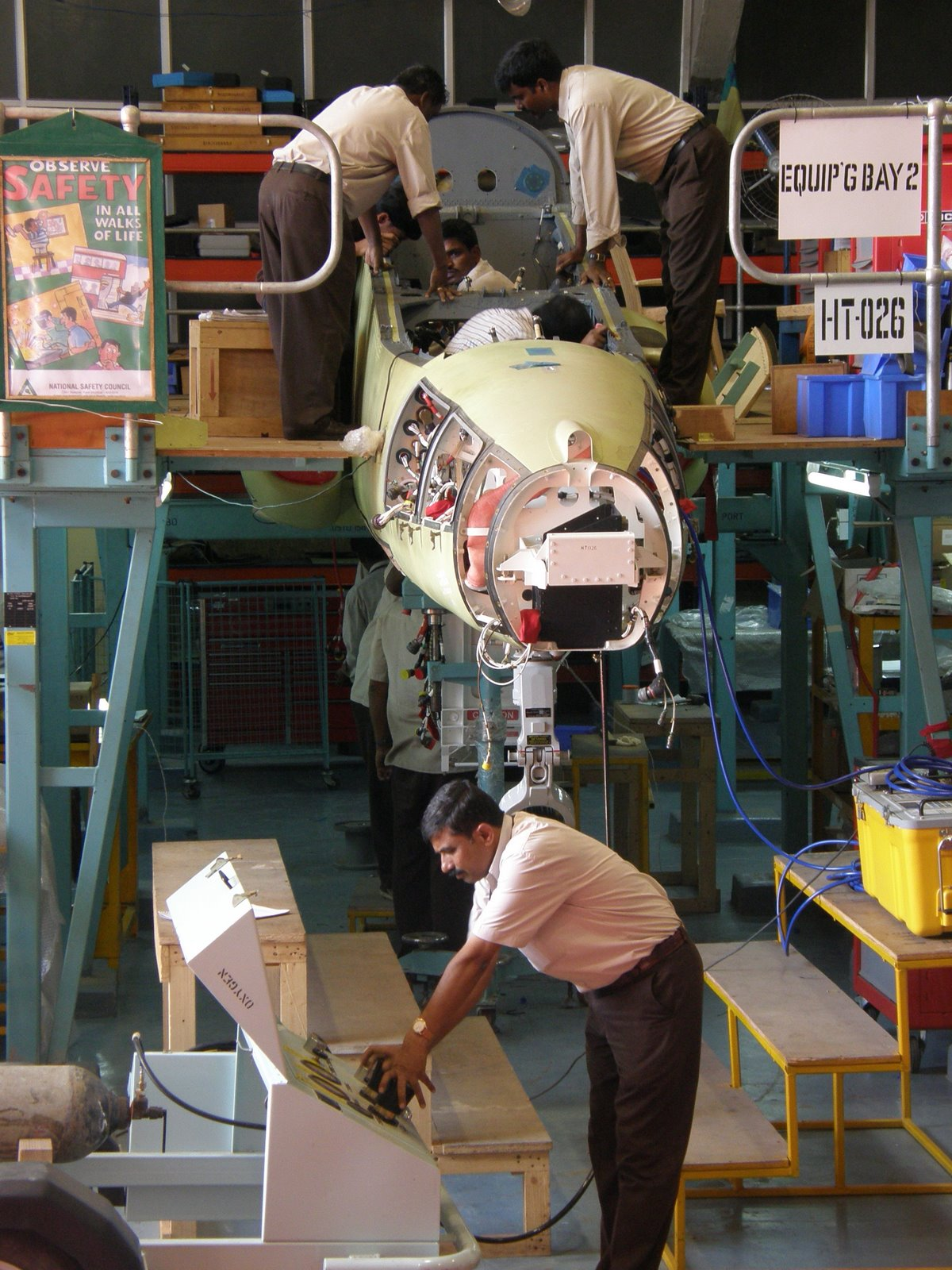
An IAF BAe Hawk being licence-produced at the HAL Hawk production facility in Bengaluru

- US$1 billion contract to manufacture aircraft parts for Boeing.
- 120 RD-33MK turbofan engines to be manufactured for MiG-29K by HAL for US$250 million.
- Contract to manufacture 1,000 Honeywell TPE331 aircraft engines for Honeywell worth US$200,000 each (estimates put total value of deal at US$200 million).
- US$120 million deal to manufacture Dornier 228 for RUAG of Switzerland.
- Manufacture of aircraft parts for Airbus SAS worth US$150 million.
- US$100 million contract to export composite materials to Israel Aerospace Industries.
- US$65 million joint-research facility with Honeywell and planned production of Honeywell TPE331 engines.
- US$50.7 million contract to supply Advanced Light Helicopter to Ecuadorian Air Force. HAL will also open a maintenance base in the country.
- US$30 million contract to supply avionics for Malaysian Su-30MKM.
- US$20 million contract to supply ambulance version of HAL Dhruv to Peru.
- Contract of 3 HAL Dhruv helicopters for Turkey worth US$20 million.
- US$10 million order from Namibia for HAL Chetak and Cheetah helicopters.
- Supply of HAL Dhruv helicopters to Mauritius' National Police in a deal worth US$7 million.
- Unmanned helicopter development project with Israel Aerospace Industries.
- US$15 million contract for supplying steel and nickel alloy forgings to GE Aviation for its global military and commercial engine programmes.

=== Domestic agreements ===
- 221 Sukhoi Su-30MKI being manufactured at HAL's facilities in Nasik, Koraput and Bengaluru. The total contract, which also involves Russia's Sukhoi Aerospace, is worth US$3.2 billion.
- 200 HAL Light Combat Helicopters for the Indian Air Force and 500 HAL Dhruv helicopters worth US$5.83 billion.
- US$900 million aerospace hub in Shamshabad, Telangana.
- US$57 million upgrade of SEPECAT Jaguar fleet of the Indian Air Force.
- US$55 million helicopter simulator training facility in Bengaluru in collaboration with Canada's CAE.
- 64 MiG-29s to be upgraded by HAL and Russia's MiG Corporation in a programme worth US$960 million.
- Licensed production of 82 BAE Hawk 132.

== Products ==
=== Indigenous products ===
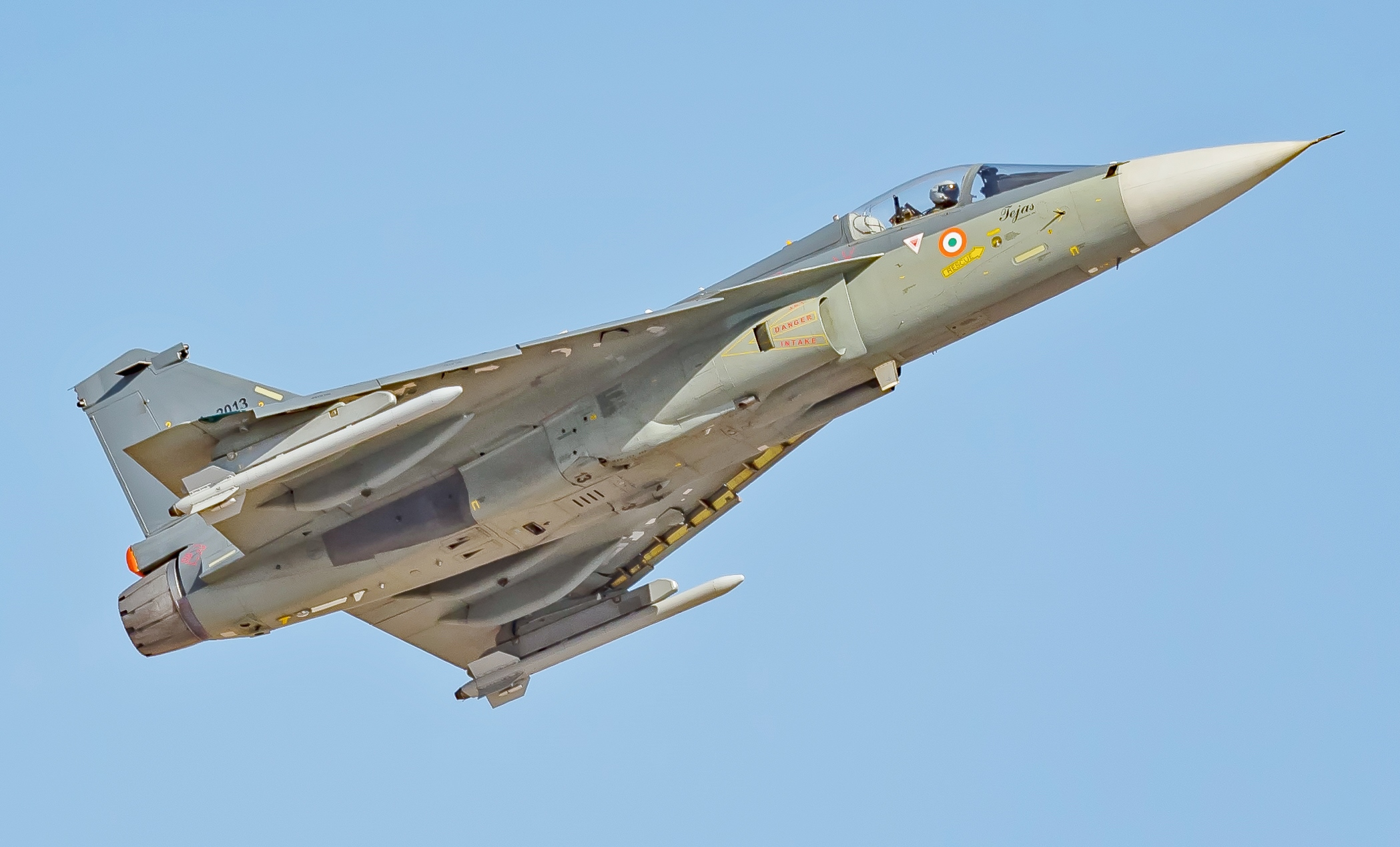
HAL Tejas

Over the years, HAL has designed and developed several platforms like the HF-24 Marut, the Dhruv, the LUH, and the LCH. HAL also manufactures indigenous products with technology transferred from the DRDO, in association with Bharat Electronics for its avionics and Indian Ordnance Factories for the on-board weapons systems and ammunition.

HAL supplies ISRO the integrated L-40 stages for GSLV Mk II, propellant tanks, feed lines of PSLV, GSLV MKII and GSLV MKIII launch vehicles and structures of various satellites.

==== Agricultural aircraft ====
- HA-31 Basant (1972–1980) (out of production)

==== Fighter aircraft ====
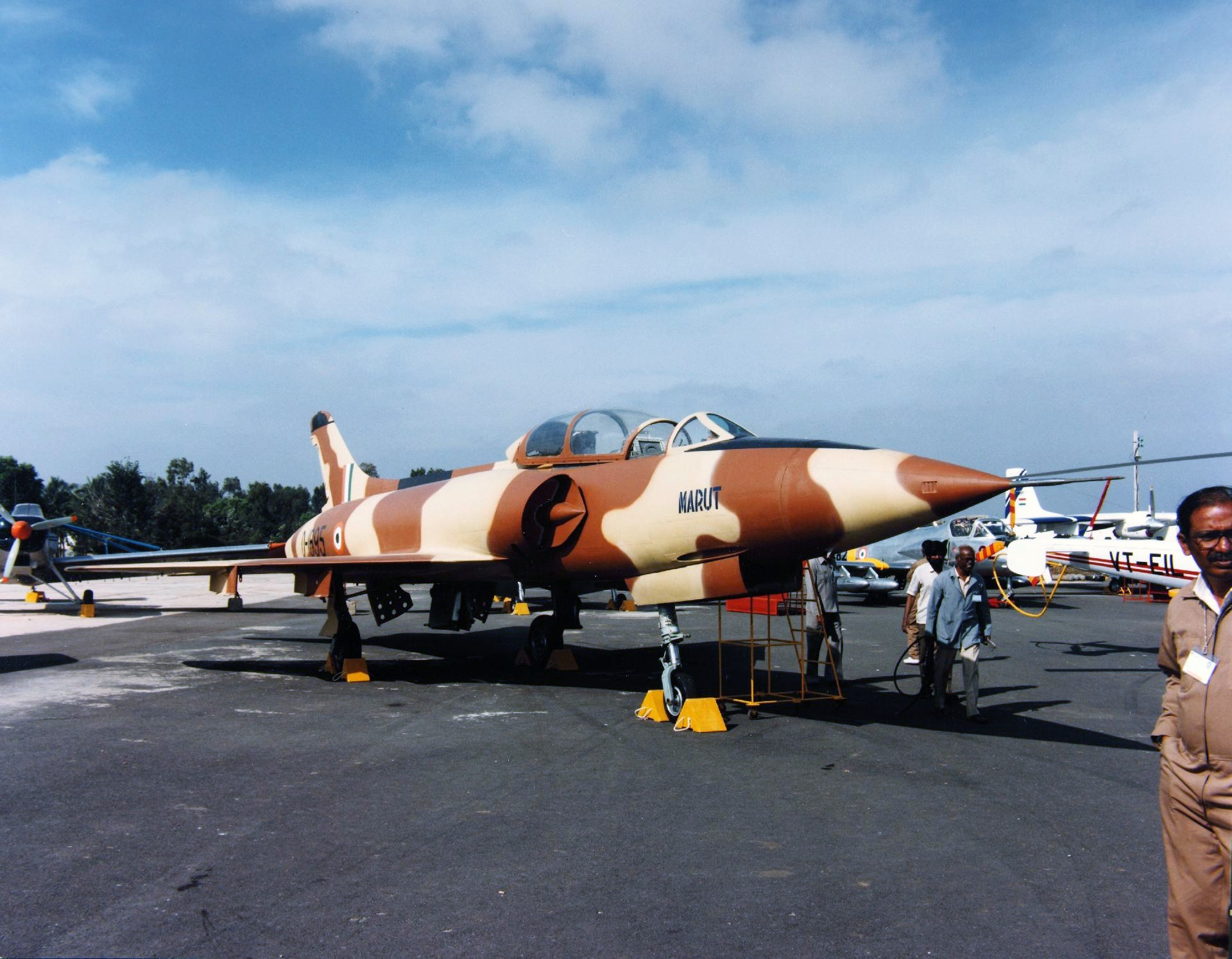
HF-24 Marut

- HAL HF-24 Marut — (retired) Mk.1 and Mk.1T (200+ built)
- MBB/HAL HF-73 — (cancelled)
- HAL Tejas — (in service) 4.5 generation light combat aircraft (LCA)
- HAL Tejas MK2 — 4.5+ generation Medium weight fighter (under development) 2027 first flight expected.
- HAL TEDBF — Twin Engine Deck Based Fighter is 4.5+ generation fighter for Indian Navy's aircraft carriers (under development). HAL ORCA version for IAF planned.
- Sukhoi/HAL FGFA — (cancelled) 5th generation fighter based on Sukhoi SU-57
- AMCA (consultancy only): 5th generation stealth fighter (under development)

==== Trainer aircraft ====
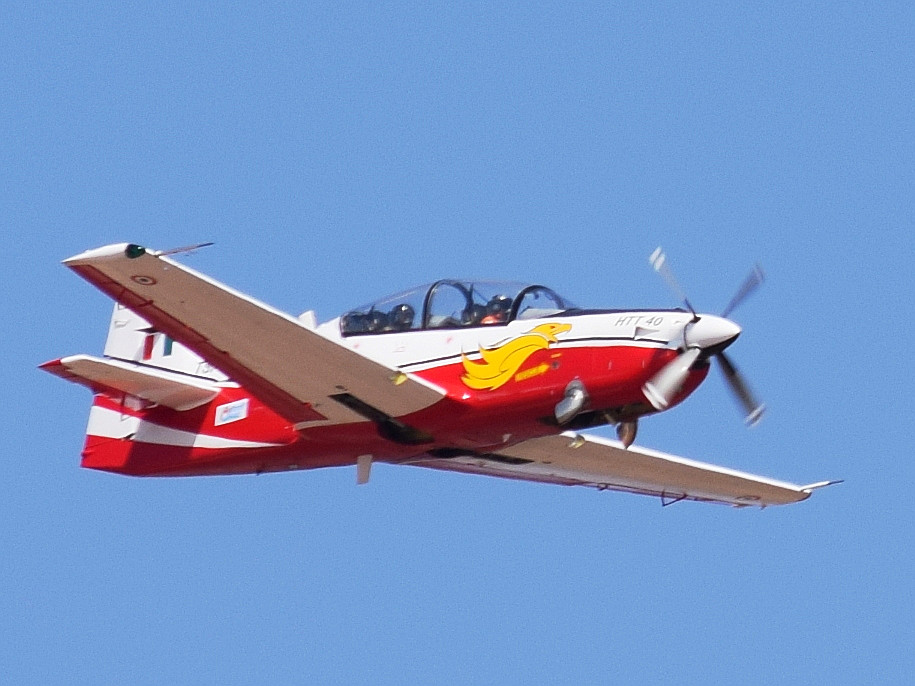
HAL HTT-40 Basic training aircraft

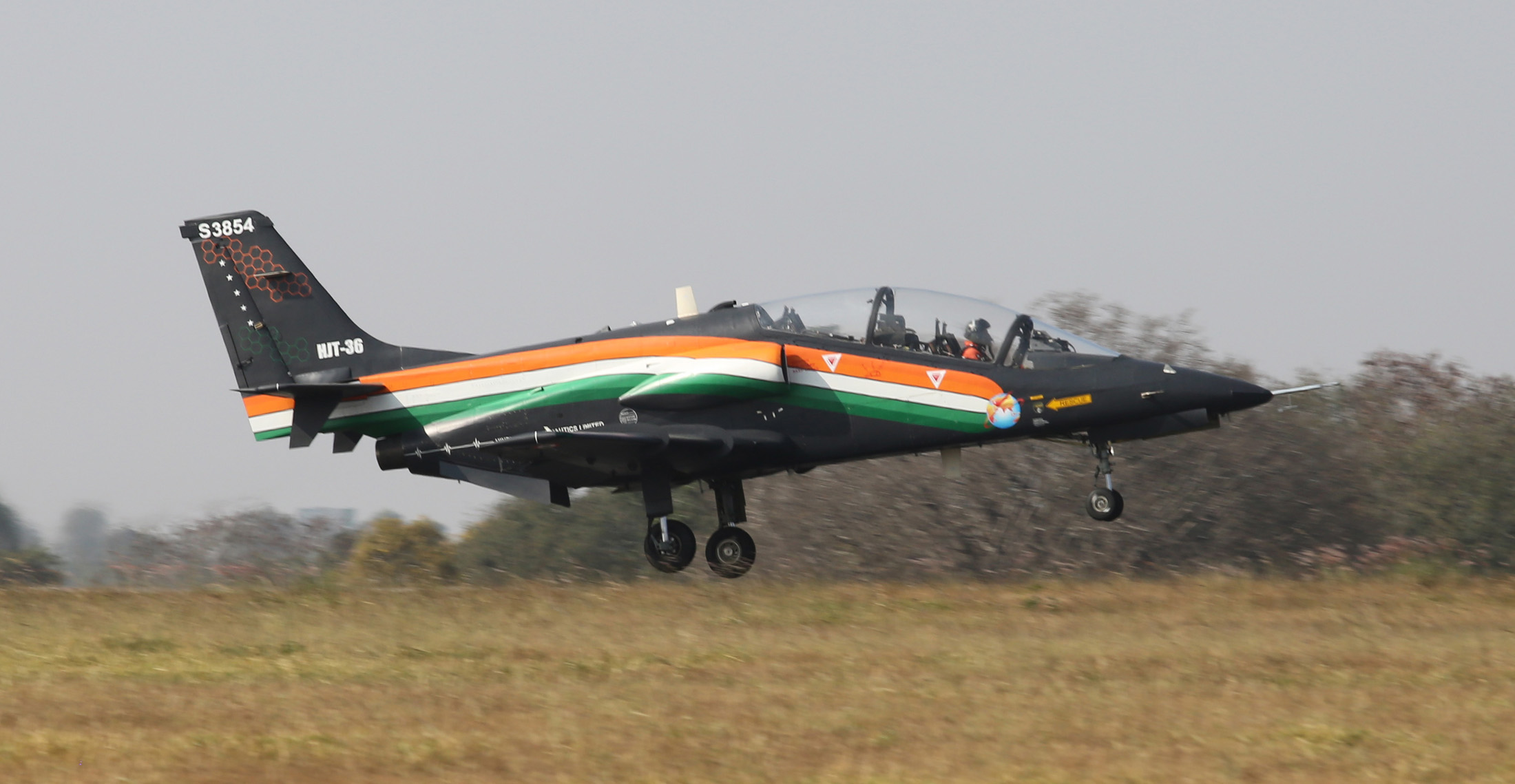
Hindustan HJT-36 Yashas Intermediate jet trainer

- HT-2 — (1951–1990) First company design to enter production. Exported to Ghana. (retired)
- HAL-26 Pushpak — (1958 to ~1960s) Basic trainer, based on Aeronca Chief. (out of production)
- HJT-16 Kiran — (1964–1989) (in service) Mk1, Mk1A and Mk2 - Turbojet trainers scheduled to be replaced with HJT-36 Yashas
- HPT-32 Deepak —(1984–2009) (retired) Basic trainer that was in service for more than three decades.
- HTT-34 — (retired) Turboprop version of HPT-32 Deepak
- HTT-35 (cancelled) — Proposed replacement for HPT-32 basic trainer in the early 1990s; not pursued
- HJT-36 Yashas — Intermediate jet trainer (under development)
- HJT 39 / CAT — Advanced jet trainer, developed into HLFT-42 (cancelled)
- HTT-40 — Basic trainer (in production) prototype flew its first flight on 31 May 2016.
- HLFT-42 — Proposed lead-in fighter trainer.

==== Passenger, transport, and utility aircraft ====
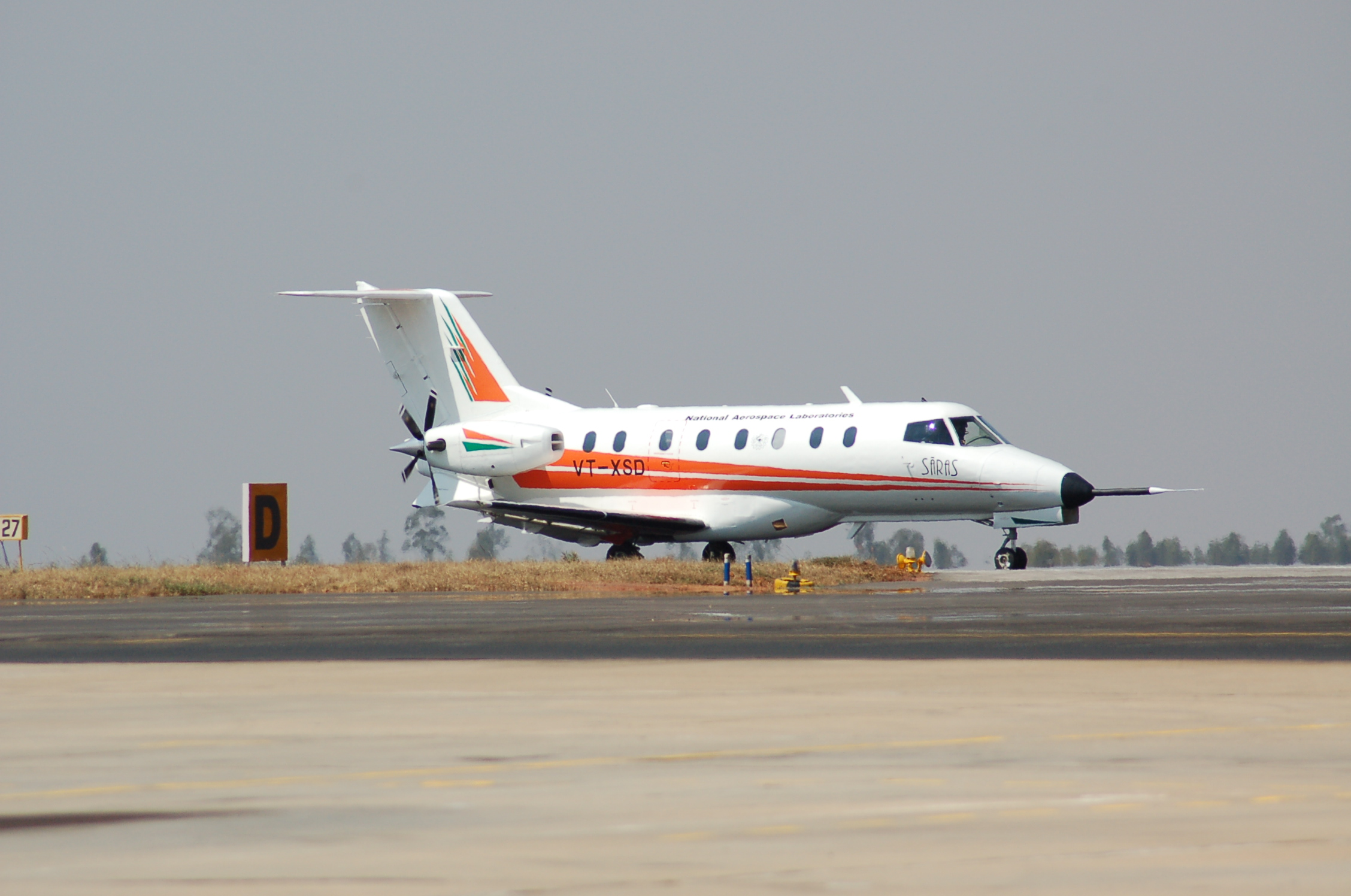
Saras, under joint development with National Aerospace Laboratories

- Saras — of 14-19 seater capacity multi-purpose civilian light transport aircraft jointly developed with NAL.
- Indian Regional Jet (IRJ) — (under development) of 70–100-seater capacity regional airliner to be jointly developed with NAL.

==== Helicopters ====
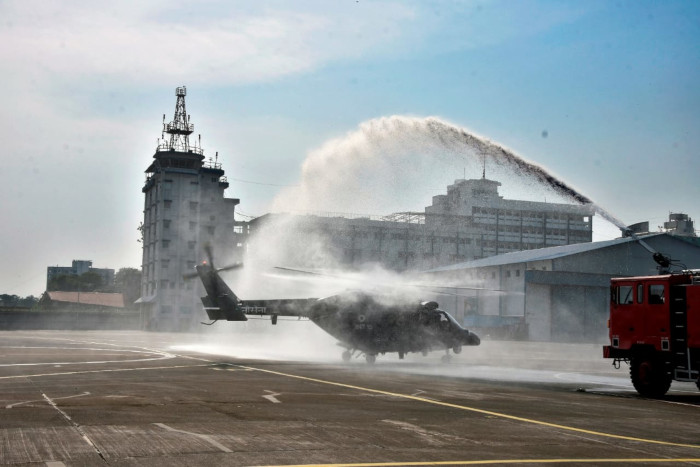
HAL Dhruv of Indian Navy

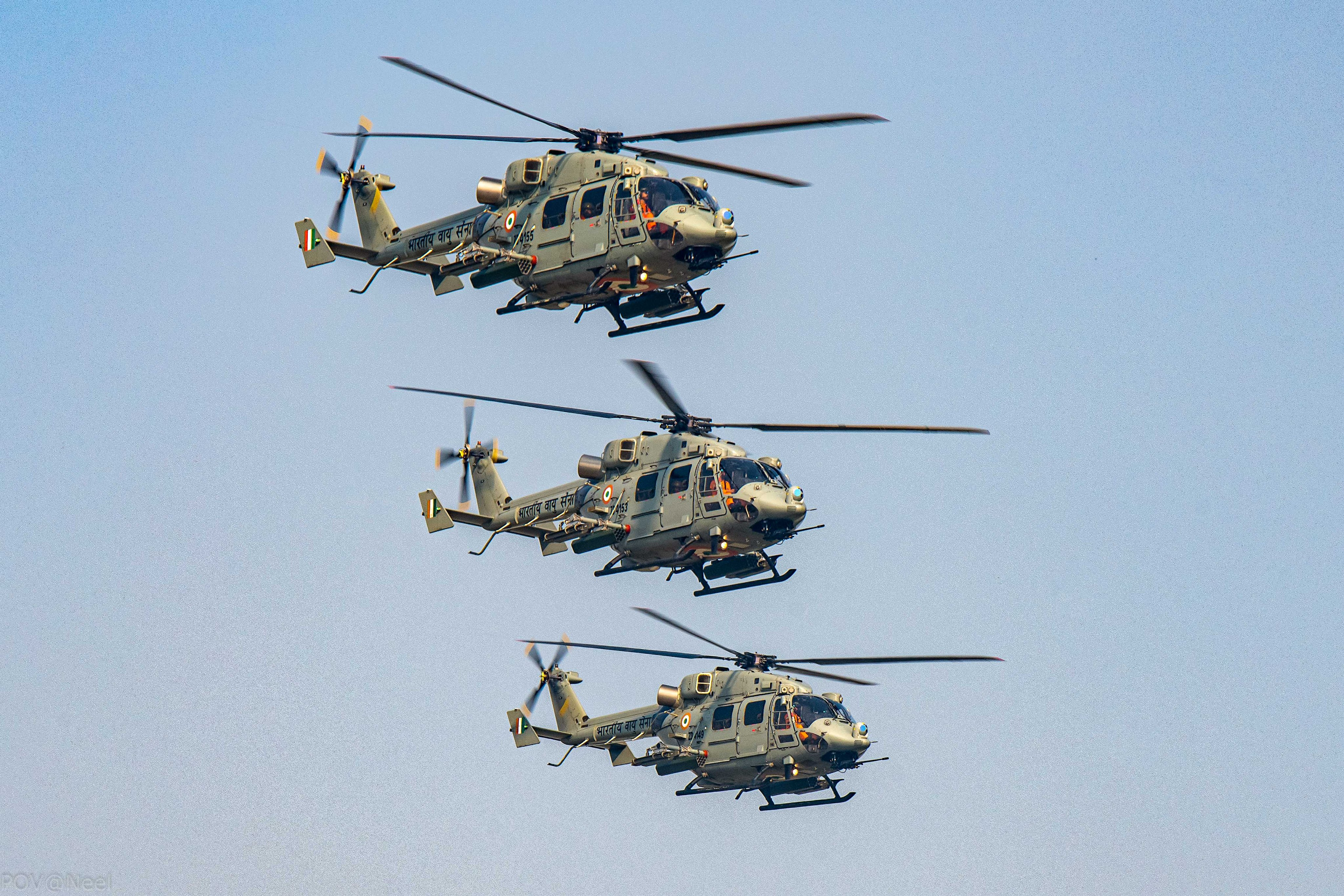
Formation flight of three HAL Rudras of Indian Air Force

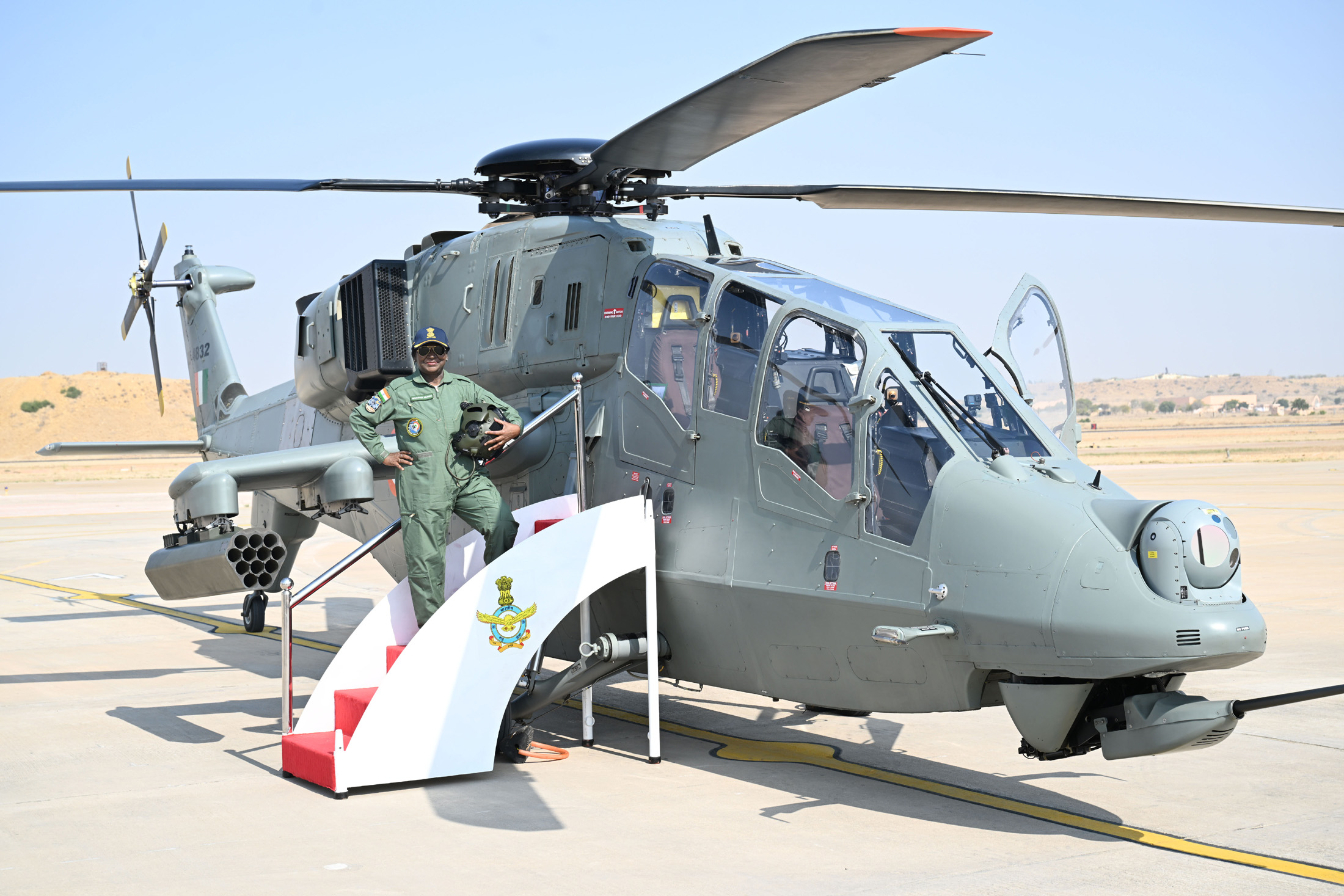
President Droupadi Murmu took a flight in HAL Prachand of the IAF.

- Dhruv — (in production) Advanced light helicopter
- Rudra — (in production) Armed and reconnaissance version of Dhruv
- Prachand — (in production) Light attack helicopter
- Light Utility Helicopter — (in limited series production) Light utility helicopter
- Indian Multi Role Helicopter — (under development) medium multi-role helicopter. Includes naval version.

==== Observation and reconnaissance aircraft ====
- HAOP-27 Krishak (1959 to ~1975) (retired)— Based on HAL-26 Pushpak

==== Unmanned Aerial Vehicles ====
- PTA Lakshya — (Target drone)
- PTA Lakshya 2 — (Target drone)
- Rustom — UAV family
  - Rustom-1 — Short Range UAV TD
  - Archer — Short Range UAV
  - SRUAV-W — Short Range UCAV
  - Archer-NG
  - Rustom-H — MALE UAV TD
  - TAPAS-BH-201 — MALE UAV
- Nishant — Reconnaissance UAV
- NRUAV — Unmanned rotorcraft
- HAL Combat Air Teaming System (CATS)
  - CATS Mothership for Air teaming Exploitation (MAX) — based on Tejas Mark 1A or SEPECAT Jaguar
  - CATS Warrior
  - CATS Air Launched Flexible Assets (ALFA) — Unmanned carrier and launcher of weaponized swarm drone ALPHA-S.
  - CATS Hunter — Modular multi-purpose weapon carrying system
  - CATS Infinity — High altitude solar powered atmospheric satellite

==== Gliders ====
- G-1 — HAL's first original design, dating from 1941. Only one was built.
- RG-1 Rohini
- Ardhra — training glider

==== Engines ====
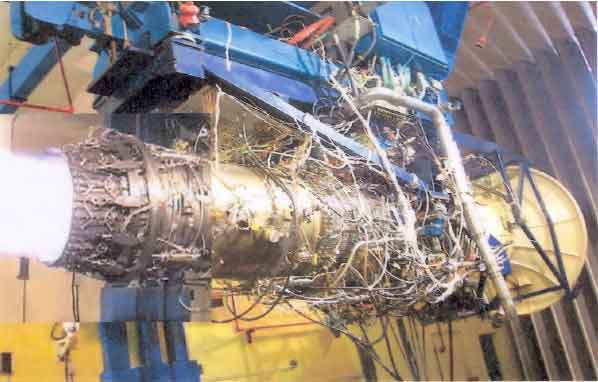
GTX-35VS Kaveri prototype testing

===== Cryogenic Rocket Engine =====
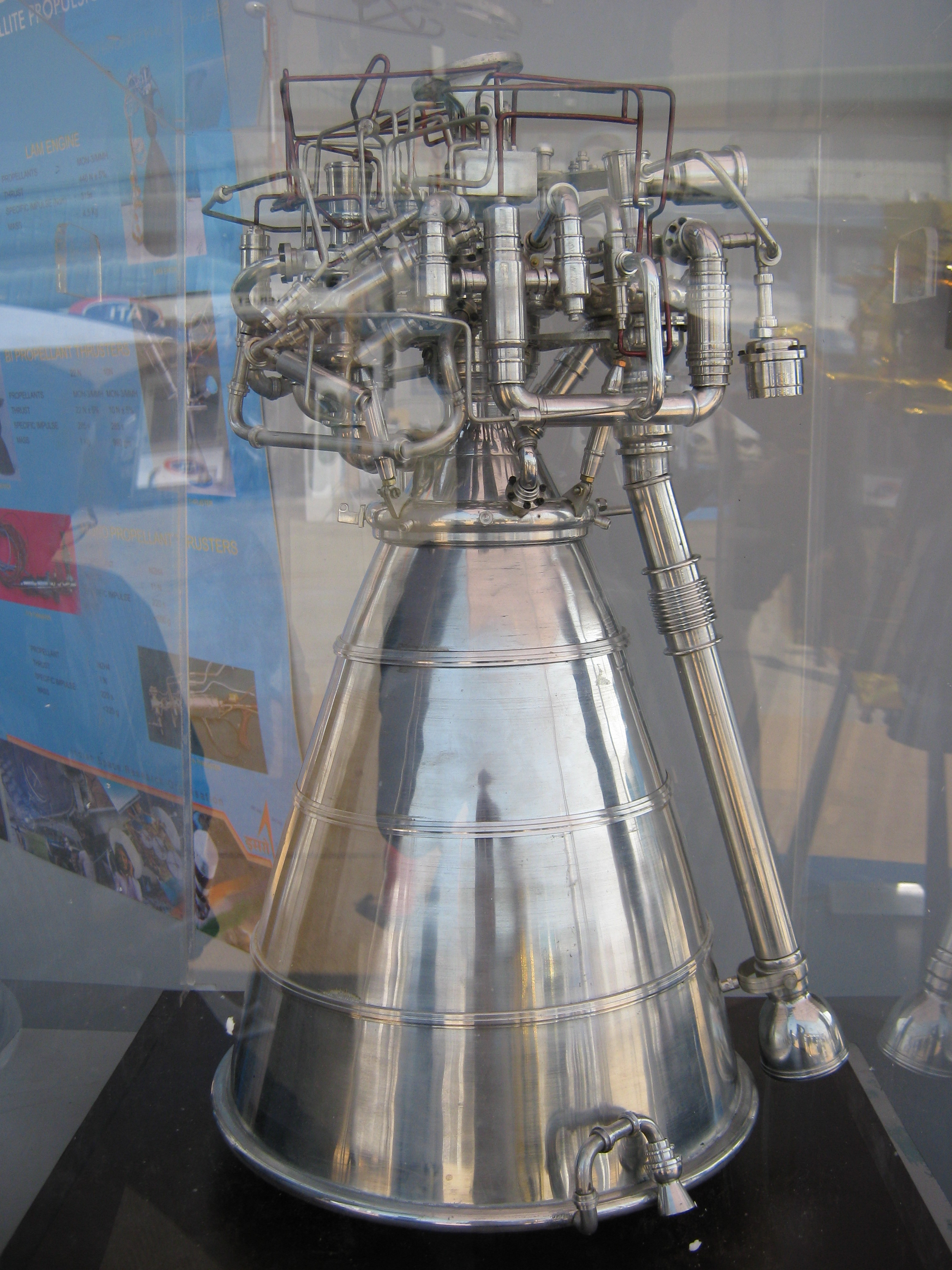
CE-20 cryogenic rocket engine. It is the most powerful upper-stage Cryogenic engine operational today.

- CE-7.5 — cryogenic rocket engine (in production, used on GSLV Mk.II Cryogenic upper stage CUS15)
- CE-20 — cryogenic rocket engine (in production, used on C25 upperstage of LVM-3)

===== Turboshaft Engine =====
- Shakti — a turboshaft engine for HAL Dhruv Helicopter, co-developed with Safran Helicopter Engines based on Safran Ardiden 1 ( in production and used on LUH, Dhruv, Rudra, Prachand )
- Aravalli—a turboshaft engine for the HAL IMRH and HAL DBMRH. Co-produced with SAFHAL, a joint venture with Safran Helicopter Engines. (under development)
- HTSE-1200 — a turboshaft engine can be used as engine alternatives for the HAL-developed LUH, Dhruv, Rudra and Prachand helicopters (under development)

===== Turbojet Engine =====
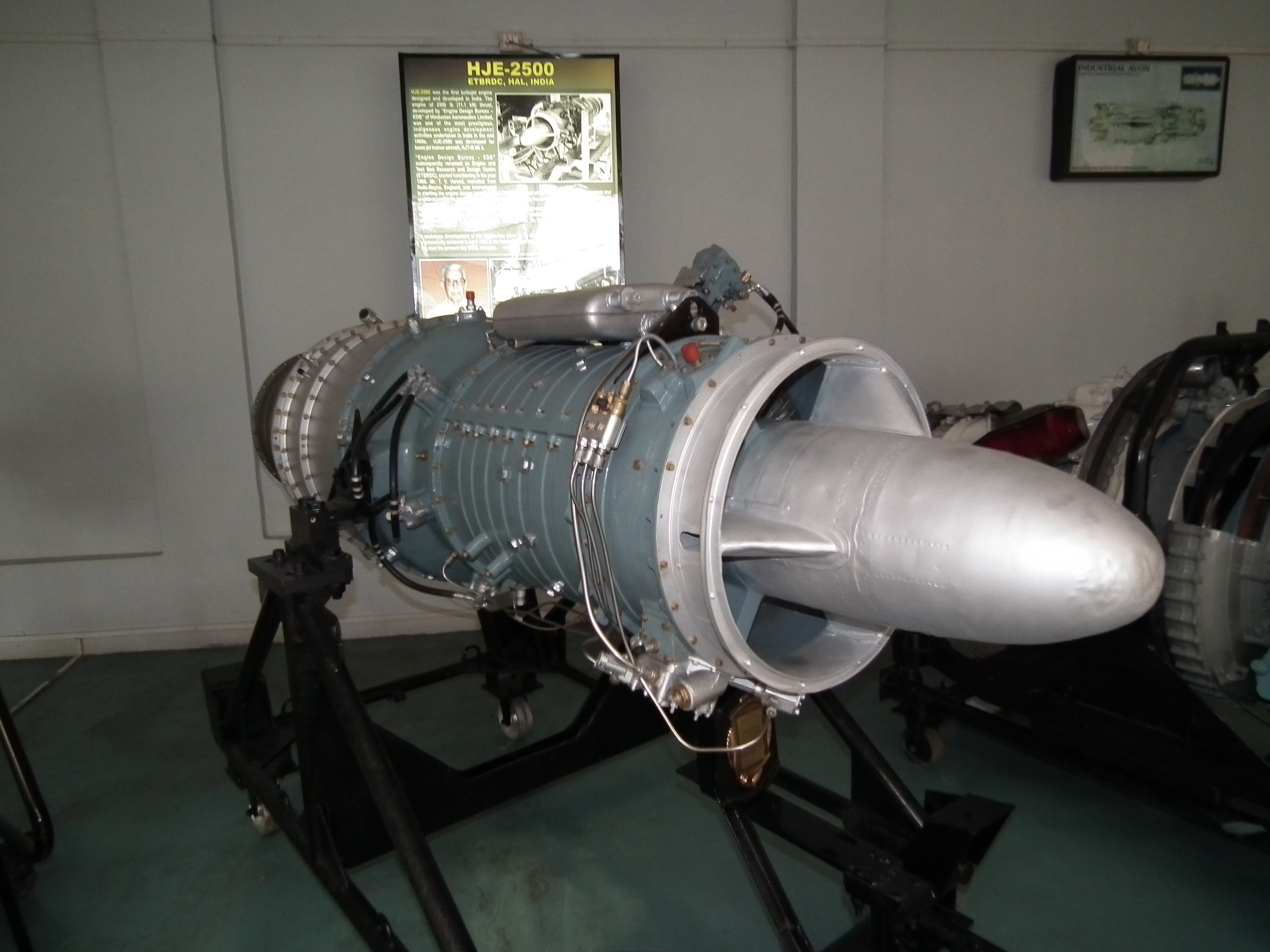
HAL HJE-2500 Engine at HAL Museum. Built in 1965, it was the first turbojet engine built by HAL

- Hindustan Jet Engine (HJE-2500) (retired)
- PTAE-7 — (in service) For indigenously designed Lakshya PTA

===== Turbofan Engine =====
- GTX-35VS Kaveri — a turbofan engine can be used in HAL-developed Tejas and AMCA, co-developed with GTRE of (DRDO) and Safran Aircraft Engines (under development)
- HTFE-25 — a turbofan engine can be used in single engine trainer jets, business jets and UAVs weighing up to 5 tonnes and in twin engine configuration for same weighing up to 9 tonnes (under development)

==== Rockets ====
- SSLV (Active): Technology Transfer from ISRO. To be built in partnership with L&T.

=== Licensed production ===
==== Fighter aircraft ====
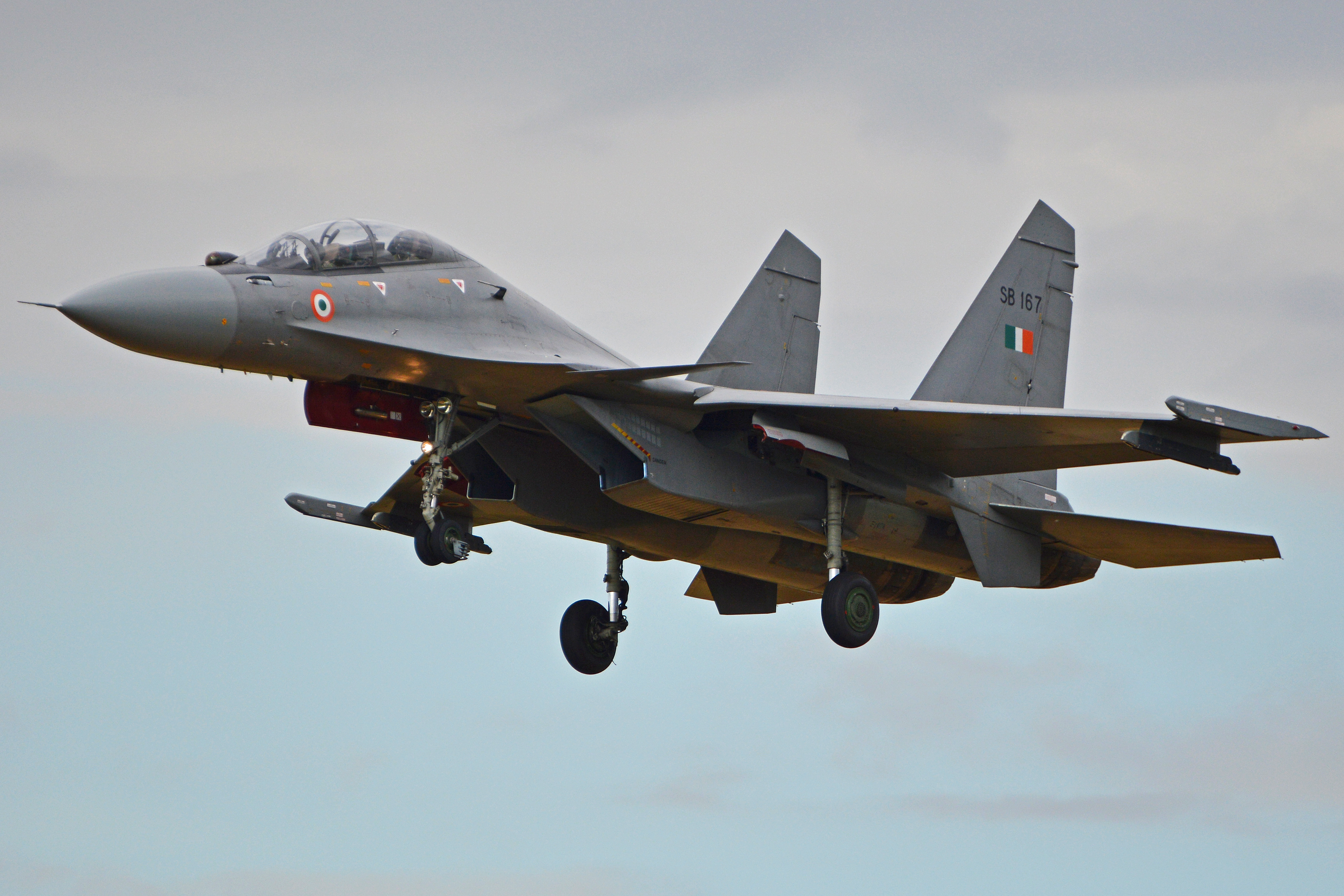
HAL made Su-30MKI

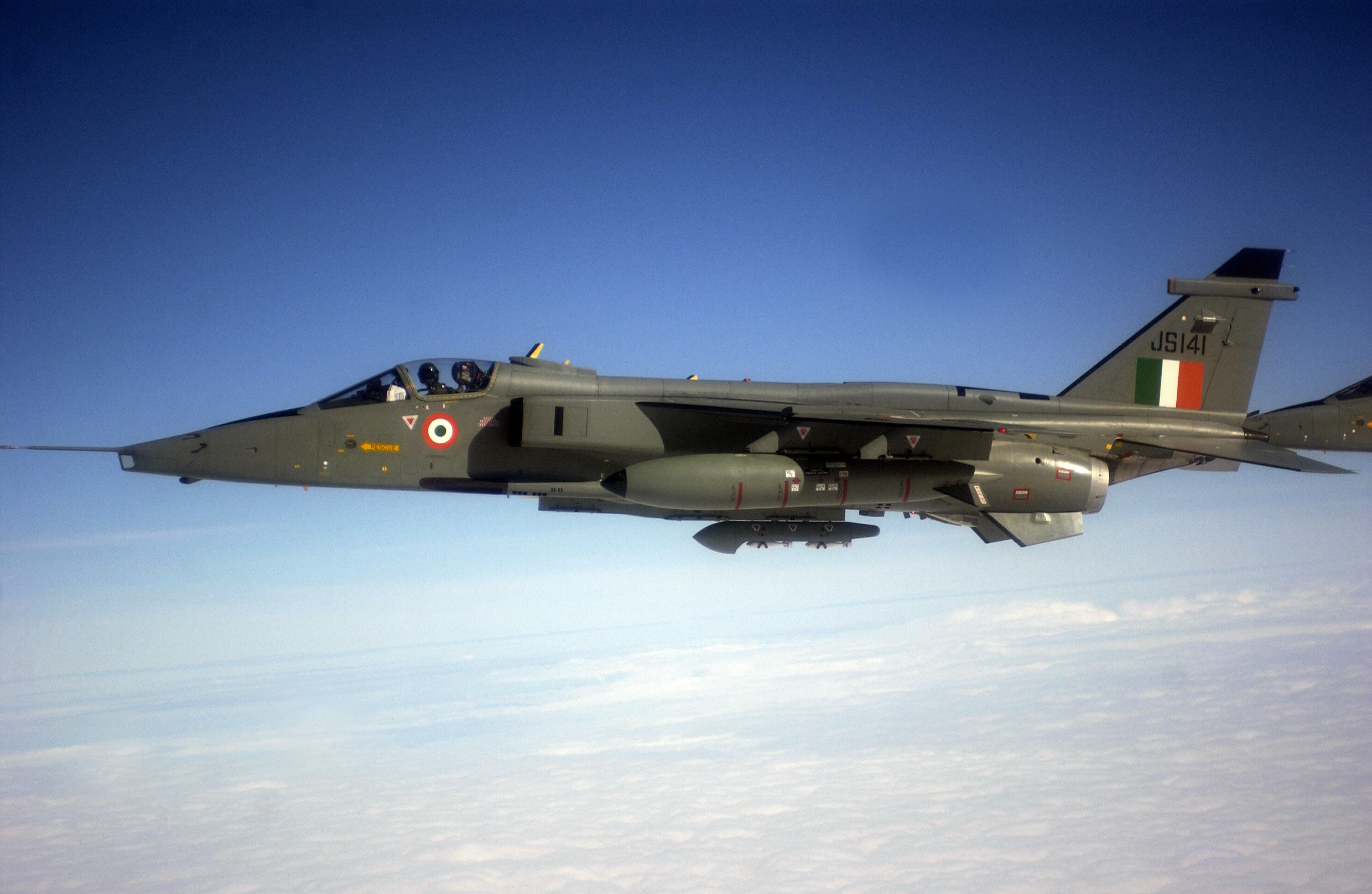
HAL made Jaguar

- De Havilland Vampire — (retired) first combat jet manufactured by HAL, 250+ FB.52, 60 T.55 models
- Folland Gnat — (retired) Over 175 manufactured by HAL.
  - HAL Ajeet —(retired) improved version of the Folland Gnat, 89 manufactured by HAL
- Mikoyan-Gurevich MiG-21 —(retired) FL, M, Bis and UPG upgrades variants 660 manufactured in Nasik.
- Mikoyan-Gurevich MiG-27 —(retired) A total of 150 ML variant were manufactured in Aircraft Manufacturing Division, Nasik
- SEPECAT Jaguar — (Out of production) IS, IB and IM variants (89 IS, 27 IB and 12 IM variants built)
- Sukhoi Su-30MKI — (In Service) a derivative of the Sukhoi Su-30 (272 delivered, 12 on order). Manufactured in Aircraft Manufacturing Division, Nasik

==== Trainer aircraft ====
- Harlow PC-5 — first aircraft assembled by HAL
- Percival Prentice — 66 built by HAL
- BAE Hawk Mk 132 — The type and its engines are produced under license; proposed to be developed into Hawk-i fighter-trainer aircraft.

==== Passenger, transport, and utility aircraft ====
- HS 748 Avro — (being retired) modified for military usage, includes Series 2M variant with large freight door. Produced at Transport Aircraft Division, Kanpur.
- Dornier 228 — (under production) 117 built with additional fuselage, wings, and tail unit for production of the upgraded Dornier 228 NG variant. Sometimes referred to as HAL 228. Several variants, including Maritime Surveillance and Utility versions under production in at Transport Aircraft Division
- Yakovlev SJ-100 — TBA

==== Helicopters ====
- Aerospatiale SA 315B Lama — HAL Cheetah, Lancer, Cheetal Variants
- Aerospatiale SA 316B Alouette III — HAL Chetak, Chetan Variants

==== Engines ====
===== Turbofan Engines =====
- Rolls-Royce Turbomeca Adour Mk 811 — licence produced at Engine Division Bangalore (SEPECAT Jaguar)
- Rolls-Royce Turbomeca Adour Mk 871 — licence produced at Engine Division Bangalore (BAE Hawk Mk 132)
- Garrett TPE331-5 — licence produced at Engine Division Bangalore (Dornier 228)
- Tumansky R-25 — licence produced at Engine Division Koraput (Mikoyan-Gurevich MiG-21)
- Klimov RD-33MK — licence produced at Engine Division Koraput (Mikoyan MiG-29)
- Saturn AL-31FP — licence produced at Sukhoi Engine Division Koraput (Sukhoi Su-30MKI)
- General Electric F414-GE-INS6 — negotiations for licensed production in Bangalore underway (HAL Tejas, HAL TEDBF, HAL AMCA)

===== Turboshaft Engines =====
- Turbomeca TM 333 — licence produced at Engine Division Bangalore (HAL Dhruv, HAL Cheetal)

== Notable people ==
- Kota Harinarayana (b. 1943), president of the Aeronautical Society of India and chief designer of HAL Tejas
- Kurt Tank (1898–1983), German aeronautical engineer, designed Hindustan Marut fighter-bomber
- Roddam Narasimha (1933–2020), aerospace scientist and fluid dynamicist
- Vishnu Madav Ghatage (1908–1991), one of the pioneers of Indian aeronautics

== See also ==
- HAL Aerospace Museum
- Pragati Aerospace Museum
- Defence Research and Development Organisation
- HAL Airport
- Indian Space Research Organisation
- Central Aircraft Manufacturing Company
- Hindustan Aeronautics Limited SC
- National Aerospace Laboratories
- Mahindra Aerospace
- Tata Advanced Systems
- Aeronautical Development Agency
- HAL SC
