= HAL RUAV-200 =

Unmanned rotorcraft project developed by Hindustan Aeronautics Limited

HAL RUAV-200 (Rotary Unmanned Aerial Vehicle) is an unmanned rotorcraft project being developed by Hindustan Aeronautics Limited for the Indian Army and the Indian Navy.

== Development ==
=== IAI-HAL NRUAV ===
IAI-HAL NRUAV (Naval Rotary Unmanned Aerial Vehicle) was an unmanned rotorcraft project being co-developed by Malat Solutions, a unit of IAI of Israel, and HAL of India for the Indian Navy. The programme served as a precursor to the current RUAV-200 programme.

The project consisted of a Malat-made Helicopter Modification Suite (HeMoS) fitted on HAL's Chetan, an upgraded Chetak with Turbomeca TM 333 2M2 engines. The helicopter was planned to be used for unmanned operations and advanced intelligence, surveillance and reconnaissance (ISR) missions from warship decks.

IAI-HAL NRUAV will feature Autonomous Vertical Take-off and Landing (AVTOL) to operate from helicopter deck-equipped warships and from unprepared landing sites. It is intended to be employed as an elevated mast, which will extend the vessel's coverage over a much larger area, providing early warning and detection of aircraft, cruise missiles, surface vessels and even subsurface activities. It is planned to have an endurance of 6 hours and up to a distance of 120 km from the launching vessel. The system is being designed to carry a variety of ISR payloads including SAR, EO, and SIGINT. The project was initiated in late 2008, to be completed in 36-48 months with a budget of ₹1,163 crore (US$138 million). The project was being funded by the Indian Ministry of defense

In October 2010, it was reported that the programme is plagued by the lack of a correct landing and take-off system for moving platforms such as the decks of warships and had run into serious delays.

It was reported in February 2017, that the programme contract with IAI had been cancelled and was being further developed in collaboration with Aeronautical Development Establishment (ADE).

==== Specifications ====
General characteristics

- Length: 12.84 m (42 ft 2 in)
- Height: 3.09 m (10 ft 1.75 in)
- Max takeoff weight: 2,200 kg (4,850 lb)
- Powerplant: 1 × Turbomeca TM 333 turboshaft, 736 kW (987 hp)
- Main rotor diameter: × 11.02 m (36 ft 1.75 in)
- Main rotor area: 95.38 m^{2} (1,026.7 sq ft)

Performance

- Maximum speed: 100 km/h (62 mph, 54 kn)
- Range: 150 km (93 mi, 81 nmi)
- Endurance: 6 hours
- Service ceiling: 15,000 m (49,000 ft)

=== HAL RUAV-200 ===
By February 2019, a full-scale prototype of RUAV-200 was developed and unveiled at the Aero India 2019. The programme was awaiting clearance for a preliminary design review. HAL was being assisted by IIT Kanpur and Aeronautical Development Establishment (ADE) of DRDO. The intended user was extended to the Indian Army as well as the Navy. The drone, weighing 200 kg (440 lb), has been equipped with a two rotor blade design and a petrol aero-engine. As reported, the UAV features FADEC controls and SLR-DC datalink as well as autonomous mode for flying and take-off and landing.

As per a report in 2023, the UAV is expected to cater for the Army's need for "robust military-grade drones" for deployment at high-altitude regions. The Army has issued a requirement for 163 High Altitude (launch altitiude: >4,000 m (13,000 ft)) and 200 Medium Altitude (launch altitiude: >3,000 m (9,800 ft)) Logistics Drones. HAL has officially designated RUAV-200 as Logistics Drone (High Altitude) or {LD(HA)} for its Army variant. Army also needs at least 50% indigenous content (costwise).

The UAV can also perform advanced reconnaissance operations for armoured columns as well as artillery units. It is equipped with electro-optical day/night camera as payload for similar roles The UAV has a operating temperature range of -35°C to +55°C.

HAL also plans to develop an armed drone variant based on the design with network-centric warfare operations capabilities. The UAV could be equipped with machine guns, anti-tank missiles as well as air to surface missiles.

== Specifications (RUAV-200) ==
Data from , Financial Express

General characteristics

- Capacity: 40 kg
- Length: 4.2 m (13 ft 9 in)
- Max takeoff weight: 200 kg (441 lb)
- Powerplant: 1 × 52 kg petrol engine, 34 kW (46 hp)
- Propellers: Turboshaft

Performance

- Maximum speed: 200 km/h (120 mph, 110 kn)
- Range: 400 km (250 mi, 220 nmi)
- Endurance: 3
- Service ceiling: 6,000 m (20,000 ft)
