= DRDO Lakshya =

Indian target drone system

Lakshya PTA
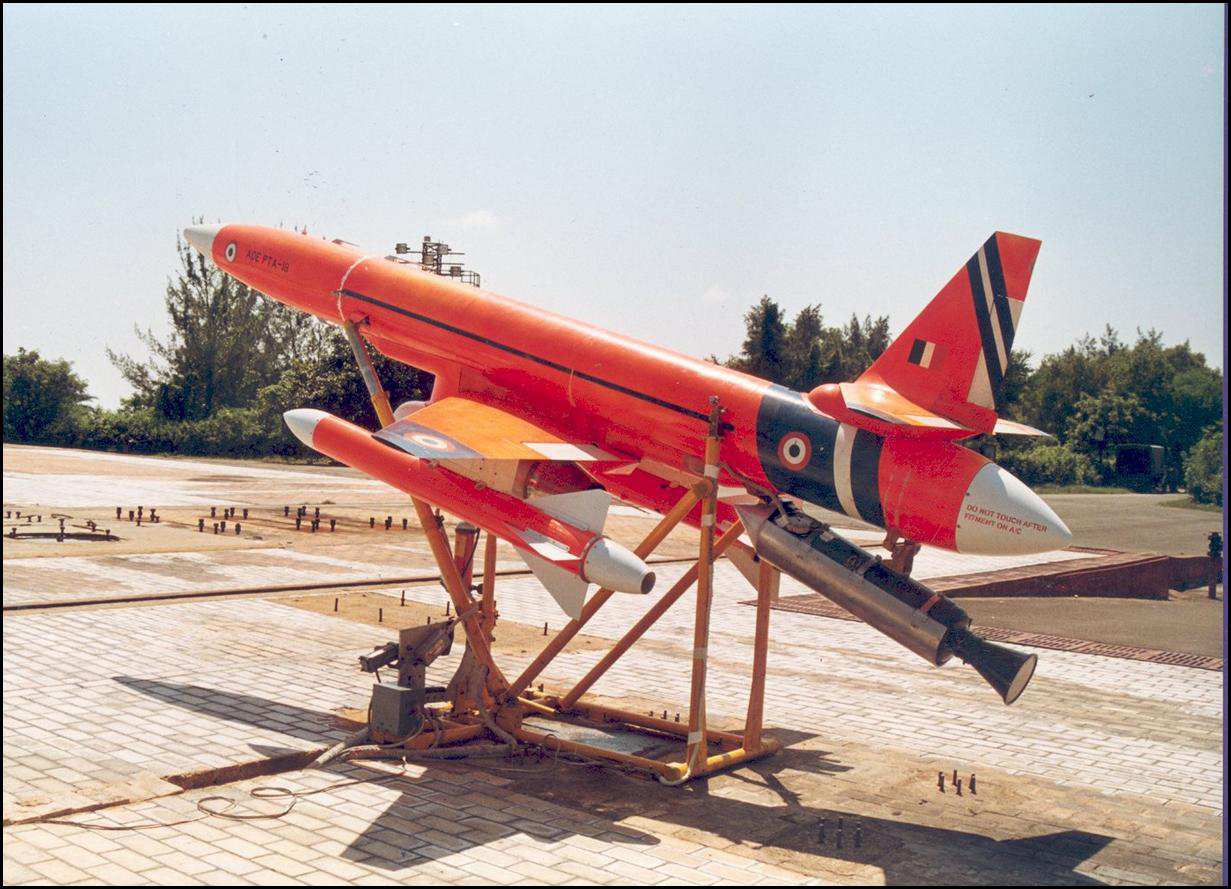

General information
- Type: Target drone
- Manufacturer: Hindustan Aeronautics Limited
- Designer: Aeronautical Development Establishment
- Status: Active
- Primary user: Indian Army; Indian Air Force; Indian Navy

History
- Manufactured: 30
- Introduction date: 9 November 2000
- First flight: 1985

Lakshya (lit. 'Target') is a remotely piloted high speed Indian target drone system developed by the Aeronautical Development Establishment (ADE) of DRDO. A variant Lakshya-1 is used to perform discreet aerial reconnaissance of battlefield and target acquisition.

The drone is remotely piloted by a ground control station and provides realistic towed aerial sub-targets for live fire training. The drone is ground- or ship-launched from a zero length launcher. Recovery is by a two-stage parachute system developed by ADE (DRDO), for land- or sea-based recovery. The drone has a crushable nose cone, which absorbs the impact of landing, minimizing damage. The flight path may be controlled or pre-programmed, based upon the type of mission.

== Development ==
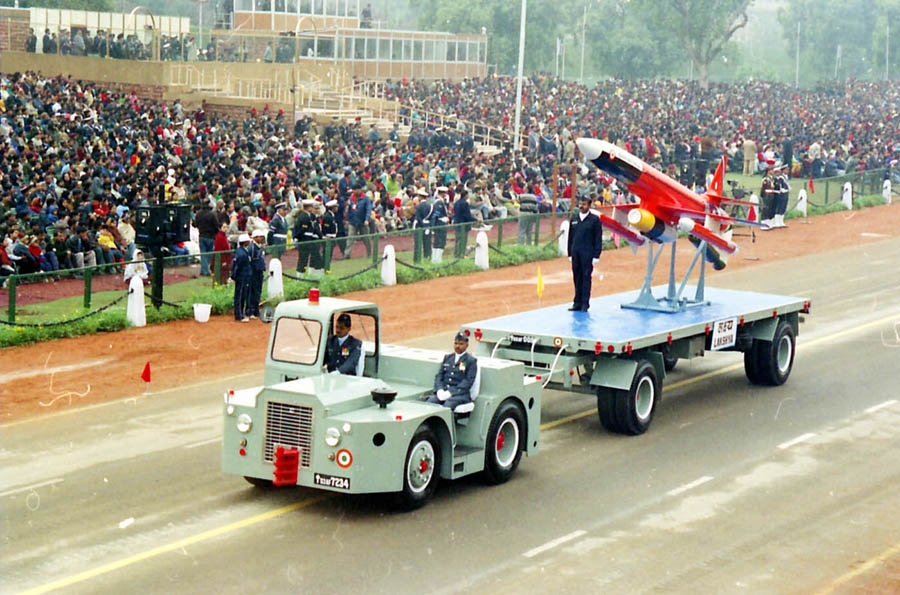
The 'Lakshya' India's indigenously developed Unmanned Ariel Vehicle (UAV) passing through the Rajpath during the full dress rehearsal for Republic Day Parade -2004, in New Delhi on 23 January 2004

The requirement for a pilotless target aircraft (PTA) arose in 1976. Feasibility studies were carried out by ADE to provide for a target system that met the requirements of all 3 services of the armed forces. An Inter Services Qualitative Requirement (ISQR), common to the three Services, was formulated by a Working Group constituted by the Ministry of Defence in January 1977 and 35 ISQR points were identified. Subsequently, based on a feasibility study carried out by ADE, the project for the design and development of Inter-Services PTA by ADE, satisfying the ISQR was sanctioned by Government in September 1980 at a cost of ₹170 million (US$1.8 million) including a foreign exchange element of ₹80 million (US$854,640.00). The development activity was planned for completion within five years.

=== PTAE-7 jet engine ===
In parallel, a development project for indigenous development of PTA Engine (PTAE-7) was also sanctioned at an estimated cost of ₹45 million (US$480,735.00) to Hindustan Aeronautics Limited (HAL) in September 1980, based on a feasibility study and project proposal submitted by HAL. The engine was to be developed by HAL by September 1985, concurrently with the PTA. HAL announced the successful trial of the indigenously-designed and developed remote-controlled PTAE-7 jet engine on 24 January 2001.

Between December 1985 and July 1986, four Lakshya PTA prototypes powered by Microturbo TRI-60-5 engines were launched for trials. While the first two launches were successful for planned flight times of 20 and 38 minutes respectively, the next two launches failed. By June 1994, 18 Lakshya PTA prototypes were fabricated by ADE itself and 43 trials were conducted, 24 of which were between December 1985 and February 1992. Due to rigorous evaluation and stringent quality control, a total of 10 prototypes were lost during the testing phase between 1985 and 1990. The project was formally closed in June 1994 and a final closure report was issued in April 1995 after incurring a total expenditure of ₹218.2 million (US$2.3 million). The first 6 Lakshya drones were given to the Indian Air Force in 1998. Laskhya units are manufactured and overhauled at HAL's Aircraft division, Bangalore. The Lakshya was formally inducted into the services by CAS AY Tipnis, on 9 November 2000 at Interim test range (ITR) Chandipur. On 9 May 2002, an upgraded version of the Laskhya featuring the new engine from HAL was flown from ITR Chandipur, bringing user trials to a close. On 6 November 2002, HAL announced that they had received an initial order for 25 Lakshya drones and that limited series production to satisfy the order for all three services had already begun. By 16 January 2003, the drone had completed over 100 flights.

A modified reconnaissance version of the Lakshya is under development. This version was fitted with oblique cameras and a digital onboard computer with a faster data-link enabling the drone to carry out completely autonomous operations. The development of this version was formally announced by Dr VK Aatre, then Scientific Adviser to the Defence Minister, during his lecture on "Evolving Battlefields and Role of Technology" organized by Bangalore Science Forum on 5 July 2003.

India's Aeronautical Development Establishment (ADE) has just announced the successful flight test of a Lakshya-2 pilotless targeting drone. According to a DRDO statement on 21 dec 2010, "Users have indicated their requirement of flying pilotless target aircraft at very low altitudes (15 to 25 metres above sea level) to simulate the trajectory of low-level cruise missiles. Accordingly ADE has prepared Lakshya-2 with necessary hardware and software to meet those requirements."

The 20 Dec flight test lasted 32 minutes at a range of 10-km. The DRDO statement said, "The flight was stable and well-controlled. A mobile launcher to launch the PTA from anywhere, and GPS to locate for recovery were used successfully." The Lakshya-2 also demonstrated several manoeuvers. The system has been designed so that two Lakshya targets can be flown and controlled by the common ground control station.

== Operational history ==
Indian Air Force has received the aircraft, ground systems and expendables in September 1999 and Indian Navy was scheduled to receive its first deliveries in November 2000. 23 Pilotless Target Aircraft Lakshya have been inducted into the defence services. In Service, the Lakshya replace the American Northrop BQM-74 Chukar drones for training.

The production cost of one aircraft is 29,375,000 Rupees (US$450,000). Some countries, like Singapore, Malaysia and Israel have expressed interest for "paid demonstration" of the Lakshya aircraft as a target. A similar "paid demonstration" was conducted for Israel's Air Force during the year 2002. This information was given by the Defense Minister AK Antony on 5 September 2007.

== Status ==
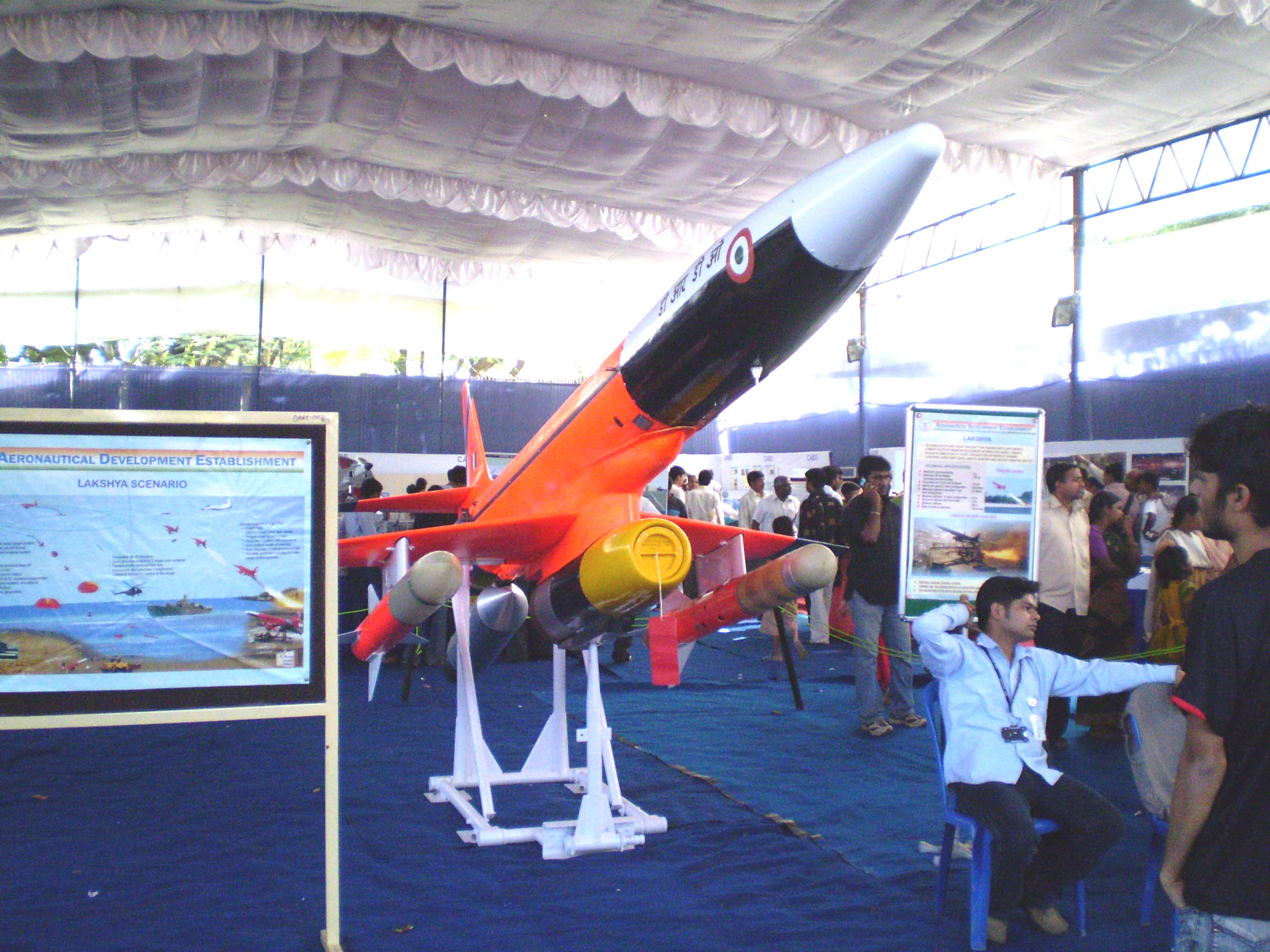
A Lakshya drone in 2008.

The advanced version of pilotless target aircraft (PTA) Lakshya-II was again successfully flight- tested at the Integrated Test Range (ITR) on 27 January 2012. The 11th flight demonstration was held from a mobile vehicle at launch complex-3 of the ITR, about 15 km from here. According to defence sources, the entire flight was pre-programmed and was totally successful.

Lakshya-II flew at sea skimming height of about 15 meters. In a flight lasting over 30 minutes, it was made to dive down from an altitude of around 800 m to just 12 m and maintained the requisite altitude for the specified time before demonstrating auto climb-out. It demonstrated various technologies and sub-systems to prevent loss of mission, engaging and flying in way point navigation mode while carrying tow targets. During the flight, one of the tow targets was released and the other was deployed while way point navigation was on.

Lakshya-II has been designed and developed by Bangalore- based Aeronautical Development Establishment, a premier DRDO lab specialising in UAVs and flight control systems.

On 23 August 2012, Air Force version of Lakshya-1 fitted with an advanced digitally controlled engine was test-flown to check the validity of its engine and duration enhancement. The drone flew over 30 minutes.

On 16 March 2017, Air Force version of Lakshya-2 was successfully test-flown for 30 minutes from the Integrated Test Range, Odisha.

== Operators ==
India

- Indian Air Force (15 units)
- Indian Navy (5 units)
- DRDO (10 units)

== Specifications (Lakshya PTA) ==
General characteristics

- Length: 2.385 m (7 ft 10 in)
- Wingspan: 5 m (16 ft 5 in)
- Wing area: 2.27 m^{2} (24.4 sq ft)
- Airfoil: NACA 64 A 008
- Max takeoff weight: 705 kg (1,554 lb)
- Powerplant: 1 × HAL PTAE-7 turbojet, 3.73 kN (840 lbf) thrust

Performance

- Maximum speed: Mach 0.7
- Range: 150 km (93 mi, 81 nmi)
- Service ceiling: 9,000 m (30,000 ft) 5,000 m (16,404 ft) with towed target
- Rate of climb: 25 m/s (4,900 ft/min)
- Launch: Rocket Assisted
- Recovery: Two stage parachute

== See also ==
- DRDO Abhyas – Derived from Lakshya's tow body
