= List of Indian aircraft =

All aircraft produced by India

The article constitutes most of notable aircraft produced by India. Since its independence, India has designed and produced a number of civilian and military aircraft. State-owned Hindustan Aeronautics Limited (HAL) remains the largest manufacturer of aircraft in country.

== Trainers ==
| Name and designation | Image | Manufacturer | First flight | Status | Number built | Notes | Ref (s) |
|---|---|---|---|---|---|---|---|
| HAL HT-2 | | Hindustan Aeronautics Limited | 5 August 1951 | Retired | 172 | | |
| HAL Pushpak (HUL-26) | | Hindustan Aeronautics Limited | 28 September 1958 | In limited use as private aircraft | 160+ | | |
| HAL Kiran (HJT-16) | | Hindustan Aeronautics Limited | 4 September 1964 | In service | 190 | | |
| HAL Deepak (HPT-32 and HTT-34) | | Hindustan Aeronautics Limited | 6 January 1977 | In service | 125 | HTT-34, the Turboprop variant of aircraft was introduced in 1984 | |
| HAL HTT-35 | | Hindustan Aeronautics Limited | - | Cancelled | 0 | Envisaged as replacement of HPT-32, never built. | |
| HAL Sitara (HJT-36) | | Hindustan Aeronautics Limited | 7 March 2003 | Limited series production | 16 | Induction due for 2023 | |
| HAL HTT-40 | | Hindustan Aeronautics Limited | 31 May 2016 | In development | 2 prototypes | Developed as replacement for HPT-32. Total 106 airframes are planned for Indian Air Force. | |
| HAL Combat Air Trainer (HJT-39) | | Hindustan Aeronautics Limited | Never flown | Cancelled | 0 | Dropped in favour of Hawk 132. | |
| HAL SPORT (Supersonic Omni Role Trainer Aircraft) | | Hindustan Aeronautics Limited | TBD | Designing phase | | Advanced trainer based on HAL Tejas fighter aircraft. | |
| HAL LIFT (Lead-In Fighter Trainer) | | Hindustan Aeronautics Limited | TBD | Proposed | | Advanced trainer based on HAL Tejas fighter aircraft. | |

== Civilian ==
=== Rotorcraft ===
| Name | Image | Manufacturer | Role | First flight | Status | Number built | Notes | Ref (s) |
|---|---|---|---|---|---|---|---|---|
| HAL Dhruv (ALH) | | Hindustan Aeronautics Limited | Utility helicopter | 20 August 1992 | In service | 335 | Number includes both military and civil aircraft | |

=== Fixed wing ===
| Name | Image | Manufacturer | Role | First flight | Status | Number built | Notes | Ref (s) |
|---|---|---|---|---|---|---|---|---|
| HAL Basant | | Hindustan Aeronautics Limited | Agricultural aircraft | 30 March 1972 | Out of production | 39 | | |
| NAL Hansa | | National Aerospace Laboratories (NAL) | Light trainer | 23 November 1993 | In production | 17 | | |
| NAL Saras | | National Aerospace Laboratories (NAL) | Airliner | 29 May 2004 | Mk1 in production, Mk2 in development | 2 prototypes | Mk2 proposed for flight in 2025 | |
| NAL NM5 | | National Aerospace Laboratories (NAL) and Mahindra & Mahindra | General aviation | 1 September 2011 | Cancelled | 1 prototype | | |
| HAL/NAL Regional Transport Aircraft (Indian Regional Jet) | | HAL and NAL | Airliner | TBD | In development | | | |

== Military ==
=== Rotorcraft ===
| Name | Image | Manufacturer | Role | First flight | Status | Number built | Notes | Ref (s) |
|---|---|---|---|---|---|---|---|---|
| HAL Dhruv (ALH) and variants | | Hindustan Aeronautics Limited | Utility helicopter | 20 August 1992 | In service | 335 | Number includes both military and civil aircraft | |
| HAL Rudra (Dhruv-WSI) | | Hindustan Aeronautics Limited | Attack helicopter | 16 August 2007 | In service | 91 (+75 on order) | Weaponized version of Dhruv | |
| HAL Prachand (Light Combat Helicopter) | | Hindustan Aeronautics Limited | Attack helicopter | 29 March 2010 | In production | 9 (+15 LSP and 162 choppers planned) | | |
| HAL Light Utility Helicopter | | Hindustan Aeronautics Limited | Light Utility Helicopter | 6 September 2016 | In production | 3 (187 planned) | | |
| Indian Multi Role Helicopter | | Hindustan Aeronautics Limited | Medium multirole helicopter | 2024-25 | Under development | | | |
| HAL Medium Combat Helicopter Program | | Hindustan Aeronautics Limited | Large attack helicopter | 2027 | Under development | | | |

=== Fixed Wing ===
| Name | Image | Manufacturer | Role | First flight | Status | Number built | Notes | Ref (s) |
|---|---|---|---|---|---|---|---|---|
| HAL Krishak (HAOP-27) | | Hindustan Aeronautics Limited | Surveillance aircraft | November 1959 | Retired | 70 | | |
| HAL Marut (HF-24) | | Hindustan Aeronautics Limited | Fighter-bomber | 17 June 1961 | Retired | 147 | | |
| HAL HF-73 | | Hindustan Aeronautics Limited | Strike fighter | Never flown | Cancelled | 0 | | |
| HAL Ajeet | | Hindustan Aeronautics Limited | Fighter aircraft | 30 September 1976 | Retired | 89 | | |
| HAL Tejas (Light Combat Aircraft) | | Hindustan Aeronautics Limited | Multirole combat aircraft | 4 January 2001 | In production | 40 (+83 on order) | | |
| HAL Tejas Mk2 (Medium Weight Fighter) | | Hindustan Aeronautics Limited | Multirole combat aircraft | 2026 (Expected) | Building prototypes | | | |
| HAL TEDBF (Twin Engine Deck Based Fighter) | | Hindustan Aeronautics Limited | Carrier-based fighter | 2026 (Expected) | Under development | | a derivative of TEDBF named HAL ORCA proposed for Indian Air Force | |
| HAL AMCA (Advanced Medium Combat Aircraft) | | Hindustan Aeronautics Limited | Stealth multirole fighter | 2028 (Expected) | Building prototypes | | | |

== Unmanned aerial vehicles ==
| Name | Image | Type | Role | Produced by | Status | Ref (s) |
|---|---|---|---|---|---|---|
| DRDO Kapothaka | | Fixed-wing UAV | Technology demonstrator | ADE | Retired | |
| DRDO Nishant | | Fixed-wing UAV | Reconnaissance | ADE | Out of service | |
| DRDO Fluffy | | Target drone | | ADE | Out of production | |
| DRDO Ulka | | Air-launched target drone | | ADE | In service | |
| DRDO Lakshya | | Target drone | | ADE | In service | |
| DRDO Abhyas | | High-speed Expendable Aerial Target (HEAT) or Target drone | | ADE | In production | |
| DRDO Imperial Eagle | | Fixed-wing | Mini-UAV | ADE | Flight tested only | |
| DRDO Netra | | Quadcopter | Mini-UAV | R&DE, ideaForge | In service | |
| NAL LCRA (Light Canard Research Aircraft) | | Fixed-wing UAV | Technology demonstrator | National Aerospace Laboratories | Retired | |
| DRDO Rustom | | Fixed-wing UAV | Medium Altitude Long Endurance (MALE) | ADE | Flight trials | |
| DRDO Archer (Weaponized Rustom-I) | | Fixed-wing UCAV | Medium Altitude Long Endurance (MALE) | ADE | Under development | |
| TAPAS-BH-201 (Rustom-II) | | Fixed-wing | Medium Altitude Long Endurance (MALE) | ADE | In production | |
| DRDO Ghatak | Prototype Swift | Stealth Flying wing UAV | Unmanned combat aerial vehicle | ADE | Prototype testing | |
| IAI-HAL NRUAV | | Rotorcraft | Unmanned naval helicopter | Hindustan Aeronautics Limited | Under development | |

== Ultralight ==
- X-Air
- X-Air Hanuman
- Raj Hamsa Voyager
- Raj Hamsa Clipper

== See also ==
- Indian Air Force
- Aviation in India
- Civil aviation in India
- Defence industry of India

== Bibliography ==
- Bridgeman, Leonard (1953). Jane's all the worlds aircraft 1953/4. Compiled and edited by Leonard Bridgman. Sampson Low, Marston & Co. Ltd., London 1953. 400 pp. 84s. net. Vol. 58. Cambridge University Press.
- Taylor, John W. R. (1965). Jane's All The World's Aircraft 1965–66. London: Sampson Low, Marston & Co., Ltd.
- Orbis (1985). "Part Work (1982-85)". Illustrated Encyclopedia of Aircraft. United Kingdom: Orbis Publishing. p. 2172.
- Partington, David (2013). Civil Aircraft Registers of United Kingdom, Ireland & IOM 2013. Tonbridge, Kent: Air-Britain (Historians) Limited. ISBN 978-0-85130-453-3.
- Donald, David; Jon Lake (1996). Encyclopedia of World Military Aircraft (Single volume ed.). London: Aerospace Publishing. ISBN 1-874023-95-6.
- Smith, Chris (1994). India's Ad Hoc Arsenal: Direction Or Drift in Defence Policy?. Oxford University Press. ISBN 0-1982-9168-X.
- Taylor, John W. R. (1982). Jane's All The World's Aircraft 1982–83. London: Jane's Yearbooks. ISBN 0-7106-0748-2.
- Taylor, John W. R. (1988). Jane's All The World's Aircraft 1988–89. Coulsdon, UK: Jane's Defence Data. ISBN 0-7106-0867-5.
- Lambert, Mark, ed. (1990). Jane's All the World's Aircraft 1990–91. Coulsdon, UK: Jane's Defence Data. ISBN 0-7106-0908-6.
- Taylor, Michael J. H. (1996). Brassey's World Aircraft & Systems Directory. London, England: Brassey's. ISBN 1-85753-198-1.
- Taylor, M.J.H. (ed,). Brassey's World Aircraft Systems Directory 1999/2000 Edition. London: Brassey's, 1999. ISBN 1-85753-245-7
- Taylor, M. J. H. (1999). Brassey's World Aircraft Systems Directory 1999/2000 Edition. London: Brassey's. ISBN 1-85753-245-7.
- Jackson, Paul (2004). Jane's All The World's Aircraft 2003–2004. United Kingdom: Jane's Information Group. ISBN 0-7106-2537-5.
- Taylor, John W. R. (1966). Jane's All The World's Aircraft 1966–67. London: Sampson Low, Marston & Company.
- Donald, David (1997). The Encyclopedia of World Aircraft. London: Sampson Low, Marston & Company. ISBN 1-85605-375-X.
- Gupta, Amit (1997). Building an Arsenal: The Evolution of Regional Power Force Structures. Greenwood Publishing Group. ISBN 0-2759-5787-X.
