= DRDO Imperial Eagle =

Type of aircraft

Imperial Eagle UAV

General information
- Type: Miniature UAV
- National origin: India
- Designer: Aeronautical Development Establishment; Council of Scientific and Industrial Research-National Aerospace Laboratories
- Status: Flight tested
- Primary users: National Security Guard Indian Army; Indian Air Force

History
- First flight: 25 January 2012

The Imperial Eagle is an Indian light-weight mini-unmanned aerial vehicle (UAV) developed by the Aeronautical Development Establishment, National Aerospace Laboratories and supported by private vendors. Its primary users will be the National Security Guard and the military services.

== Design and development ==
The Imperial Eagle weighs 2.5 kg and can carry either a daylight camera or thermal night vision camera. It was designed to be carried in soldier’s backpack, be hand-launched and recoverable through a soft landing. It is completely autonomous and can be programmed with navigational way-points, which can be changed in-flight by the ground control. With a ground tracker system, it is capable of providing continuous imagery of the on-board camera irrespective of the attitude of the aircraft.

The major advantage of the vehicle is that it functions on autopilot. Its orientation can be controlled using a dedicated real-time operating system (RTOS). Further, the UAV can be tracked using Automatic Gain Control or GPS-based systems. Patrolling across the target area, the UAV will send images day and night. Zooming in over the enemy area, the UAV can carry a payload of about 250 g and has an accuracy of 1 degree.

According to DRDO spokesperson Ravi Kumar Gupta, the UAV had been tested for several years, and the program has been deemed successful after the flight tests in January 2012.

== Collaboration with private industry ==
Many components of the UAV, like the autopilot, thermal camera, data links, trackers and the carbon composites air-frame were provided by the private industry in India.

== Operators ==
The unique features of Imperial Eagle have already caught the attention of several premier institutions and paramilitary wings. National Security Guard (NSG), Central Reserve Police Force (CRPF), National Institute of Disaster Management and home department of several states have shown interest in procuring the vehicle. ADE’s senior officers have already made a detailed presentation to NSG officials.

== Specifications ==
General characteristics

- Capacity: 0.25 kg (1 lb)
- Length: 1.2 m (3 ft 11 in)
- Empty weight: 2.3 kg (5 lb)
- Powerplant: 1 × wing-mounted turboprop engine

Performance

- Maximum speed: 90 km/h (56 mph, 49 kn)
- Cruise speed: 40 km/h (25 mph, 22 kn)
- Range: 15 km (9.3 mi, 8.1 nmi)
- Service ceiling: 4,600 m (15,000 ft)

== See also ==
- DRDO Netra
- NAL / ADE Golden Hawk
- NAL / ADE Pushpak
- NAL / ADE Black Kite
