= DRDO/IAI Pawan =

Indian unmanned aerial vehicle

The Pawan is a joint venture unmanned aerial vehicle (UAV) project being developed by India's ADE, a division of DRDO and the Israel Aircraft Industries, for the Indian Armed Forces which began in 2006. The Pawan will be comparable in size and capabilities to Israel's Elbit Hermes 180, EyeView and Silver Arrow drones. The 120-kilogram Pawan will have day-and-night surveillance capability, an endurance of five hours and a range of 150 kilometers.

ADE plans to build four Pawan prototypes under this development program, with Israel Aircraft Industries electro-optical sensors for the payload and its own stabilizer platform. The engine will be purchased from outside India.

Development costs of the short-range, vehicle-mounted Pawan is expected to be $33.2 million (U.S. dollars). with each nation contributing half of that sum. When the drone's development is finished, manufacture will take place in both India and Israel. The UAV will be able to carry one Sudarshan laser-guided bomb, two Astra BVR missiles, two Rudram SAAW weapons and even a light gun along with flares/chaff. Additionally, the UAV will be equipped to perform electronic countermeasures and electronic counter countermeasures, serve as a miniature AWAC, and even jam the incoming drone swarms of the enemies.

As of 2022 not much is known about its current status, it appears that the project has been shelved.

== See also ==
- DRDO Nishant
- DRDO Rustom
- DRDO Kapothaka
- DRDO Fluffy
- DRDO Ulka
- DRDO AURA
