= HAL/NAL Regional Transport Aircraft =

Regional airliner in development

Indian Regional Jet/Regional Transport Aircraft (RTA)

General information
- Type: Regional airliner
- Manufacturer: Hindustan Aeronautics Limited (HAL)
- Designer: National Aerospace Laboratories (NAL)
- Status: Under development

History
- Introduction date: 2026–27 (Expected)

The HAL/NAL Regional Transport Aircraft (RTA) or Indian Regional Jet (IRJ) is a regional airliner being designed by India's National Aerospace Laboratories (NAL), and to be manufactured by Hindustan Aeronautics Limited (HAL). The aircraft is planned to be a turboprop or a jet with a capacity of 80–100 passengers. Its basic version will have 80–90 seats (RTA-70) and the cost of the airliner will be 20 percent lower compared to its global competitors.

The 90 seater variant of the aircraft is being designed as of 2021 and is expected to enter service in 2026-27.

== Development ==
In 2007, Hindustan Aeronautics Limited (HAL) and the National Aerospace Laboratories (NAL) jointly designed and developed a 70-seater civil regional aircraft. NAL had held discussions with Pratt & Whitney (Canada) and General Electric (U.S.) for an engine. The NAL-designed RTA-70 is meant to fly short-haul routes and compete with planes of French-Italian aircraft maker Avions de Transport Régional (ATR), a leading exporter of turboprop aircraft to the Indian subcontinent.

In 2010 at the Indian Aviation exhibition held in Hyderabad, a proposed cabin was on display and more details on the specifications of the aircraft had been revealed. A High Powered Committee (HPC) with NAL becoming the nodal agency for the project. Chaired by G. Madhavan Nair, the HPC included industrialists like Arun Firodia and M. Damodaran.

On 23 December 2010, it was announced that the Indian government had asked NAL to consider the use of turbofan engines on the RTA-70. According to an NAL official, the use of a jet engine was seen as "a stepping stone to the high end" by the government.

In September 2019, it was reported that NAL was holding meetings with the Minister of Science and Technology for the plan of 70-seater civil aircraft. Regional transport aircraft has always been in the long-term vision. After getting in-principle approval from the Ministry of Science and Technology, Ministry of Civil Aviation, Ministry of Finance and the Prime Minister's Office, preliminary design phase will be completed in one-and-a-half year and will be submitted to government for approval. Further development was to start after government sanctions the project. In February 2021, it was announced that NAL had finally got permission to design and develop a 90 seater airliner and expecting operations of aircraft from 2026 onwards.

On 26 December 2024, it was reported that a Special-Purpose Vehicle (SPV) company will be established with stakeholders from both public and private sectors to develop and approve the design of India's first Commuter Aircraft with a range of 600–700 km (370–430 mi). The SPV, to be formed under Section 8 of the Companies Act, will decide whether to proceed with the RTA-90 programme or initiate a "clean sheet design". The Ministry of Civil Aviation has sought approval from the Ministry of Finance to form the entity. The SPV will have a tenure of 5 years and will not receive initial funding but will be funded later as it crosses "clearly defined milestones". Later, a single company or a Joint Venture (JV) entity will be selected to manufacture the aircraft under the SPV's guidance. The project is a part of the Bharatiya Vayuyan Adhiniyam, 2024. The National Aerospace Laboratory (NAL) is already designing the RTA-90 aircraft which is to be manufactured by Hindustan Aeronautics Limited (HAL).

On 21 January 2026, Moneycontrol reported that the Government is likely to allocate Rs 12,511 crore($1.36 billion) to set up a special purpose vehicle (SPV) for developing a regional transport aircraft, with the bulk of the money earmarked for certification, testing and infrastructure rather than just design. Breakdown of costs:

- Rs 750 crore will be allocated to rope in an international knowledge partner for design, certification and flight testing consultancy. The partner will provide consultancy to achieve FAR-25 standard for the aircraft.
- Rs 2,507 crore will allocated for certification of the aircraft.
- 1,981 crore for infrastructure facilities.
- 1,873 crore for ground testing of prototypes, and Rs 291 crore for flight testing.
- Spending on materials, bought-out items (BOIs), line-replaceable units (LRUs) and systems is pegged at Rs 240 crore.
- Rs 133 crore for prototype tooling and assembly jigs.
- Rs 465 crore for documentation and publication.
- Rs 680 crore for administration and establishment.
- The proposal also sets aside Rs 1,000 crore for indigenisation of systems, signalling a push to build domestic capability in aircraft components.
- A contingency of about Rs 480 crore, or around 5 percent of the project cost, has also been built into the plan.

On 27 January 2026, Embraer and Adani Aerospace & Defence signed a MoU for establishment development of an integrated regional transport aircraft ecosystem in India. The companies aim to collaborate on opportunities in aircraft manufacturing, supply chain, aftermarket services, and pilot training. The collaborative industrial partnership will aim to establish an assembly line, followed by a phased increase in indigenization to advance India’s Regional Transport Aircraft (RTA) program.

== Design ==
The aircraft is claimed to offer 25% lower acquisition costs, 25% lower operating costs and 50% lower maintenance costs than existing turboprop regional aircraft.

The 70-seat aircraft will have a range of 1,350 nm (2,500 km), and require a take-off field length and landing field length of 900m (2,950 ft). The aircraft would have a length of 28.6m and a wing-span of 29.4m. The aircraft would have a service ceiling of 30,000 ft, a cruising speed of 300kt, and the noise level would meet Stage 4 criteria.

The cabin, which would be able to seat four abreast, would have a width of 3.01m and height of 3.35m. The cargo hold would have a volume of 25m³ (880 ft^{3}).

NAL is considering a composite airframe. The aircraft will be powered by two "next-generation turboprop engine". It would have an indigenous fly-by-wire control system, open distributed modular avionics, automatic dependence surveillance - broadcast navigation capabilities, and advanced displays.

== See also ==
Related development

- NAL Hansa
- NAL Saras

Aircraft of comparable role, configuration, and era

- Antonov An-24/Xian Y-7/Xian MA60
- ATR 72
- Bombardier Dash 8
- British Aerospace ATP
- Fokker 50
- Ilyushin Il-114
- Saab 2000
- Xian MA700
- Indonesian Aerospace N-245
- IPTN N-250
- CASA 3000
