= NAL Slybird =

Aircraft technology

External images
- NAL Slybird
- Slybird
- Slybird

NAL Slybird is a mini-unmanned aerial vehicle (UAV) developed in India by National Aerospace Laboratories (NAL). Its primary users will be police and the military services.

NAL Slybird is hand launched and has a soft landing recovery capability. It has an endurance of one hour with a range of 10 km. Its operational altitude is 300 meters and a service ceiling altitude of 15000 feet. The craft is fitted with a forward looking pan-tilt day/Infrared camera.

There are two versions of the NAL Slybird to fit military and police roles. The smaller version is focused more towards the military by keeping the load of soldier down; it is designated A (military version). The larger version of the NAL Slybird is designated B (police version).

As of March 2013 the NAL Slybird prototypes were under user trials. The estimated cost for three aircraft and one ground station was to be $350,000.

| Parameter | A (Military Version) | B (Police Version) |
|---|---|---|
| Length | 1.2 m | 1.2 m |
| WingSpan | 1.6 m | 1.9 m |
| Weight | 2 kg | 2.5 kg |
| Payload | <1 | <1 |
