= NAL Saras =

Indian airliner

Saras
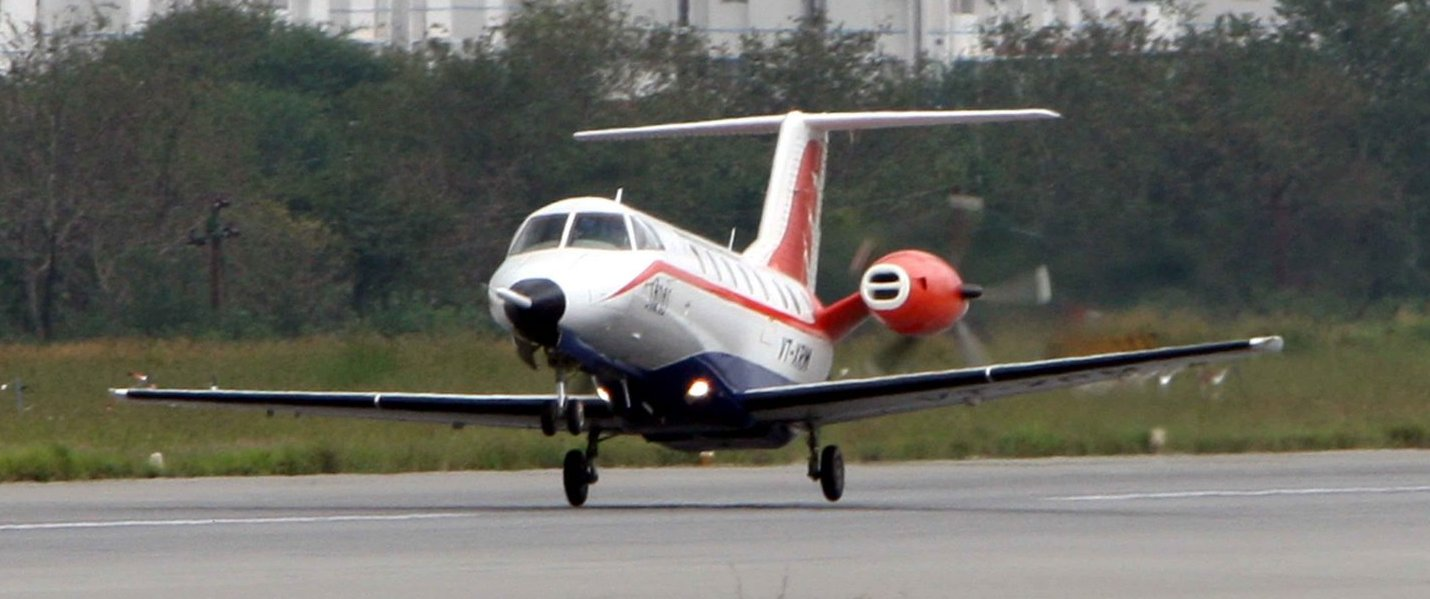
- NAL Saras taking off

General information
- Type: Business aircraft / Military transport aircraft
- National origin: India
- Manufacturer: Hindustan Aeronautics Limited
- Designer: National Aerospace Laboratories; Council of Scientific and Industrial Research
- Status: In production (Mk1)
- Primary users: Indian Air Force (intended) Indian Army (intended)
- Number built: 2 prototypes

History
- First flight: Mk1 - 29 May 2004; Mk2 (~2025, planned)

The NAL Saras (lit. 'Crane') is the first Indian multi-purpose civilian aircraft in the light transport aircraft category as designed by the National Aerospace Laboratories (NAL).

In January 2016, it was reported that the project had been cancelled. But in February 2017, the project was revived. In February 2019, India's Ministry of Finance approved ₹6,000 crore (US$640 million) for the production of the airliner.

== Development ==
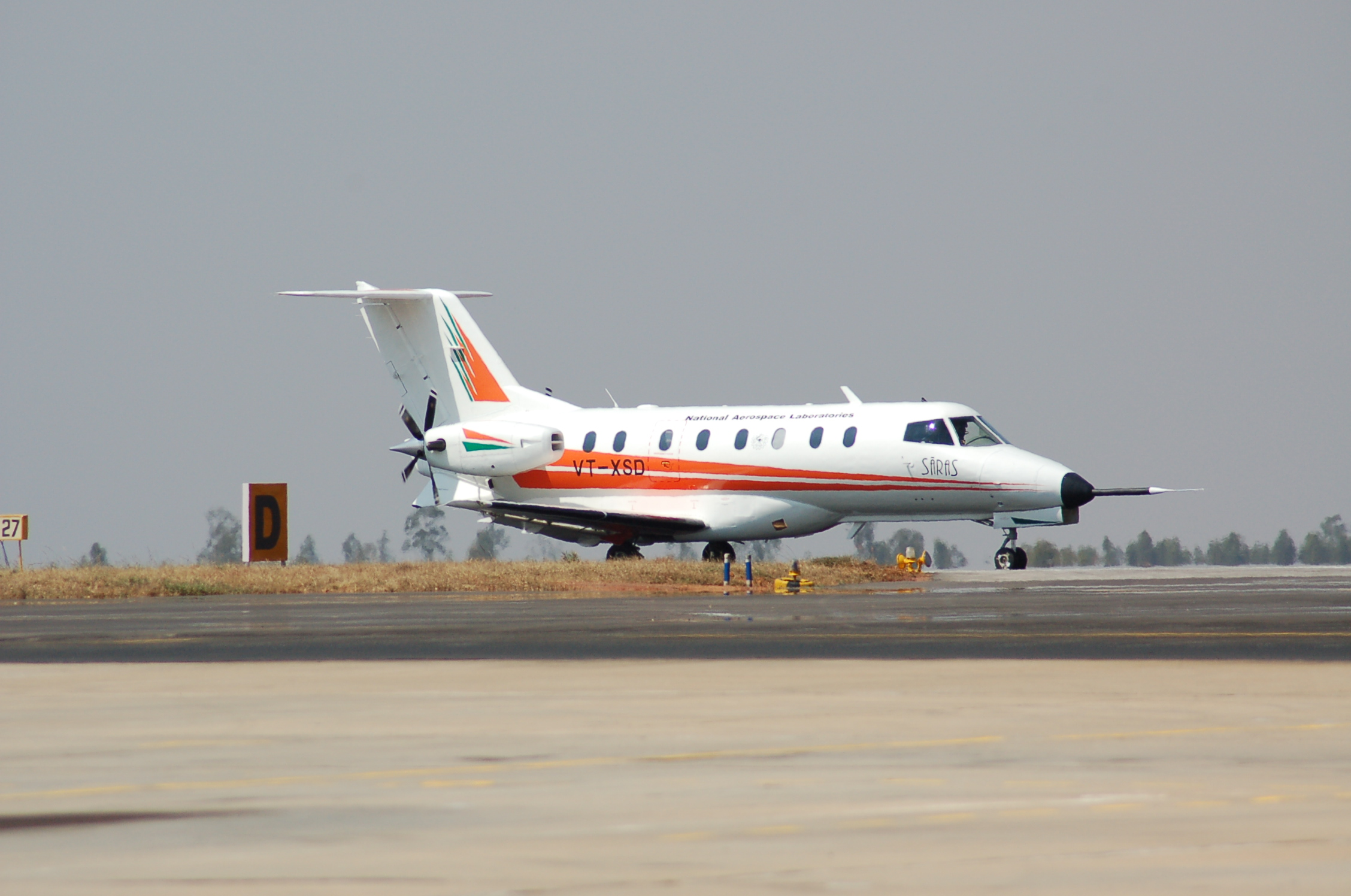
Saras at Yelahanka Air Force Station for Aero India 2007.

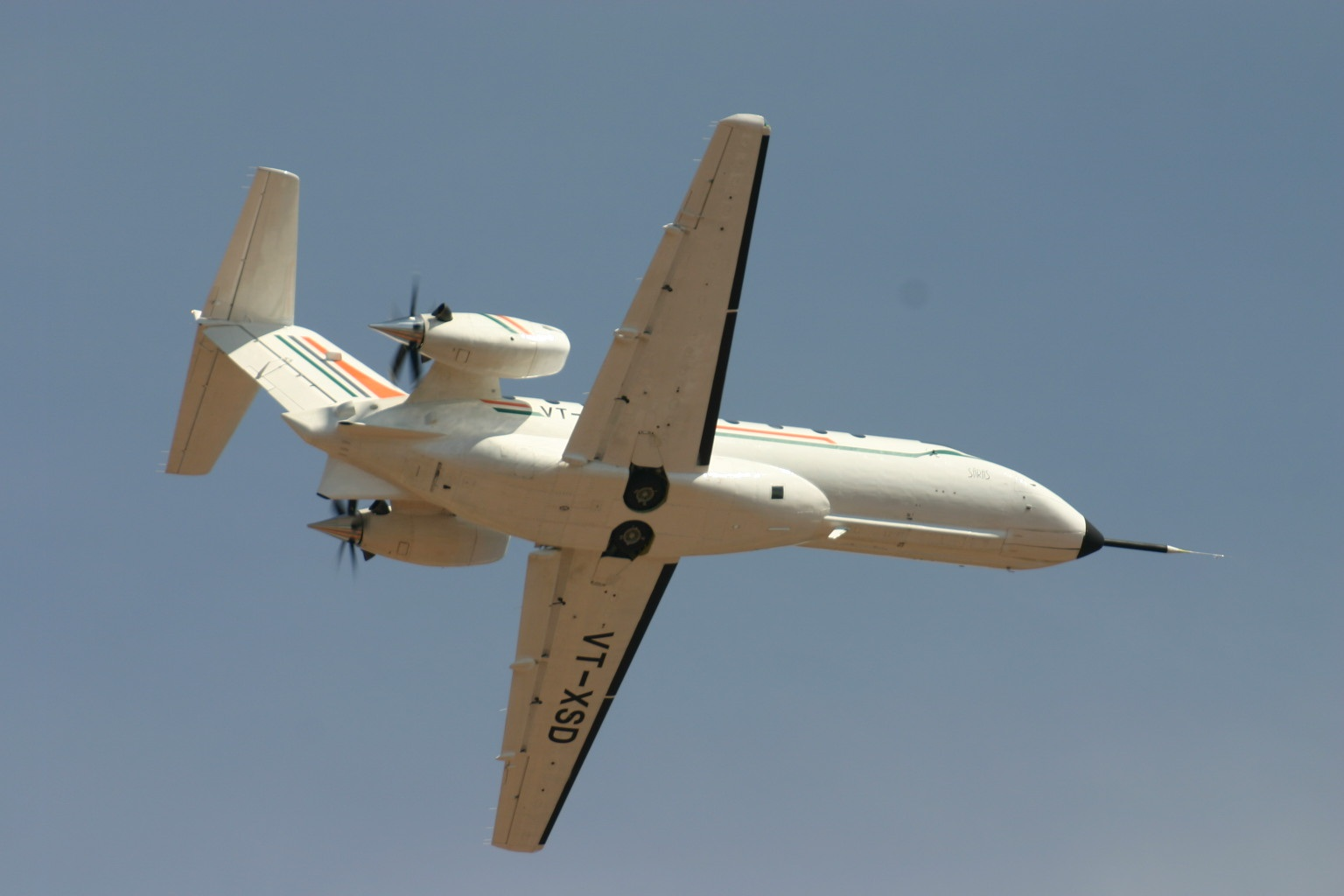
NAL Saras flying Overhead

In the mid-1980s, the Research Council recommended that the National Aerospace Laboratories (NAL) should study the civil aviation requirements of India and recommended ways of establishing a viable civil aviation industry. It further recommended that NAL should carry out a formal techno-economical feasibility study of a multi role light transport aircraft (LTA – renamed SARAS in October 1993). The feasibility study (November 1989) showed that there was a significant demand for a 9–14 seat multi-role LTA in the country and estimated a market potential of about 250–350 aircraft in the next 10 years. NAL submitted the feasibility study report to the Research Council in November 1990 and started its search for an industrial partner.

The project began in 1991 as a collaboration with Russia (Myasishchev had a similar project called the Duet), but financial trouble led the Russians to drop out early in the project. The project almost came to a halt when it was hit by US-imposed sanctions in 1998, after India's nuclear tests in Pokhran. The Saras project was sanctioned on 24 September 1999 with initial schedule of its maiden flight by March 2001. The first Saras (PT1) completed its maiden flight at the HAL airport in Bangalore on 29 May 2004.

The original design target parameters included a maximum take-off weight of 6,100 kg and a maximum payload of 1,232 kg, a high cruise speed of over 600 km/h, an endurance of six hours, a maximum flight altitude of 12 km (cruise altitude 10.5 km), short take-off and landing distances of about 600 m, a maximum rate of climb of 12 m/s, a low cabin noise of 78 dB, a range of 600 km with 19 passengers, 1,200 km with 14 passengers and 2,000 km with eight passengers, a high specific range of 2.5 km/kg and a low cost of operation of ₹ 5/km.

While the designed empty weight of the aircraft is around 4,125 kg, the first prototype weighed in around 5,118 kg. This issue is sought to be addressed by including composite wings and tail by the third prototype. The airframe of Saras-PT2 was built with lighter composites to reduce its overall weight by about 400 kg from its first prototype, which was overweight by about 900 kg. The aircraft is powered by two Canadian Pratt & Whitney turbo-prop engines mounted in the pusher configuration.

The first prototype will be upgraded to meet the latest design criteria including higher-power 1,200 hp (895 kW) Pratt & Whitney Canada PT6A-67A engines and improvements to the flight control and flight operations systems. The upgraded PT1 is due to make its first flight by the end of 2011 leading to certification and first deliveries in 2013 and 2014 respectively.

=== Revised version ===
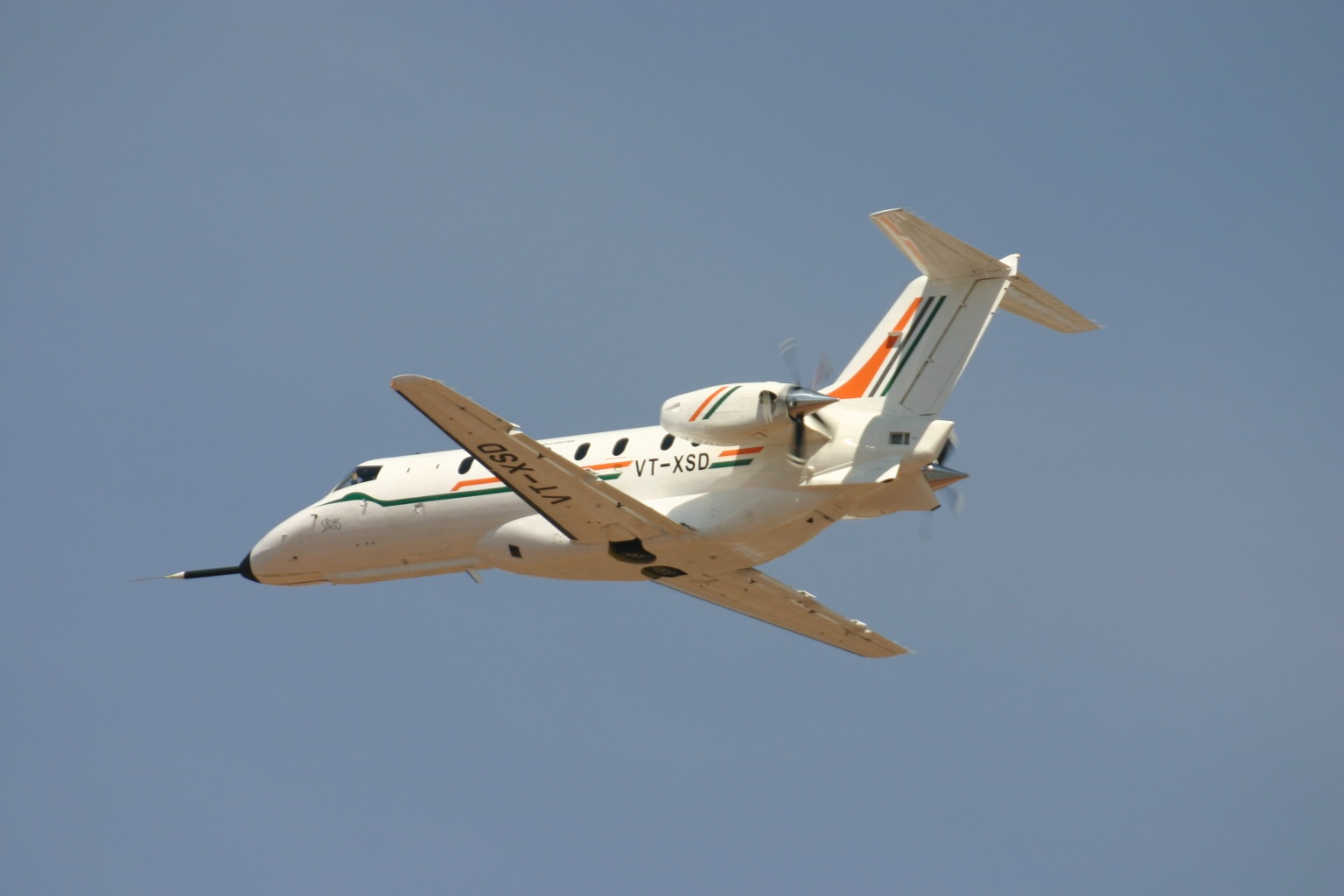
Saras during flight with pusher configuration.

As of 20 January 2016 National Aerospace Laboratories (NAL) had stopped all work on Saras as the funding for the project stopped by end of 2013. Engineers who were working on NAL Saras got redeployed to other ongoing similar projects with higher strategic importance.

The second prototype of the aircraft was overweight by 500 kg against the specified design weight of 4125 kg. The third prototype has yet to take flight. NAL was hoping to revive funding for the project.

In October 2016, it was reported that government is mulling a revival plan. The Council for Scientific and Industrial Research (CSIR), that had almost shelved the plan, is on a rethink mode with additional funding in the pipeline.

As of 14 February 2017, the reconfigured first prototype had been handed over to the IAF's Aircraft & Systems Testing Establishment (ASTE), which had conducted a few low-speed ground runs. The National Aerospace Lab's (NAL) director Jitendra J. Jadhav is said to be looking at putting the Saras back into the air by June–July, though officers on the programme seem to think August–September was a more likely timeframe.

An upgraded Saras undertook high speed taxi trial on 2 January 2018 at Bangalore.

The revised version with 14 seats instead of 19, Saras-PTN1, has improved avionics, radar, linear wing flap actuator, environmental control system, engine flap actuators and flight control system.

The revised prototype first flew on 24 January 2018 from HAL Airport for 40 minutes, reaching 8,500 ft (2,600 m) and 145 kn (269 km/h) before evaluating system performance over 20 flights to freeze the production design. In a press conference during Aero India 2019, it was revealed that ₹6,000 crores were released for the production of the aircraft as NAL had got the certification for its improved version recently. Weight was no longer an issue as team was successful in cutting down weight by 0.9 tonnes. The new version will also be fitted with better avionics. The second test flight lasted for 25 minutes was completed on 21 February 2018. Additional improvements include a pair of 1200 shaft horsepower engines and 104-inch diameter propeller to cater the requirement of second segment climb gradient. CSIR will collaborate with Defence Research and Development Organisation (DRDO) in developing an indigenous turboprop engine for Saras. Hindustan Aeronautics Limited (HAL) will manufacture Saras at its Kanpur facility.

=== Mark 2 ===
The CSIR-National Aerospace Laboratories, NAL is also engaged development of Saras Mk2, a 19-seater version of the airliner. Government has given clearance and fund requirement to NAL for development of same. NAL has completed basic testing for pre-production standard and aims for certification in 4 years to produce first aircraft in following one-and-a-half-year. Dassault Systèmes announced that NAL will be using 3DEXPERIENCE and DraftSight for cabin design, 2D/3D modelling, prototyping and laser cutting. Mark 2 will undergo wind tunnel testing in November 2019 with tractor configuration. Department of Scientific and Industrial Research (DSIR) demanded an additional grant of ₹100 crore for 2021–22. NAL is targeting ₹50 crore per unit cost for Saras Mk2 against ₹55 crore for Dornier 228 that has unpressurized cabin with altitude restriction. NAL wants the government to purchase 50-60 units to make manufacturing viable.

On 27 March 2022, NAL unveiled 16-seater air ambulance variant of Saras Mk2 at Wings India 2022 in Hyderabad. International Critical Care Air Transfer Team (ICATT) from Bengaluru signed letter of intent to purchase 2 units.

On 14 May 2022, NAL started taxi trials of locally developed digital anti-skid braking system on Saras PT1N that will help landing on shorter runways. A total of 15-20 trials are planned to check system performance. It is a state-of-art brake-by-wire electro-hydraulic braking system that is controlled by high-performance flight control computer. Upon validation, the system will be transferred on Saras Mk2. Paras Defence supplied complete glass avionics suite for Saras MK2 in March 2023.

In April 2024, NAL planned to have the Mark-2's maiden flight by late 2027, which was a delay from the target of 2026–27. NAL had reportedly bought most of the materials and fabrication would start only after release of drawings. While most of the components will be developed by NAL some would be outsourced to Hindustan Aeronautics Limited (metallic parts) and other vendors (fuselage sections). Avionics is being sourced from Genesis. Two prototypes are to be built whose first flight will follow one year-long taxi trials, or ground-based runs at various speeds. The Saras prototype PT1N will serve as a technology demonstrator from which NAL's brake management and environmental control will be derived.

As of 5 July 2026, the designing phase of the aircraft is completed and will feature pressurised cabin, glass cockpit, autopilot and command-by-wire flight controls. NAL will now manufacture a prototype of the design and is searching for a development partner for the same. While NAL has an inhouse division for manufacturing of composites, the development partner will deliver the metallic components.

== Orders ==
The IAF has signed up with National Aerospace Laboratories, Bangalore for the purchase of 15 Saras aircraft and may need 45 more. "NAL signed a memorandum of understanding with IAF to sell 15 Saras aircraft. The Kanpur unit of Hindustan Aeronautics Ltd will manufacture these planes", The aircraft would be used for coastal surveillance as well as training young cadets on transport flying.

₹6,000 crores were initially released in early 2019 for the production of aircraft. Initial order of 15 aircraft by IAF may go up to 120–140 in upcoming years.

== Operators ==
India

Indian Air Force – 60 aircraft (intended)

- Phase 1 – 15 aircraft
- Phase 2 – 45 aircraft

== Incidents and accidents ==
On 6 March 2009, 2 Indian Air Force test pilots, Wing Commander Praveen Kotekoppa and Wing Commander Dipesh Shah along with a Flight Test Engineer Squadron Leader Ilayaraja, were killed when the second prototype Saras aircraft operating Flight 49, crashed and caught fire in an open field near Bidadi, about 30 km from Bangalore. A court of inquiry found that wrong engine relight drills given to the pilots contributed to the crash, concluding that an "Incorrect relight procedure devised by the designer and adopted by the crew at insufficient height leading to rapid loss of altitude and abnormal behaviour of aircraft resulted into accident."

== Specifications (Saras Mk2) ==
Data from NAL,

General characteristics

- Crew: 3 (Pilot, Co-Pilot, Flight Engineer)
- Capacity: 19 passengers / 1,710 kg (3,770 lb)
- Length: 17.3 m (56 ft 9 in)
- Wingspan: 18 m (59 ft 1 in)
- Height: 5.5 m (18 ft 1 in)
- Wing area: 30.4 m^{2} (327 sq ft)
- Airfoil: NASA GA(W)-2 mod.
- Empty weight: 5,100 kg (11,244 lb)
- Max takeoff weight: 7,600 kg (16,755 lb)
- Fuel capacity: 1832 kg
- Powerplant: 2 × Pratt & Whitney Canada PT6A-67A turboprop engines, 895 kW (1,200 hp) each
- Propellers: 5-bladed MT-Propeller, 2.65 m (8 ft 8 in) diameter constant speed pusher propellers

Performance

- Maximum speed: 550 km/h (340 mph, 300 kn) at FL250
- Cruise speed: 485 km/h (301 mph, 262 kn)
- Stall speed: 145 km/h (90 mph, 78 kn) flaps down, power off at sea level
- Never exceed speed: 688 km/h (428 mph, 371 kn)
- Range: 2,350 km (1,460 mi, 1,270 nmi) with 45 min reserves and 8 passengers

590 km (367 mi; 319 nmi) with 14 passengers

- Ferry range: 2,400 km (1,500 mi, 1,300 nmi)
- Endurance: 6 hours * With 45 min reserve
- Service ceiling: 9,100 m (29,900 ft) maximum certified altitude
- Rate of climb: 10.17 m/s (2,000 ft/min)
- Wing loading: 237.4 kg/m^{2} (48.6 lb/sq ft)
- Takeoff distance: 670 m (2,200 ft)
- Landing distance: 900 m (3,000 ft)

Avionics
Integrated digital avionics system using ARINC 429 data bus interfaces
Full glass cockpit: EFIS-Four PFD/ ND/ MFDs
Comm/Nav suite: VHF-VOR and radio, ADF, DME, ILS
TAWS- Terrain Avoidance Warning System
FMS: Flight Management System
TCAS: Traffic Collision Avoidance System
Auto pilot and Weather Radar

== See also ==
Related development

- NAL NM5
- NAL Hansa
- Indian Regional Jet

Aircraft of comparable role, configuration, and era

- Beechcraft 1900
- Beechcraft Model 99
- Beechcraft Super King Air
- Dornier 228
- Embraer EMB 110
- Embraer/FMA CBA 123 Vector
- Evektor EV-55 Outback
- Piaggio P.180 Avanti

Related lists

- List of civil aircraft
- List of STOL aircraft
