= Kemrock =

Indian company

Kemrock Industries and Exports Limited
- Company type: Public company
- Industry: Manufacturing
- Founded: 1981; 45 years ago
- Founder: Kalpesh Patel
- Defunct: September 2017; 8 years ago
- Successor: Kalpesh Patel
- Headquarters: Vadodara, India
- Products: Composite materials
- Revenue: ₹4.7 billion (US$49 million) (FY10)
- Net income: ₹391 million (US$4.1 million)
- Owner: Public Company

Kemrock Industries and Exports Limited was an Indian public company specializing in the manufacture of fiber-reinforced composite materials. Established in 1981, the company was based in Vadodara, Gujarat.

== Products ==
Kemrock manufactured fibre-reinforced plastic and glass-reinforced plastic composite products for the domestic and export markets. It focused on industrial segments, such as aerospace, renewable energy, railways, chemical processing, waste management, etc.

Kemrock commissioned India's first carbon fiber production facility in 2010, under a technology transfer from the Council of Scientific and Industrial Research and National Aerospace Laboratories. Initial capacity at its plant in Vadodara was 400 tonnes of carbon fiber each year. It was one of the prime producers of FRP & GRP items.

Kemrock was acquired by Reliance Industries Ltd. in September 2017.
