= NAL/ADE Pushpak =

Aircraft technology

The NAL/ADE Pushpak is an unmanned Micro Air Vehicle (MAV) technology demonstrator developed jointly by Aeronautical Development Establishment (ADE) of DRDO and National Aerospace Laboratories (NAL) of CSIRI. It is one of the airframe designs being pursued for "National Program on Micro Air Vehicles" (NP-MICAV)

Pushpak is a fixed-wing aerial vehicle having platform shape of Dihedral Delta. Its airframe is made of GF/Kevlar. It has Pusher configuration and its propeller is behind the motor. It features Cleaner Aerodynamics, Nose-mounted payload, high endurance and low wing loading.

The Pushpak is powered by electric motor and has a flight endurance of half hour. It is equipped with a small camera which can record the activities on ground zero. It has an operational range of 2 km and can take video from an altitude of 100 m. It is remotely radio-controlled and an autopilot has also been provided. The prototypes are currently under flight trials as of 2012. It includes high tech GPS positioning systems which can track its trajectory and destination with shortest path and most secure trajectories.

== See also ==
- NAL / ADE Black Kite
- NAL / ADE Golden Hawk
