= NAL/ADE Golden Hawk =

Aircraft technology

The NAL/ADE Golden Hawk is an unmanned Micro Air Vehicle (MAV) technology demonstrator developed jointly by Aeronautical Development Establishment (ADE) of DRDO and National Aerospace Laboratories (NAL) of CSIR. It based on basic design of Shashank Misra and is one of the airframe designs being pursued for " National Program on Micro Air Vehicles" (NP-MICAV)

Golden Hawk is a fixed-wing aerial vehicle having platform shape of Cropped Delta. Its airframe is made of kevlar and Foam. The Golden Hawk is powered by Lithium polymer battery (1350mAh, 11.1 V, 3 cells) placed ahead of the wing. It has a speed of 10 to 15 m per second and have a flight endurance of half hour. It has tractor configuration and has its 25 watt brushless DC motor mounted with APC 7 x 5, 2 bladed propellers facing forward.

It is equipped with a powerful small camera which can record the activities on ground zero. It has an operational range of 2 km and can take video from an altitude of 80–100 m. It is remotely radio-controlled and an autopilot has also been provided. The prototypes are currently under the user trials as on 2012.

== See also ==
- NAL / ADE Black Kite
- NAL / ADE Pushpak
