= HAL HPT-32 Deepak =

Indian primary trainer aircraft

HPT-32
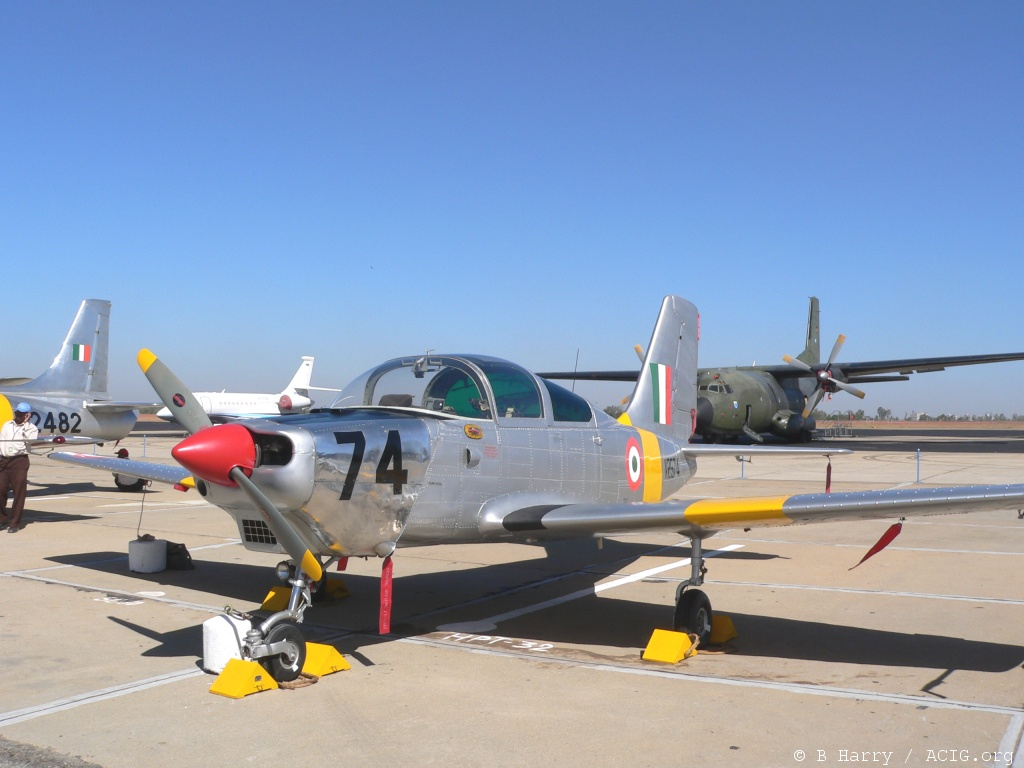
- A HPT-32 in an IAF Air Base

General information
- Type: Primary trainer
- National origin: India
- Manufacturer: Hindustan Aeronautics Limited
- Designer: Aircraft Research & Development Center (HAL)
- Primary user: Indian Air Force; Indian Naval Air Arm

History
- Manufactured: 1977-1993
- Introduction date: 1984
- First flight: 6 January 1977
- Retired: 2009
- Developed into: HAL HTT-40

The HAL HPT-32 Deepak (lit. 'Light') is an Indian prop-driven primary trainer manufactured by Hindustan Aeronautics Limited and are used as a basic trainer aircraft by the Indian Air Force and the Indian Navy. It has two seats in side-by-side configuration. Its configuration is low-wing, monoplane, single-engine aircraft designed primarily for the training of pilots in basic aerobatics, navigation, and other flying skills. The HPT-34 is equipped with a turboprop engine, offering good fuel efficiency and handling characteristics for new pilots.

However, it faced several challenges during its service. One of the major drawbacks was issues with the engine, leading to several accidents. As a result, the aircraft's service life was cut short, and it was gradually phased out in favor of more modern trainers, such as the HAL HTT-40.

== Operational history ==
The Deepak is used for primary training, observation, liaison and target towing.

When it flies upside-down fuel flows from a collector tank in the fuselage and the inverted flight is limited to 1 min. Deepak has a theoretical glide ratio of 8.5:1. The IAF and HAL are looking into new safety systems such as Ballistic Recovery Systems to enable it to descend safely in the event of an engine failure. On 16 May 2010 the IAF cleared the installation of a parachute recovery system. The HPT-32 aircraft has been replaced by the Pilatus PC-7 Mk II in the IAF, as its workhorse as a Basic Trainer Aircraft (BTA) in 2013.

== Accidents ==
In 17 Deepak crashes so far, 19 pilots have died. The Comptroller and Auditor General (CAG) of India has been reported as saying the aircraft is "technologically outdated and beset by flight safety hazards" when discussing the grounding of the fleet in 2009. HAL HTT-40 is going to replace HAL HPT-32 Deepak as primary trainer.

== Variants ==
HPT-32
Basic version, powered by Textron Lycoming EIO-540-D4B5 flat six piston engine
HTT-34
Turboprop version, powered by 310 kW (420 shp) Allison 250-B17D engine. First flew on 17 June 1984.

== Former Operators ==
India

- Indian Air Force 144
- Indian Navy 8

== Specifications (HPT-32) ==
Data from Jane's Aircraft Recognition Guide

General characteristics

- Crew: 2: student, instructor
- Length: 25 ft 4 in (7.7 m)
- Wingspan: 31 ft 2 in (9.5 m)
- Height: 9 ft 7 in (2.9 m)
- Wing area: 15.0 m² (162 ft²)
- Empty weight: 2,280 lb (1,034 kg)
- Max takeoff weight: 2,915 lb (1,322 kg) 1322 kg
- Powerplant: 1× Lycoming AEO-540-D4B5 piston engine, 260 hp (194 kW)

Performance

- Maximum speed: 175 mph (281 km/h)
- Range: 755 nm (1,400 km)
- Service ceiling: (18,045 ft)
- Rate of climb: (1100 ft/min)

Armament
Four hardpoints; 255 kg warload; machine gun pods; bombs; rockets

== See also ==
Related HAL development:

- HAL HTT-40
- HAL HUL-26 Pushpak
- HAL HT-2

Comparable or Related Basic Trainers:

- Pilatus P-3
- Beechcraft T-34 Mentor
- PAC CT/4 Airtrainer
- North American T-28 Trojan
