= NAL/ADE Black Kite =

Aircraft technology

The NAL/ADE Black Kite is an unmanned Micro Air Vehicle (MAV) technology demonstrator developed jointly by Aeronautical Development Establishment (ADE) of DRDO and National Aerospace Laboratories (NAL) of CSIRI and supported by private vendors. It is one of the airframe designs being pursued for " National Program on Micro Air Vehicles" (NP-MICAV)

== Design ==
Black Kite is a fixed-wing aerial vehicle having platform shape of Modified Inverse Zimmerman. Its airframe is made of Carbon-fiber-reinforced polymer and Rohacell. It runs on electric battery and is propelled by an AXi2204/54 Brushless Motor APC 7"x6" with a flight endurance of 30 minutes. The Black Kite is constructed with a tractor configuration and has its electric motor mounted with the propeller facing forward.

It carries a miniature daylight video camera as payload which can take video from an altitude of 80–100 m and relays the imagery of ground zero to the Ground control station during its flight. The video and telemetry range is about two km. The machine is remotely radio-controlled. An autopilot has also been provided, if it losses link with the Ground Control Station, it is programmed to return base. There are three versions of Black Kite. The prototypes are currently under the user trials.

== Specifications ==
Version	XL	M	S
Size:	Fits in 500mm Sphere	Fits in 325mm Sphere	Fits in 300mm Sphere
Wing Span:	432mm	316mm	262mm
Wing Area:	0.126 e6 mm2	0.059 e6 mm2	0.036 e6 mm2
Chord Length:	359mm	245mm	211mm
Aspect Ratio:	1.48	1.69	1.906

== See also ==
- NAL / ADE Golden Hawk
- NAL / ADE Pushpak
