= HAL HTT-40 =

Indian military turboprop trainer

HTT-40
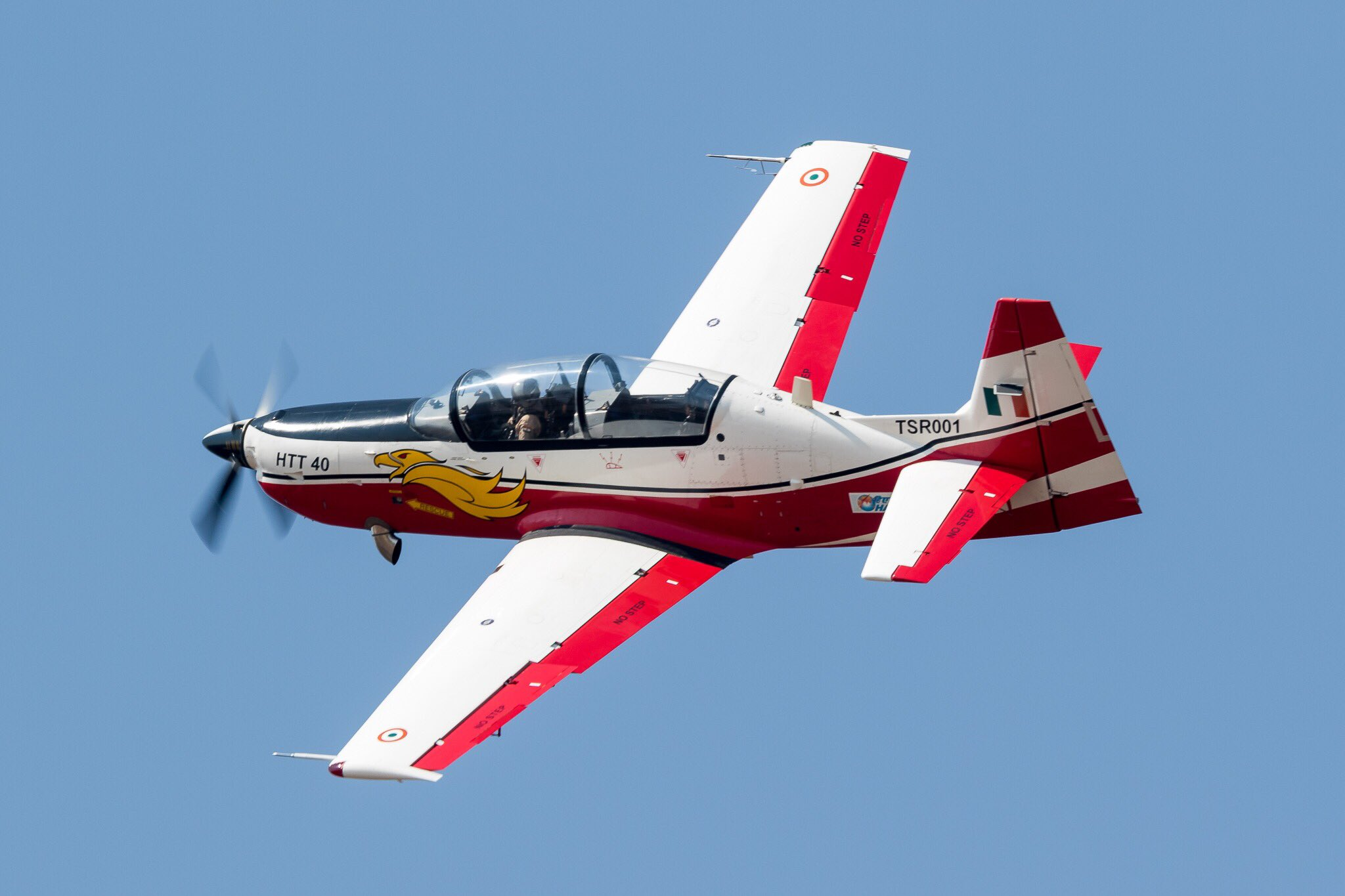

General information
- Type: Basic training aircraft
- National origin: India
- Manufacturer: Hindustan Aeronautics Limited
- Designer: Aircraft Research and Design Centre
- Status: In service
- Primary user: Indian Air Force
- Number built: 3 (excluding 2 prototypes)

History
- Introduction date: 2026
- First flight: 31 May 2016
- Developed from: HPT-32 Deepak

The HAL HTT-40 (Hindustan Turbo Trainer-40) is an Indian training aircraft designed and built by Hindustan Aeronautics Limited (HAL). It will replace the Indian Air Force's retired HPT-32 Deepak as a basic trainer. The aircraft is known as "Ankur" in the Indian Air Force service.

== Design and development ==
The HTT-40 is a tandem seat trainer aircraft powered by a 1,100 hp (820 kW) turboprop engine. In early 2012, the company forecast building 106 examples.

By the middle of 2012 the aircraft's future was in doubt as the Indian Air Force ordered 75 Pilatus PC-7 Mk IIs to fill the role envisioned for the HTT-40. In September 2012, the Air Force indicated that it had formally rejected the HTT-40 for service based on its cost per aircraft being double that of the PC-7 Mk II, which is a proven aircraft and already in service worldwide. An MoD official noted, "We would be willing to pay higher rates to build indigenous capability in strategic defence equipment. But can HAL argue that the capability to build basic trainers is strategically vital[?]"

At that time, HAL did not indicate whether they with continue with the development of the aircraft. A company spokesman said, "We treat all MOD issues/proposals as confidential... All our projects are conceived with national interest in mind though, at times, some of those take time to fructify".

The project formally began in 2013 with an internal funding of ₹350 crore (equivalent to ₹649 crore or US$69 million in 2026) from HAL. It took five years for the prototypes to enter spin testing phase.

Once the HTT-40 started flying, the Indian Air Force Chief publicly stated that IAF will buy the HTT-40 in large numbers.

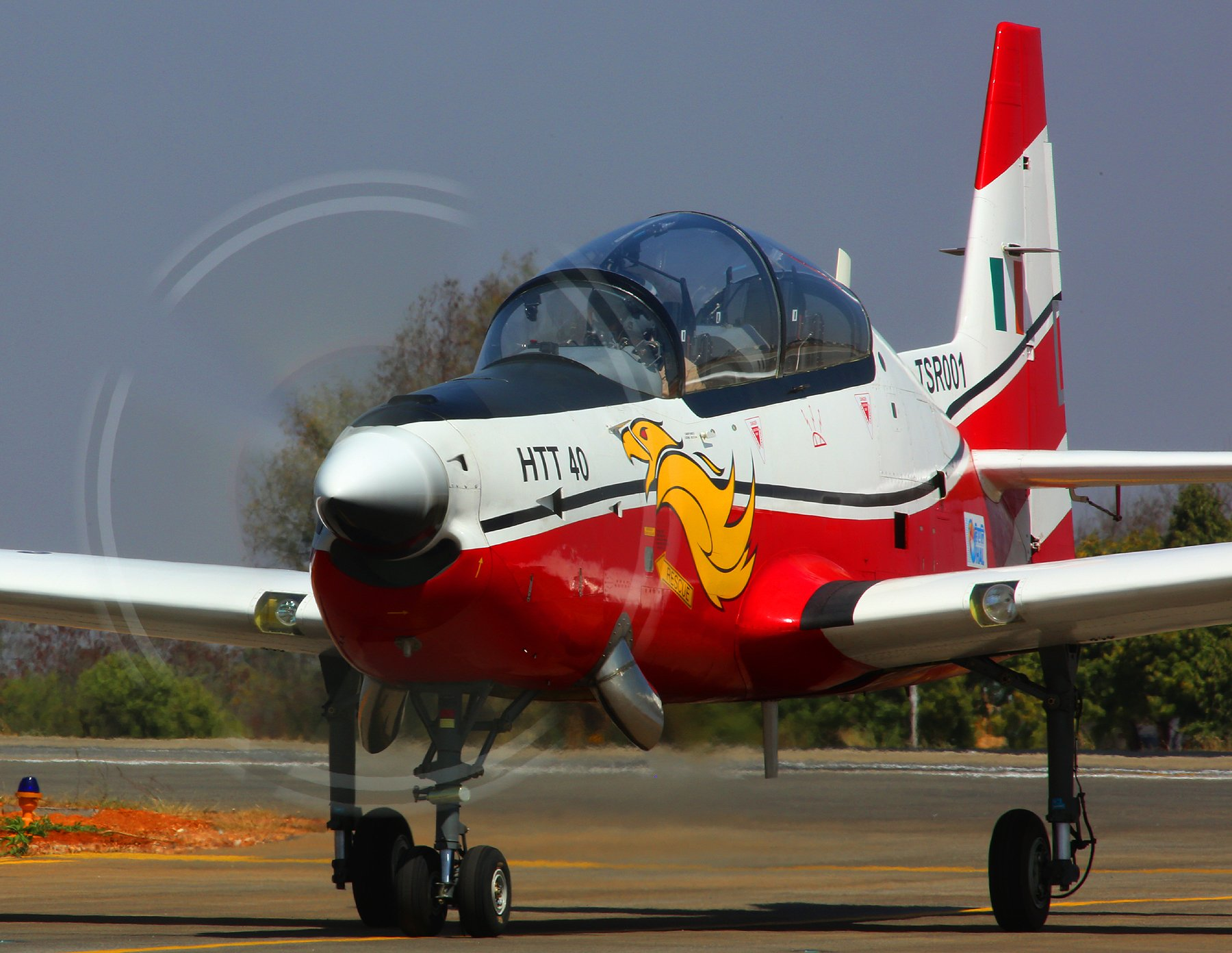
HAL HTT-40 at AeroIndia 2017

On 28 February 2015, it was reported that the MoD had selected 68 HAL HTT-40 trainers and 38 Pilatus trainers to replace its current trainer fleet, stating that this move was "commercially viable".

On 21 June 2015, HAL chose the Honeywell Garrett TPE331-12B turboprop to power the trainer. The deal was signed on 27 July 2022, for 88 engines, kits, maintenance and support worth more than $100 million. Honeywell will work with HAL to extend support for exports.

HAL rolled out the first prototype on 2 February 2016 and it first flew on 31 May 2016.

The HTT-40 made its first public introduction flight on 17 June 2016, with Defence Minister Manohar Parrikar in attendance at the HAL airport in Bangalore. On 19 May 2017, the second prototype had its first flight.

In July 2019 it was anticipated that initial operational clearance would be reached by end of 2019 and that, after placement of an order, the first aircraft would be delivered to the IAF within a year. An HTT-40 prototype demonstrated critical six-turn spin test capability in September and sought final operational clearance. The aircraft also cleared Air Staff Qualitative Requirements (ASQRs). HTT-40 procurement falls under the category of "Indian Designed, Developed and Manufactured" (IDDM), as per Defence Procurement Policy (2016).

By August 2021, the HTT-40 had completed its spin certification flight testing. The platform received its provisional certificate of airworthiness from the Centre for Military Airworthiness and Certification (CEMILAC) on 6 June 2022.

== Production ==
In January 2020, HAL announced that limited series production is to start in year 2020–21. On 11 August 2020, the Defence Acquisition Council approved procuring 106 HTT-40s for the Indian Air Force. At Aero India 2021, HAL received request for proposal from the IAF for 70 HTT40s with an option for 38 more. Production will take place at the Bangalore and Nashik manufacturing plants.

At DefExpo 2022, IAF and HAL concluded ₹6,800 crore (equivalent to ₹79 billion or US$840 million in 2026) crore contract for 70 HTT-40, while another 36 would be procured after operationalization of HTT-40, with a possible follow on of 38 more units. On 28 July 2022, HAL signed a $100 million deal with Honeywell Aerospace for the supply of 88 TPE331-12B engines with support kits for the programme. While 32 would be delivered directly by the firm, the rest would be manufactured by HAL in India under a transfer of technology agreement. A Manufacturing and Repair license agreement was also signed.

On 6 March 2023, an agreement was signed to supply the IAF with HTT-40 aircraft and related equipment. The aircraft delivery will begin in September 2025 and be completed by March 2029. A total of 12 HTT-40 are to be delivered in 2025, including 10 from Nashik and 2 from Bangalore production line. This would be followed by 20 aircraft per year including 15 and 5 aircraft from Nashik and Bangalore production line, respectively.

One of the prototype aircraft participated in the inaugural flypast at the Aero India 2025 event. As of 14 September, HAL was preparing for the maiden flight of a serial production HTT-40 aircraft within two weeks. The flight would be conducted using a Category B engine which was used by one of the prototypes since Honeywell has not commenced engine deliveries due to supply chain issues. The first engine is to be delivered in November, followed by six more engines by end of fiscal year, at a rate of two units per month though HAL has asked them to try and supply more engines. Meanwhile, HAL plans to deliver the first aircraft by January 2026 with another 11 to be delivered by March 2026. The aircraft will have an initial indigenous content of 56% which will be enhanced to over 60% later.

The second production line of HTT-40 along with the third production line of Tejas Mk1A at HAL's Nashik facility was inaugurated by the Defence Minister, Rajnath Singh on 17 October. The preceding production lines of both aircraft is based in Bengaluru. A flying formation of Tejas, Su-30MKI and HTT-40 was exhibited on the occasion.

The maiden flight of the first serial production HTT-40 aircraft wth tail number TH-4001 was successfully conducted on 24 October 2025 from HAL Airport in Bengaluru. The same for the first aircraft from the Nashik production line, also the second serial production aircraft, with tail number TH-4002, was conducted on 5 December 2025.

Although HAL was scheduled to deliver 12 HTT-40 trainer aircraft to the Indian Air Force in FY2025-26, the numbers were revised to three in December 2025. The delivery of the first engine were again shifted to January 2026, followed by another four by March 2026 and subsequent two engines per month. The first three engines were delivered by 27 May 2026. The fourth was delivered by June while another four is expected to be delivered by 2026-end as of 8 October. The final consignments of 16 engines to be directly supplied by Honeywell are expected to reach India by the first half of 2027. Thereafter, the technology transfer will be completed by the 2029 deadline.

The first three aircraft, including two from Bengaluru and one from Nashik, were delivered on 18 September 2026.

== Operators ==
India

- Indian Air Force — 70 on order, 3 delivered by September 2026. Service name: Ankur.

== Specifications (HTT-40) ==
Data from Jane's All the World's Aircraft

General characteristics

- Crew: 2
- Length: 10.5 m (34 ft 5.5 in)
- Wingspan: 11 m (36 ft 1 in)
- Height: 3.4 m (11 ft 1.75 in)
- Gross weight: 2,800 kg (6,173 lb)
- Fuel capacity: 450 kg
- Powerplant: 1 × Honeywell Garrett TPE331-12B turboprop, 834 kW (1,100 shp) derated to 708 kW (950 shp)
- Propellers: 4-bladed

Performance

- Maximum speed: 400 km/h (249 mph, 216 kn)
- Never exceed speed: 450 km/h (279 mph, 243 kn)
- Range: 1,000 km (621 mi, 540 nmi)
- Service ceiling: 6,000 m (19,680 ft)
- g limits: +6/-3

Armament

- Can be armed with a gun, rockets and bombs

== See also ==
Aircraft of comparable role, configuration, and era

- Beechcraft T-6 Texan II
- Embraer EMB 312 Tucano
- Fuji T-7
- Pilatus PC-7
- Pilatus PC-9
- PZL-130 Orlik
- Short Tucano
- TAI Hürkuş
