= DRDO Kapothaka =

Kapothaka

General information
- Type: Experimental reconnaissance unmanned aerial vehicle
- National origin: India
- Designer: Aeronautical Development Establishment

Kapothaka was an Indian experimental unmanned aerial vehicle (UAV) developed by the Aeronautical Development Establishment (ADE) for aerial reconnaissance. Its name, also spelled Kapothaha, means "dove".

== Development ==
The Kapothaka programme began during the 1980s. The aircraft was used to test the feasibility of an indigenous unmanned aerial vehicle system.

== Design ==
Kapothaka was powered by a 26 hp (19 kW) piston engine driving a pusher propeller. It was launched from a rail with rocket assistance.

The aircraft had a wingspan of 4.5 m (14 ft 9 in) and a length of 3.67 m (12.0 ft). Its reported maximum speed was 180 km/h (110 mph), with an operating ceiling of 3,000 m (9,800 ft) and an endurance of 90 minutes. A report published by Rediff.com in 2000 described a planned endurance of 90 minutes with a payload of 20 kg (44 lb).

== See also ==
- DRDO Nishant
- List of unmanned aerial vehicles
