= HAL HT-2 =

Indian two-seat primary trainer

HT-2
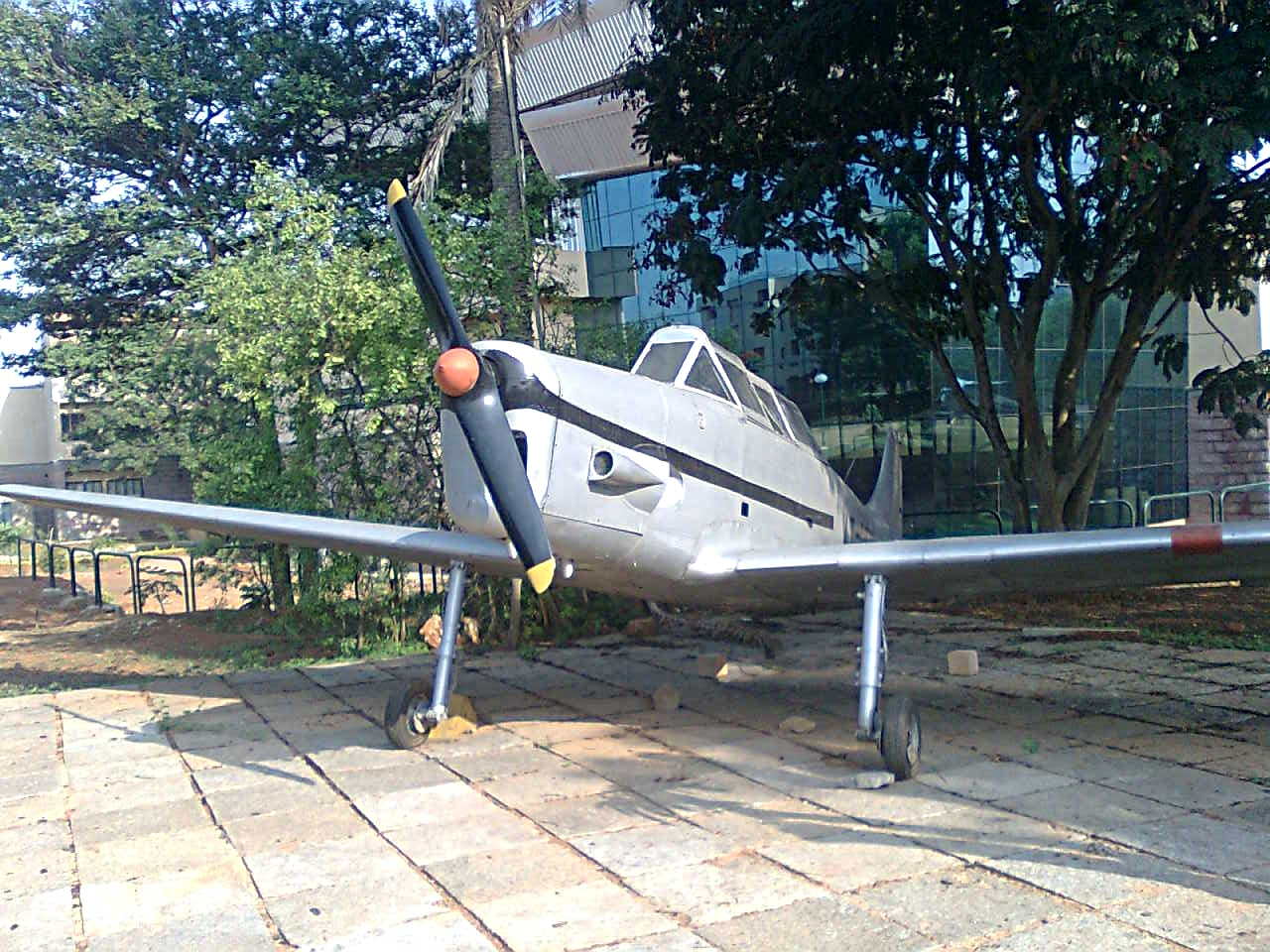

General information
- Type: Primary trainer
- National origin: India
- Manufacturer: Hindustan Aeronautics Limited
- Designer: Aircraft Research & Development Center (HAL)
- Primary users: Indian Air Force: Indian Navy; Ghana Air Force
- Number built: 172

History
- Introduction date: 1953
- First flight: 5 August 1951
- Retired: 1990

The HAL HT-2 is an Indian two-seat primary trainer designed and built by Hindustan Aeronautics Limited (HAL). The HT-2 was the first company design to enter production in 1953 for the Indian Air Force and Navy, where it replaced the de Havilland Tiger Moth. The HT-2 is a low-wing cantilever monoplane with a fixed tailwheel landing gear. Powered by a 155 hp (116 kW) Cirrus Major III piston engine, the aircraft has enclosed tandem cockpits with dual controls. Apart from military use, the aircraft was also used by Indian flying schools.

== Operators ==
=== Military operators ===
Ghana

- Ghana Air Force (retired)

12 HAL HT-2s were delivered and used between 1959 and 1974.
India

- Indian Air Force (retired)
- Indian Navy (retired)

=== Civilian operators ===
India

- Indian Flying schools

== Specifications (HT-2) ==
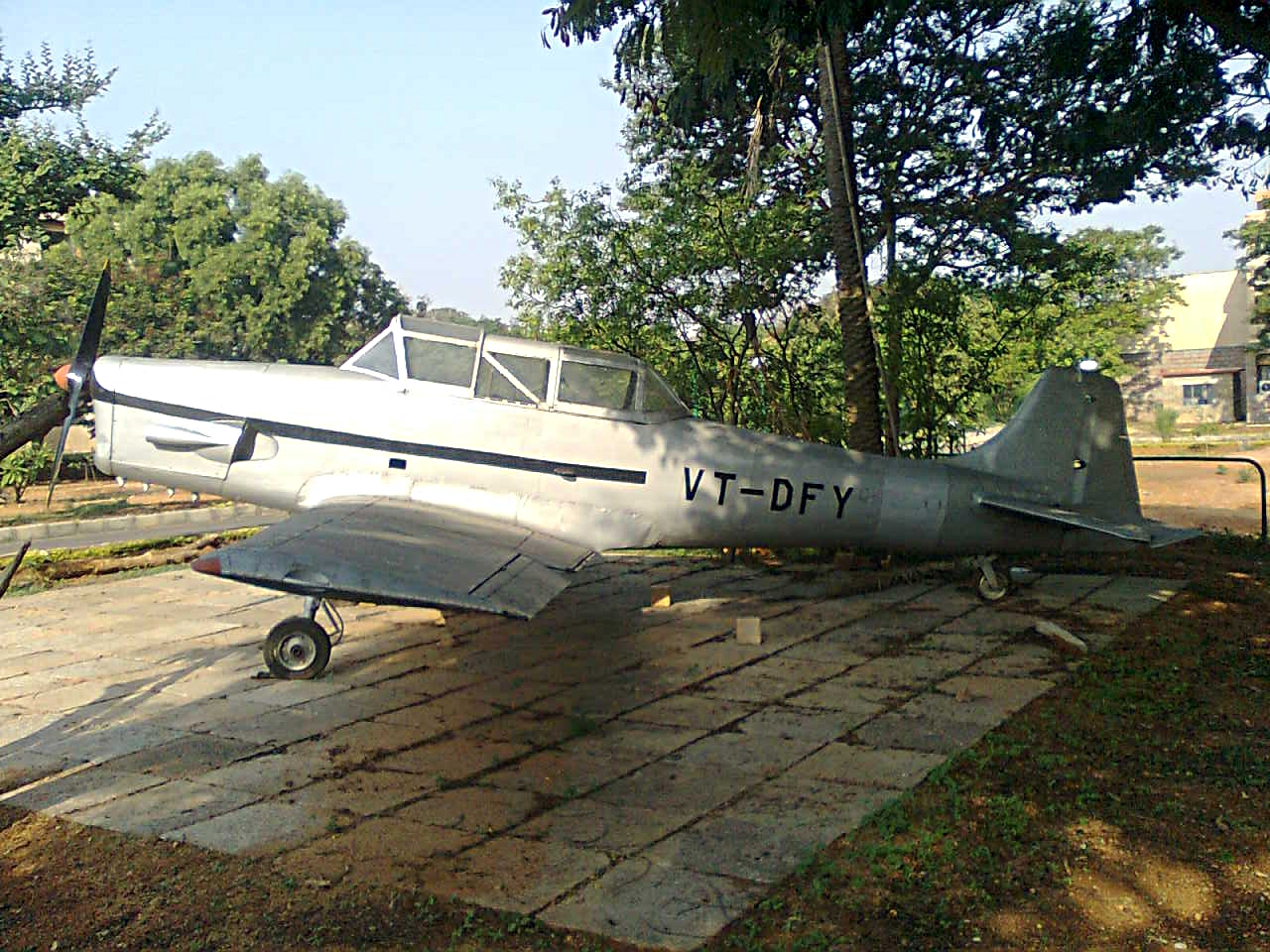
HT-2 trainer at IISc, Bangalore

Data from Jane's All The World's Aircraft 1953–54

General characteristics

- Crew: 2
- Length: 7.53 m (24 ft 8 in)
- Wingspan: 10.72 m (35 ft 2 in)
- Height: 2.74 m (9 ft 0 in)
- Wing area: 16.0 m^{2} (172 sq ft)
- Aspect ratio: 7.13:1
- Airfoil: NACA 23012
- Empty weight: 699 kg (1,540 lb)
- Gross weight: 1,016 kg (2,240 lb)
- Fuel capacity: 117 L (26 imp gal; 31 US gal)
- Powerplant: 1 × Cirrus Major III air-cooled four-cylinder inverted inline engine, 116 kW (155 hp)

Performance

- Maximum speed: 210 km/h (130 mph, 110 kn)
- Cruise speed: 185 km/h (115 mph, 100 kn)
- Stall speed: 84 km/h (52 mph, 45 kn)
- Range: 560 km (350 mi, 300 nmi)
- Endurance: 3 hr 30 min
- Service ceiling: 4,400 m (14,500 ft)
- Rate of climb: 4.1 m/s (800 ft/min)

== See also ==
- List of Indian aircraft

Aircraft of comparable role, configuration, and era

- de Havilland Canada DHC-1 Chipmunk
