= NAL NM5 =

Indian multi-role aircraft project

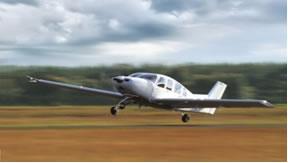
The first flight of C-NM5 on 1 September 2011.

NM5 or C-NM5 is an Indian multi-role, multi-mission aircraft being jointly developed by National Aerospace Laboratories (NAL) and Mahindra Aerospace. It is a 5-seater civil aircraft and an extension of the Hansa project. The NM5 was entirely designed and developed by NAL and Mahindra Aerospace on a 50:50 partnership basis. The NM5 can be used as a trainer, for transporting cargo, medical evacuation, tourism, VIP travel and for training pilots.

== General Aviation aircraft programme ==
This new 4/5 passenger General Aviation aircraft programme was launched as a part of the 10th FYP network programme. Following the successful certification of HANSA-3, NAL proposed the development of a 5-seater general aviation aircraft to be carried out during the 10th Plan. However the proposal was approved only in May 2005 and thus spilled over into the 11th Plan. Work on preliminary design of the aircraft commenced in October 2006.

=== Private Public Partnership ===
This programme is unique in the sense that NAL has started work for creation of an airplane, in equal partnership with a private production agency cum development partner, M/s Mahindra Plexion Technologies Private Ltd., a unit of the reputed Mahindra & Mahindra industrial house. NAL signed an MoU with M/s Mahindra Plexion Pvt Ltd (MP) to jointly develop the 5 seater general aviation aircraft, NM5 and to undertake its production and marketing. It is one of the recent public-private partnership programmes in aircraft design for NAL and in the civil aviation sector in India.

== Public Appearance ==
At the Indian Civil Aviation Airshow (2008) held at Begumpet Airport, Hyderabad between 15–18 October 2008, the 5 seat NM5 aircraft (general aviation aircraft) attracted a lot of interest in business visitors and the general public. The NM5 was exhibited during Aero India for people to see. The NM5 and the Saras models were the biggest attractions in seventh edition in the 160 square metre Indian stall at the Aero India was held from February 11–15, 2009.

== Prototype ==
The engine, propeller and certified seats of the aircraft have been imported also the raw material like aluminium alloy sheets and hardware such as, nuts, bolts, washers and rivets. Prototypes of NM-5 are ready and the certification will take a year. The Directorate General of Civil Aviation is expected to certify the aircraft by December next year. The first prototype of the 5-seater civil aircraft made its maiden flight on 1 September 2011 at GippsAero's flight testing facilities near Melbourne, Australia.

== Price ==
An NM-5 is expected to be priced around $400,000; between Rs 1.2 crore and Rs 1.4 crore. M&M intended to start sale of aircraft by the middle of the year 2010. However, besides the prototype no further planes were made. According to the Australian CASA website, only one NM5 appears to have been registered in 2011, VH XNM. There are no certification details listed for the aircraft. European EASA has no mention of a type certificate for the aircraft...

== Specifications ==
Data from https://www.airport-technology.com/projects/c-nm5-civil-aircraft/

General characteristics

- Crew: one
- Capacity: four passengers
- Length: 28 ft 10 in (8.8 m)
- Wingspan: 35 ft 5 in (10.8 m)
- Height: 10 ft 2 in (3.1 m)
- Wing area: 170 sq ft (16 m^{2})
- Empty weight: 2,083 lb (945 kg)
- Max takeoff weight: 3,362 lb (1,525 kg)
- Powerplant: 1 × Lycoming IO-540 K1A5 naturally aspirated air-cooled flat-six engine, 300 hp (220 kW)
- Propellers: 3-bladed

Performance

- Maximum speed: 184 mph (296 km/h, 160 kn)
- Range: 805 mi (1,296 km, 700 nmi) for 320kg payload
- Service ceiling: 14,852 ft (4,527 m)

== See also ==
- Mahindra Aerospace
- National Aerospace Laboratories
- NAL Hansa
