= DRDO Netra =

Indian, light-weight, autonomous UAV

Netra
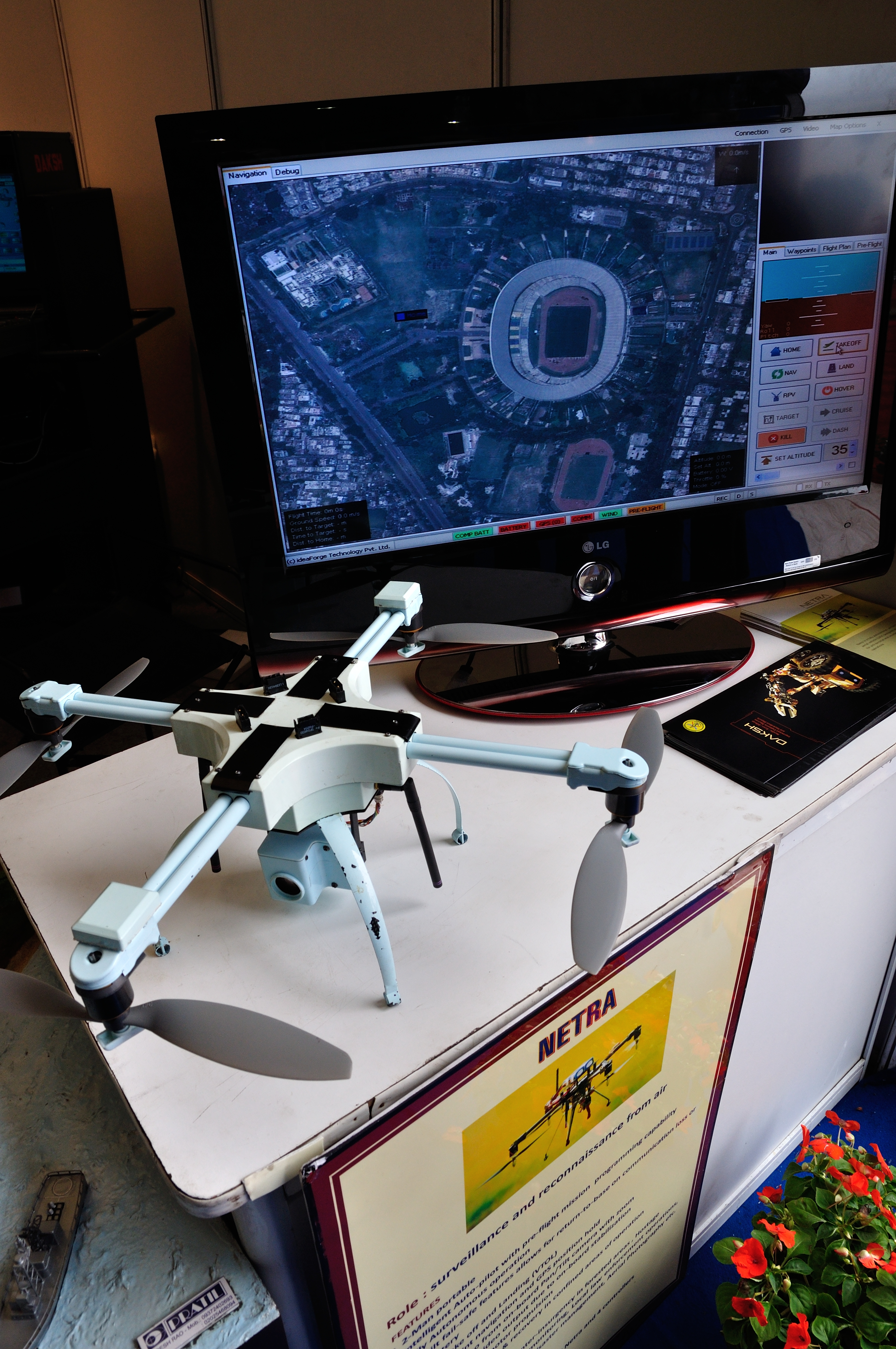
- Netra, at the exhibition of 100th Indian Science Congress in Kolkata.

General information
- Type: Mini-unmanned aerial vehicle (UAV)
- National origin: India
- Manufacturer: IdeaForge
- Designer: Research and Development Establishment
- Status: Active
- Primary users: Central Reserve Police Force Border Security Force
- Number built: 24

History
- Manufactured: 2010–present
- Introduction date: 30 January 2012
- First flight: 3 July 2010

The DRDO Netra (Literally Eyes in Sanskrit) is an Indian, light-weight, autonomous UAV for surveillance and reconnaissance operations. It has been jointly developed by the Research and Development Establishment (R&DE), and IdeaForge, a Mumbai-based private firm.

== Design and development ==
The Netra is a lightweight UAV, manufactured by carbon fiber composites, that uses quadcopters to provide lift and control giving a VTOL capability. It has no moving parts other than the rotors, motors and transmissions, and hence it requires very low maintenance. The use of carbon-fibre has resulted in a light weight of 1.5 kg (3 lb), which makes the Netra very portable. A backpack case allows operators to carry the system to field locations to serve as the base station. It also contains the power supply, military-grade controller, hand-held operator console and the communication systems.

=== Capabilities ===
Netra can be launched from a small clearing, and it can fly up to a distance of 2.5 km from its take-off point. The operational altitude of the UAV is 200 m. With an on-board wireless transmitter, it can carry out surveillance in an area of 1.5 km Line of Sight (LOS) at the height of 300 m, for 30 minutes on a single battery charge. It has a high resolution CCD camera with a pan/tilt and zoom to facilitate wider surveillance and can also carry a thermal camera for night operations. The zoom-in camera can identify human activity up to 500 m away, and can send live video feed of objects within a radius of 5 km. The images are sent through a local wireless network to laptops for monitoring.

Flight and navigation is independent of user-input, and is controlled by an on-board auto-pilot with the help of anti-collision sensors. The user interface offers waypoint navigation, in which the user specifies the location of the target and the UAV automatically flies to that location. A built-in fail-safe allows it to return to base if there is loss of communication with the controller or if the battery is low in power. The UAV cannot yet operate in rain and further research is being done to make it operable in all weather conditions.

=== Trials ===
10 prototypes were made during the development stage by DRDO and they were put under tests like the temperature tests (from -10 °C to 55 °C) and high-altitude tests. After the successful trials, the UAV was cleared for production and induction. The development stage has been completed and Ideaforge is responsible for the production. The company has manufacturing capacity of 10 units per month. The base price of the UAV is ₹15-20 lakh (1.5-2 million), which can increase on purchase of additional components like a thermal camera.

== Operations ==
Netra has done well in the Indian market, with several central and state armed police forces procuring it, and more police units interested in its capability. With the civilian use of UAVs gaining popularity in India, ideaForge has given about 200 demonstrations to prospective buyers. The drone is designed to be used in hostage situations, border infiltration monitoring, law enforcement operations, search and rescue operations, disaster management and aerial photography. It can also be used in naxal-affected districts, in border locations across India for surveillance, and for anti-terrorist and counter-insurgency operations in dense forested areas, where it can use its camera payloads to track human activity. It can also operate in urban quarters, in situations similar to that of the 2008 Mumbai attacks.

It was deployed by the local law enforcement during a political rally in Chandigarh. Gujarat Police purchased two systems at a unit price of ₹55 lakh from IdeaForge. In July 2013 during the 136th Jagannath Rath Yatra, Ahmedabad became the first Indian city to use UAVs for crowd management. Three Netra UAVs were used in Uttarakhand by the NDRF for locating people during the 2013 North India floods. It was Netra's first deployment in a disaster rescue operation. They were used in Badrinath and Kedarnath, where real-time monitoring of their video feed helped locate hundreds of survivors with precision. The Indo-Tibetan Border Police also deployed the UAV on 24 June in remote locations like Kedarnath, Bhairav Chatti and Jungle Chatti to spot survivors.

=== Operators ===
- Defence Research and Development Organisation - 10 units
- Border Security Force (BSF)
- Indo-Tibetan Border Police
- Central Reserve Police Force (CRPF) - 12 units
- Mumbai Police
- Maharashtra Police
- Gujarat Police - 2 units
- NDRF - 1
- Indian Army, Indian Navy and several other state police and central paramilitary forces have shown interest in the UAV.

== Specifications ==
Data from IdeaForge product page

General characteristics

- Length: 0.9 m (2 ft 11 in)
- Wingspan: 0.9 m (2 ft 11 in)
- Empty weight: 1.5 kg (3 lb)
- Fuel capacity: Li-Po batteries
- Powerplant: 4 × electric motors

Performance

- Maximum speed: 30 km/h (19 mph, 16 kn)
- Range: 2.500 km (1.553 mi, 1.350 nmi)
- Endurance: 30 minutes
- Service ceiling: 300 m (980 ft)

Avionics

- High resolution CCD camera or Thermal camera

== See also ==
- Multirotor
- Parrot AR.Drone
