= NAL Hansa =

Indian monoplane

Hansa
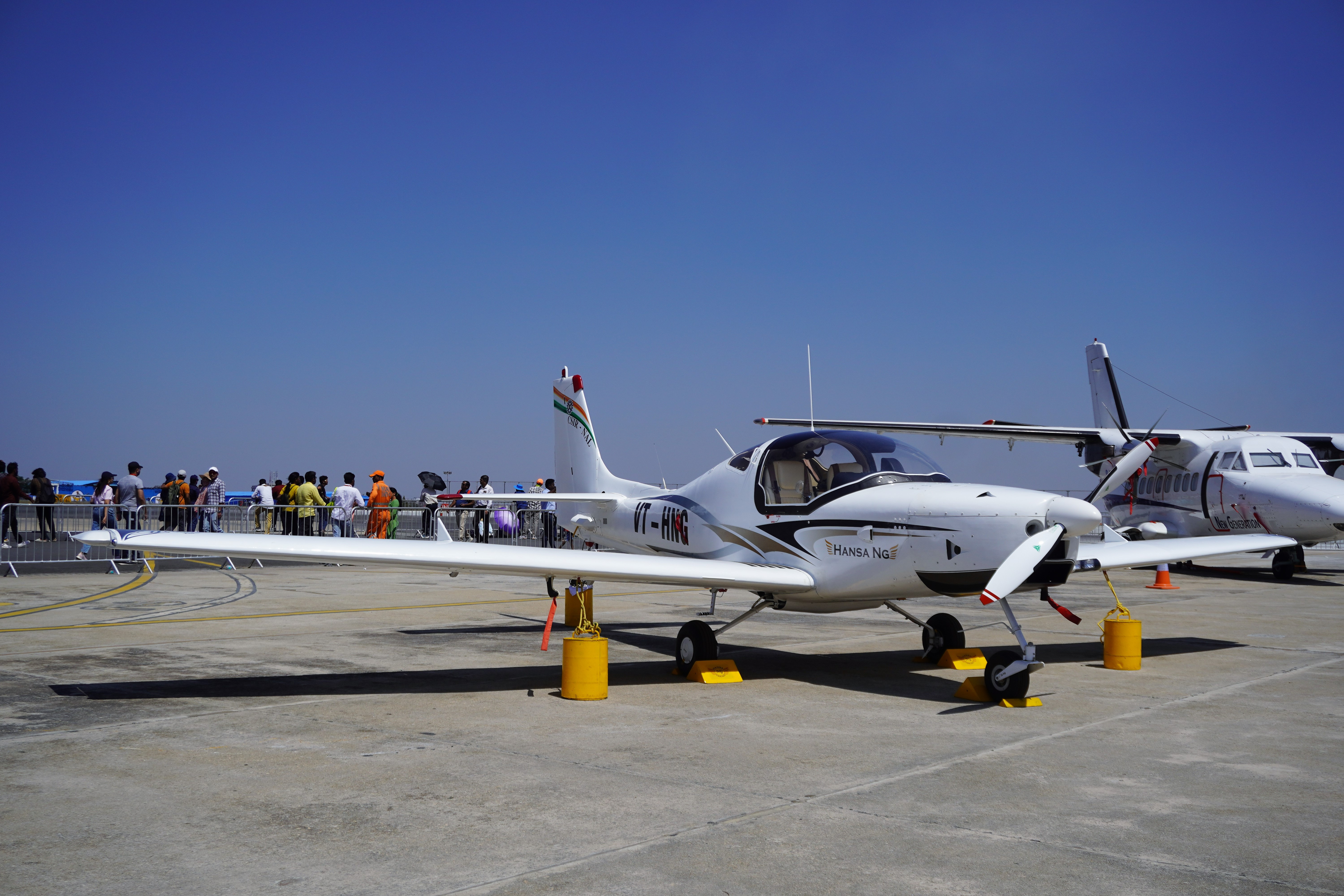

General information
- Type: Light trainer
- National origin: India
- Manufacturer: Taneja Aerospace and Aviation Limited (formerly); National Aerospace Laboratories
- Designer: Council for Scientific and Industrial Research; National Aerospace Laboratories
- Number built: 16 (+1 NG)

History
- Manufactured: 2021-present (Hansa-NG)
- First flight: 23 November 1993 (Hansa); 3 September 2021 (Hansa-NG)

The NAL Hansa (Sanskrit: Swan) is an Indian all-composite low wing tricycle gear two-seater general aviation monoplane. It is the first indigenously produced composite aircraft in India.

Development of the Hansa commenced under a partnership between Taneja Aerospace and Aviation Ltd. (TAAL) and the National Aerospace Laboratories (NAL) in the late 1980s to produce a clean-sheet aircraft suitable for general aviation purposes. On 23 November 1993, the first prototype made its maiden flight. During December 1998, the Hansa received a provisional type certificate from the Directorate General of Civil Aviation (DGCA). By 2004, the type had reportedly flown a cumulative 2,000 flight hours without incident and sixteen production-standard aircraft had been completed. The Hansa has been marketed to various sectors, including flight training, coastal surveillance, and private owner-pilots. Multiple specialised variants, including unmanned models, have also been worked on.

During the late 2010s, it was announced that work was underway to produce an upgraded model of the aircraft, referred to as Hansa-"NG". Enhancements include a glass cockpit, digitally-controlled Rotax 912 ISC engine, electrically operated flaps, and greater endurance. In September 2021, the Hansa-NG performed its first flight; NAL is reportedly evaluating multiple commercial partners to produce the improved aircraft in response to interest from various customers, the majority of which are said to be numerous Indian flying clubs.

== Design and development ==
=== Origins ===
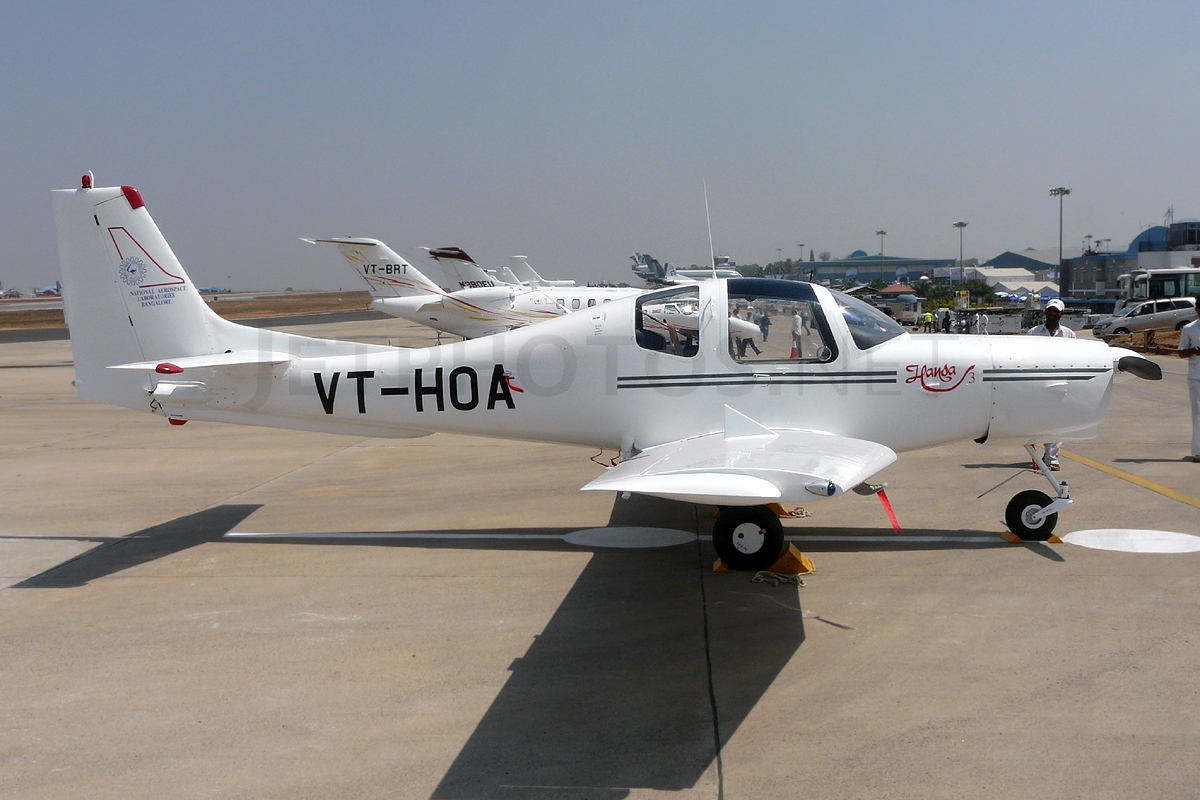
NAL Hansa side view at Yelahanka Air Force Station, Bangalore, India

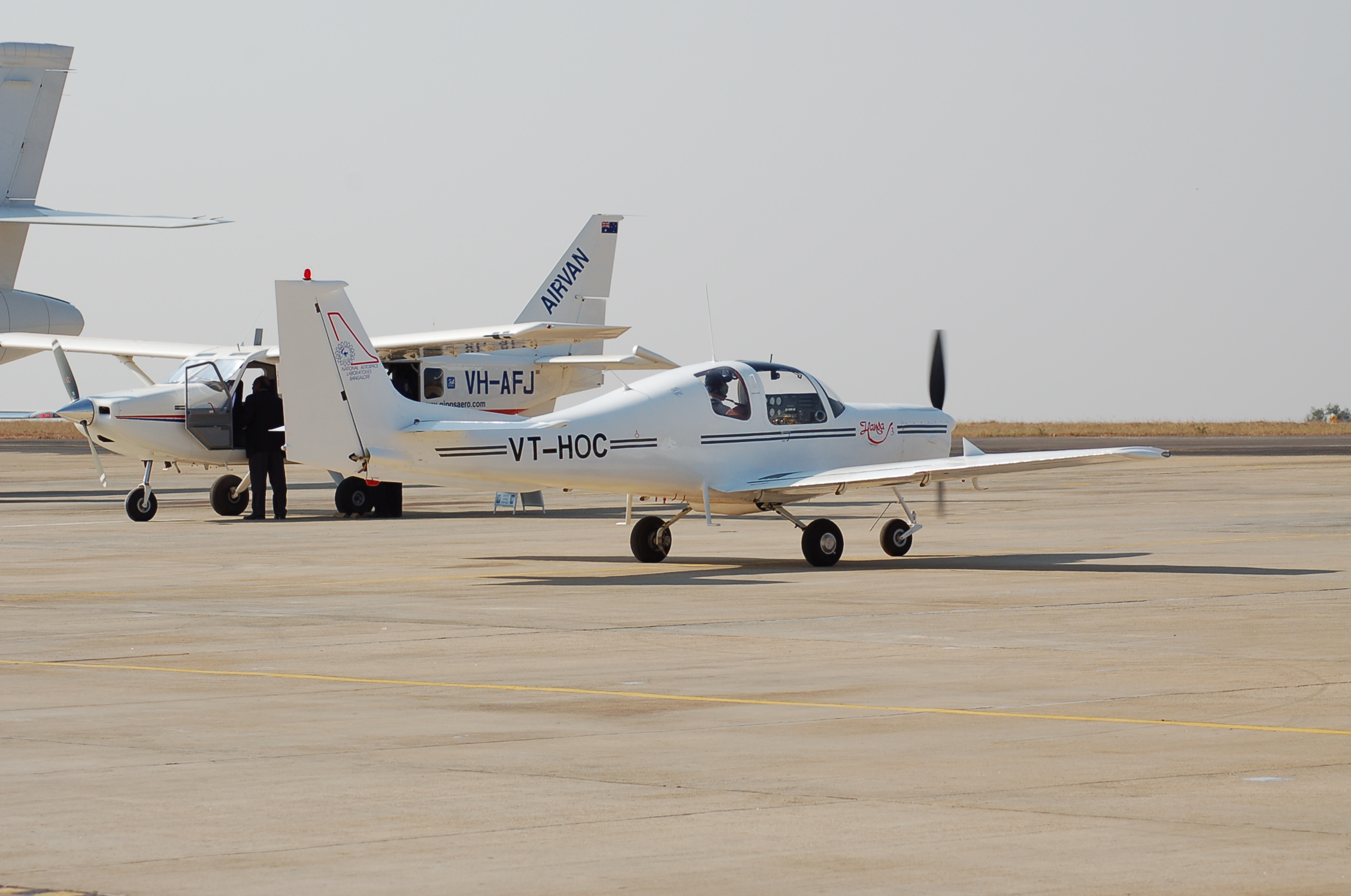
NAL Hansa at 2007 Aero India airshow

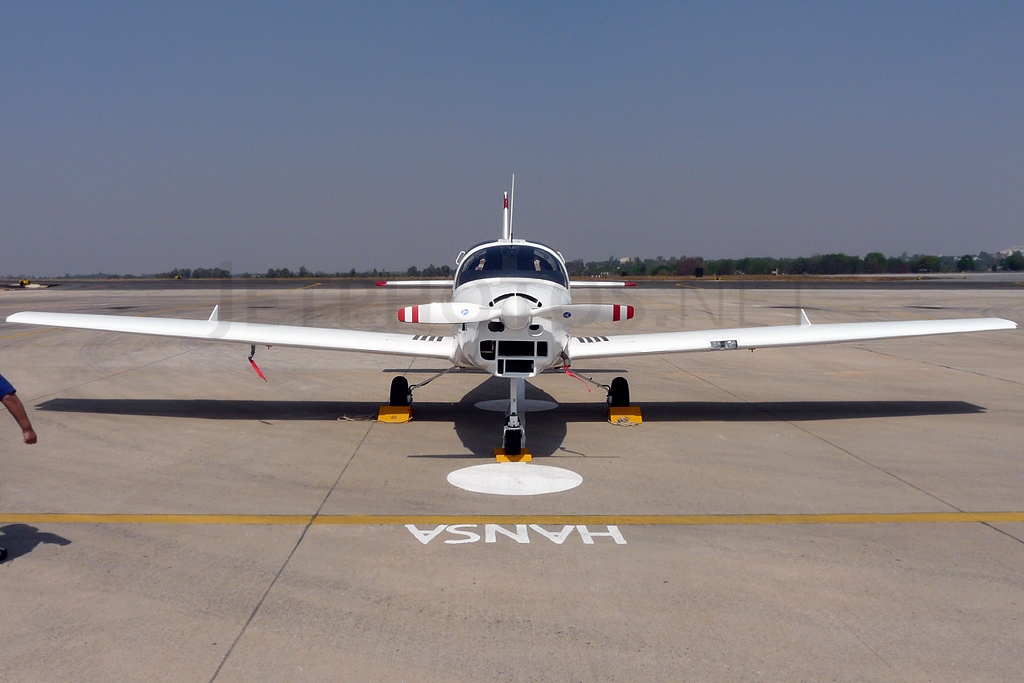
NAL Hansa front view

By the late 1980s, it was recognised that the National Aerospace Laboratories (NAL) of India would benefit from greater experience in designing aircraft. Up to this point, the institution had largely confined its activities to undertaking various research programmes, such as the then-emerging use of composite materials in aerospace applications. However, Indian officials were keen to pursue the design and construction of a completely new aircraft design that would incorporate composite materials, and thus NAL formed a partnership with Taneja Aerospace and Aviation Ltd. (TAAL) to develop what was initially referred to as the NAL-Light Aircraft Project (NALLA). During 1991, work on the programme was authorised to proceed.

A total of three designs for an all-composite twin-seat aircraft were produced; the first of these, referred to as Hansa-1, adopted a pusher configuration, however, wind tunnel testing of a 1:5 scale model revealed severe problems with the design and therefore work on it was discontinued. In its place, the second design, Hansa-2, was selected for to proceed with prototyping. On 23 November 1993, the first prototype performed its maiden flight. On 11 May 1998, a second prototype, based on the Hansa-3 design, joined the flight test programme; it featured various refinements, including the use of a variable-pitch propeller instead of a fixed counterpart, and a more powerful Rotax 914-F3 powerplant. The latter design was found to be superior and thus was selected for production. The programme has been credited with developing NAL's expertise in complex Computational Fluid Dynamics (CFD) for aerodynamic analysis and numerical simulations for aircraft design.

=== Production arrangements and further development ===
Manufacturing and marketing of the Hansa is undertaken by TAAL, activities for the former role being centered at the company's Bangalore facility. NAL is responsible for design and technology aspects of the programme. Prior to quantity production proceeding, a single pre-production aircraft was produced. During December 1998, the Hansa received a provisional type certificate from the Directorate General of Civil Aviation (DGCA). By this point, the Hansa was being promoted as India's first indigenously produced composite aircraft and reportedly cost roughly $90,000 to produce. In February 2000, final type certification was received, clearing the type for both day and nighttime operations.

During March 2018, NAL was authorised by Council of Scientific and Industrial Research (CSIR) to proceed with the development of an upgraded version of the Hansa. It is to be marketed towards cadet training, coastal surveillance, and private fliers. In September 2019, it was reported that the aircraft, referred to as the Hansa-NG, was scheduled to commence sometime between 2022 and 2023.

On 3 September 2021, the prototype Hansa-NG performed its maiden flight. This aircraft featured various improvements and changes, including the addition of a glass cockpit, digitally-controlled Rotax 912 ISC engine, electrically operated flaps, and greater endurance. By August 2023, NAL was reportedly in the process of selecting a new partner with which to produce the Hansa-NG.

On 4 April 2025, NAL and Pioneer Clean AMPS Pvt Ltd on Friday entered into a technology license agreement for the production and after-sales support of Hansa-3 (NG). On 29 November 2025, the production version of the Hansa-3 (NG) aircraft with an all-composite airframe was unveiled. Pioneer Clean AMPS has established a new production facility in Kuppam, Andhra Pradesh worth ₹150 crore (equivalent to ₹155 crore or US$16 million in 2026) with an annual capacity of 100 aircraft.

== Operational history ==
On 14 May 1999, the first production variant of the Hansa conducted its first flight. Across the following four years, the type flew a cumulative 2,000 flight hours without incident, during which numerous satisfactory performance reports were submitted by trainee pilots. By 2004, sixteen production aircraft had reportedly been produced and delivered to various flying clubs while NAL retained three for its own purposes.

By September 2021, NAL had reportedly received 72 letters of intent, mainly from flying clubs, for the improved Hansa-NG.

== Variants ==
- Hansa-2

Prototype as originally flown

- Hansa-2RE

The prototype was re-engined and the span increased, first flown on 26 January 1996.

- Hansa-3

Production version of the 2RE.

- Hansa-S

Originally known as the Hansa-4 it has a more powerful diesel engine (230 hp).

- Hansa UAV

Unmanned trainer aircraft.

- Hansa-NG

Hansa "Next Generation", a more advanced version with better aerodynamics, manufacturing methods, and avionics, in development. It has a glass cockpit, a fuel injected engine and electrically operated flaps. Aircraft powered by Rotax 912iSc Engine with Digital display through CANAerospace protocol. Maiden flight was on 3rd September 2021. Flight Testing is on progress. Also glass cockpit system includes dual Aspen EFD1000pro, GPS integrated NAVCOM system and secondary COM system.

== Specifications (HANSA-3) ==
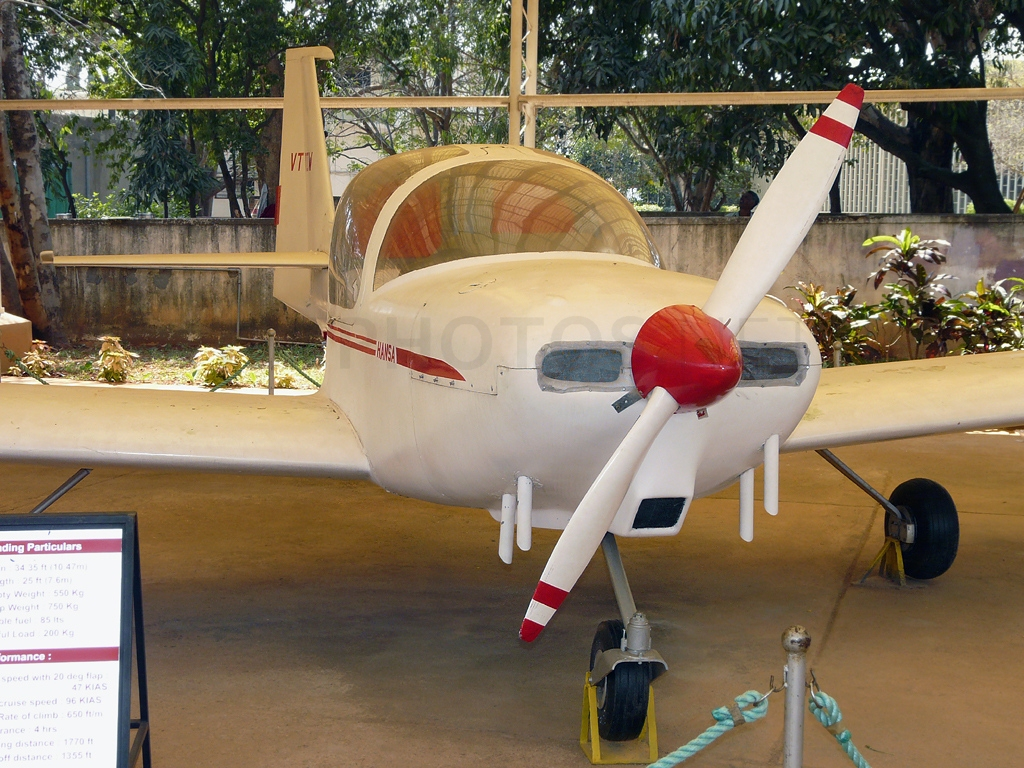
NAL Hansa at HAL museum

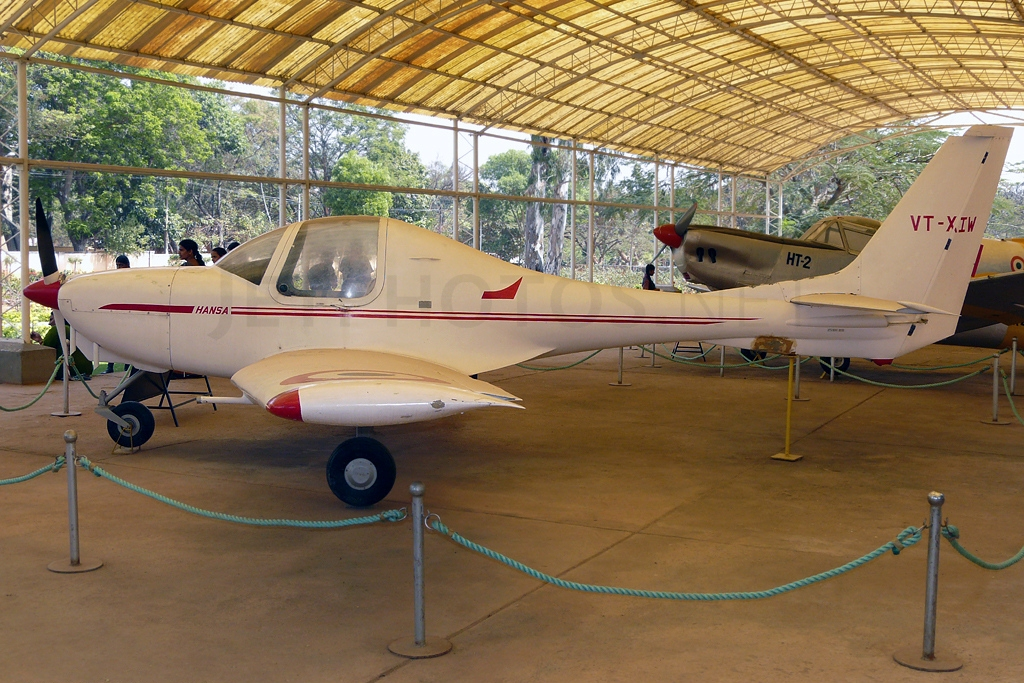
NAL Hansa at HAL museum

Data from Jane's All The World's Aircraft 2003–2004

General characteristics

- Crew: two (pilot and instructor)
- Length: 7.66 m (25 ft 1.5 in)
- Wingspan: 10.47 m (34 ft 4.25 in)
- Height: 2.61 m (8 ft 7 in)
- Wing area: 12.47 m^{2} (134.2 sq ft)
- Aspect ratio: 8.8:1
- Empty weight: 545 kg (1,202 lb) When equipped for night operations
- Gross weight: 750 kg (1,653 lb)
- Powerplant: 1 × Rotax 914 F3 , 85 kW (113 hp)

Performance

- Maximum speed: 231.5 km/h (143.85 mph, 125.00 kn)
- Cruise speed: 213 km/h (132 mph, 115 kn)
- Range: 842 km (523 mi, 454 nmi)
- Endurance: Four hours
- Service ceiling: 3,048 m (10,000 ft)
- Rate of climb: 3.3 m/s (650 ft/min)

== See also ==
Aircraft of comparable role, configuration, and era

- PZL-126 Mrówka
