= National Aerospace Laboratories =

Aerospace research company in India

- Established: 1 June 1959
- Field of research: Aerospace
- Director: Abhay Pashilkar
- Location: Bangalore, India
- Operating agency: CSIR
- Website: nal.res.in

The National Aerospace Laboratories (NAL) is an aerospace research institution in India, established by the Council of Scientific and Industrial Research (CSIR) in Delhi in 1959. NAL collaborates with organizations such as Hindustan Aeronautics Limited (HAL), the Defence Research and Development Organisation (DRDO), and the Indian Space Research Organisation (ISRO). Its research focuses on civilian aircraft development and advanced topics in aerospace and related fields.

Based in Bengaluru, the NAL employs a staff of about 2500 people.

NAL is equipped with the Nilakantan Wind tunnel Centre and a computerized fatigue test facility company. NAL also has facilities for investigating failures and accidents in the aerospace engineering domain.

== History ==
On 1 June 1959, the National Aeronautical Research Laboratory (NARL) was set up in Delhi, with P Nilakantan as its first director. In March 1960, it set up an office in the stables of the Palace of Maharaja of Mysore in the Indian state of Karnataka, on Jayamahal Road, Bangalore, as the National Aeronautical Laboratory (NAL). The first Executive Council was chaired by J. R. D. Tata. Its members included Satish Dhawan and the designer V M Ghatage. Originally started as the National Aeronautical Laboratory, it was renamed National Aerospace Laboratories (NAL) in April 1993. The renaming aimed to reflect its growing involvement in the Indian space program and its multidisciplinary activities.

=== Flosolver ===
Flosolver was a series of Indian supercomputers designed and assembled by the NAL. Work began on the initial computer in 1986 to help with computational fluid dynamics.

== Current Projects ==
=== RTA-70 (Indian Regional Jet) ===
The HAL/NAL Regional Transport Aircraft (RTA) or Indian Regional Jet (IRJ) is a regional airliner being designed by National Aerospace Laboratories (NAL) and to be manufactured by Hindustan Aeronautics Limited (HAL). The aircraft is planned to be a turboprop or a jet with 80–100 passengers capacity. Its basic version will have 70–90 seats (RTA-70)

The 90-seater variant of the aircraft is being designed as of 2021 and is expected to enter service in 2026.

=== High-Altitude Platform (HAP) ===
The National Aerospace Laboratories (NAL) has undertaken the High-Altitude Platform (HAP) project in 2023. The development is parallel with a similar project — CATS Infinity — which is being developed by an Indian private sector firm, NewSpace Research & Technologies (NRT).

In early February 2024, a test flight of a scaled-down prototype was conducted at the Chitradurga Aeronautical Test Range. The UAV remained in air for about eight and a half hours while it achieved an altitude of 3,000 m (9,800 ft). An additional trial was scheduled for the March where an endurance of 24 hours would be tested. During the scheduled 24 hour-long trial, the sequence of power generation along with the recharging of solar cells and batteries in the day and consuming the energy at night could be tested. While NAL will develop the technology and prototype, an industrial production partner would be engaged to commence the actual production of the aircraft.

In May 2024, NAL conducted another flight trial by utilising open-source autopilot system. This trial also lasted 8.5 hours but the UAV achieved an altitude of 7,000 m (23,000 ft). During these trials, Bengaluru-based private space firm, GalaxEye, tested its Synthetic Aperture Radar (SAR) technology on the HAP platform. A memorandum of understanding had been signed between NAL and GalaxEye with the aim of exploring the development, integration, and testing of SAR payloads for HAPS.

Between 8 and 13 May 2025, NAL completed multiple consecutive pre-monsoon flight trials of the HAP prototype at the Chitradurga Aeronautical Test Range. The prototype was equipped with an upgraded, certified autopilot system, known as "sensor redundant control system hardware". The system enables autonomous vehicle operation through custom control laws, navigation algorithms, and automated fail safes for all possible scenarios. NAL expects to have an operational full-scale HAP by the first quarter of 2026.

The existing scaled-down version is one-third the size of the proposed aircraft. The prototype has a length and wingspan of 5 m (16 ft) and 12 m (39 ft), respectively. It has a weight of less than 22 kg (49 lb), carries a 1 kg (2.2 lb) payload and can achieve an altitude ceiling of 7.6 km (25,000 ft). Multiple tests of the scaled-down model will be conducted until 2027. Following these trials, the full-scale model will be developed which will have a wingspan of 30 m (98 ft), altitude ceiling of 23 km (75,000 ft) and an endurance of 90 days.

=== Loitering Munition-UAV ===
This is a long range loitering munition project which is being developed by NAL in collaboration with a private sector firm, Solar Defence and Aerospace Limited (SDAL). Under the project, NAL would transfer technology of its indigenously developed, CEMILAC-certified 30 hp (22 kW) Wankel engine which will be followed by the joint development of the UAV. The 150 kg (330 lb)-class UAV will have a range of over 900 km (560 mi), service ceiling of 16,000 ft (5 km) and an endurance of 9 hours. The aircraft will have a low radar cross section (RCS). The development of 50 hp (37 kW) and 90 hp (67 kW) class engines for heavier UAVs is also underway with the earlier in testing and certification stage.

== Products ==
=== Aircraft ===
- NAL HANSA - Light-weight Trainer Aircraft

The maiden flight of CSIR-NAL's light trainer aircraft, now called Hansa, took place on 17 November 1993. The aircraft is an ab-initio two-seat, all-composite aircraft, certified by the DGCA in the year 2000 under JAR-VLA certification. DGCA has promoted the use of the Hansa-3 by various flying clubs; a total of fourteen aircraft are in operation. Thirteen aircraft are currently operational in India. Ten of these are with various flying clubs, and one is with IIT-Kanpur.

- NAL/HAL SARAS - Multirole light transport aircraft

SARAS had its maiden flight on 29 May 2004. The aircraft took off at 08:15 and flew for about 25 minutes. SARAS is the first civilian aircraft designed and developed in India. Two prototypes have been built and flown (176 flights) by ASTE (IAF) flight crew. The third prototype aircraft (production standard) is under production at CSIR-NAL. Features include composite wing VERITy (Vacuum Enhanced Resin Infusion Technology), empennage, rear pressure bulkhead, front fuselage top skin, and control surfaces. The aircraft will be equipped with an all-glass cockpit, including EICAS and 3-axis autopilot (limited authority). It will be powered by 2x1200 SHP turboprop PT6A-67A engines (Pratt & Whitney) driving 5-blade MT-Propellers. SARAS is capable of flying up to 30,000 ft (cabin altitude 8,000 ft) and is capable of operation from short runways. Certification is in progress by CEMILAC and is to be completed by 2013. SARAS has been designed for many roles, including executive transport, light package carrier, remote sensing, air ambulance, etc.

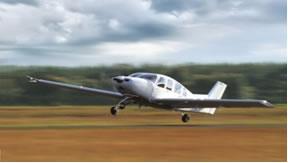
The first flight of C-NM5 on 1 September 2011.

- NAL NM5 - Five Seater - General Aviation Aircraft

C-NM5 is the country's first public-private partnership (PPP) for the development of civil transport aircraft in collaboration with M/s Mahindra Aerospace Pvt Ltd (MAPL). On 1 September 2011, a milestone event for India's first public-private partnership in aircraft development and a bold dream became reality; C-NM5, designed & developed jointly by CSIR-NAL & Mahindra Aerospace, successfully undertook its first flight in Australia. C-NM5 is powered by a 300 HP piston engine driving a 3-blade propeller cruising at a speed of 160 knots with a maximum AUW (All Up Weight) of 1525 kg; a glass cockpit is a customer option. It is an ideal aircraft for air taxis, air ambulances, training, tourism, and cargo.

=== Unmanned aerial vehicles ===
- NAL / ADE Black Kite
- NAL / ADE Golden Hawk
- NAL / ADE Pushpak

=== Gas Turbines ===
The Council for Scientific and Industrial Research (CSIR) has been developing a Small Gas Turbine Engine(SGTE).The organisation is developing a 100 kg thrust class gas turbine engine intended for stand-off weapons, unmanned aerial vehicles (UAVs) and gliders, amongst others.

=== Superalloy ===
GTM-900, an alpha-beta titanium alloy, was developed by Defence Metallurgical Research Laboratory in collaboration with NAL, This collaboration aimed to produce a high-performance titanium alloy suitable for aerospace applications, particularly for gas turbine engines.It is ideal for components like low-pressure compressor blades in aircraft engines.

== See also ==
- Hindustan Aeronautics Limited
- Mahindra Aerospace
- Tata Advanced Systems
