= Aeronautical Development Establishment =

DRDO Laboratory

- Established: 1959
- Field of research: Aeronautics
- Director: Shri Y Dilip
- Location: New Thippasandra, Bangalore–560 075, Bengaluru, Karnataka
- Operating agency: DRDO
- Website: www.drdo.ade.gov.in

Aeronautical Development Establishment is a laboratory of India's Defence Research and Development Organisation (DRDO). Located in Bangalore, its primary function is research and development in the field of military aviation.

Recent successful projects include Lakshya (an aerial target), Nishant (a reconnaissance unmanned aerial vehicle), Ghatak, Nirbhay (a subsonic cruise missile), flight simulators (for LCA, Ajit, Kiran, and Mig-21) and avionics packages for Tejas-LCA (display and FCC). It earlier worked on Sparrow (mini-uav) and Ulka (aerial target).

Shri Y Dilip, Distinguished Scientist is Director of Aeronautical Development Establishment since 1 January 2022.

== History ==
Aeronautical Development Establishment was established in January 1959 at High Grounds, Bangalore. To combine the development and certification of flight systems and avionics, the Flight Control System Integration Complex was set up at ADE. It will provide pilots with simulated training. It serves as a focal location for the development and integration of flight control systems as well as for accelerating the development of avionics and hardware for both manned and unmanned systems. FCS Complex will create and validate flight control systems for Advanced Medium Combat Aircraft and the HAL Tejas Mk2.

ADE Directors
- Dr O.P. Mediratta
- Wg Cdr P Gopalan
- Vivek R. Sinha
- Air Cmde H.N. Krishnamurthy
- AVM H.N. Krishnamurthy
- B.G. Patwardhan
- Dr. Kota Harinarayana
- Dr. K.G. Narayanan
- M.D. Aravamudhan
- G. Elangovan
- P.S. Krishnan
- P. Srikumar
- MVKV Prasad
- Dr Venugopal S

== Technology divisions ==
- Aerodynamics Division
- Aircraft Structures Design Centre
- Propulsion Systems Division
- Flight Control Computer Division
- Flight Simulation Division
- Flight Control Test Systems
- Flight Test Telecommand and Tracking Division
- Flight Mechanics and Control Engineering
- Software Engineering Division - LCA
- Software Engineering Division -UAV
- Mission Sensors Technology Division
- Avionics Systems Division
- Assembly and Integration Centre for UAVs
- Aerial Image Exploitation Laboratory
- Composite Technology Centre
- Quality & Airworthiness
- Combat Aircraft Systems - TEJAS
- Flight Simulation

== Products ==
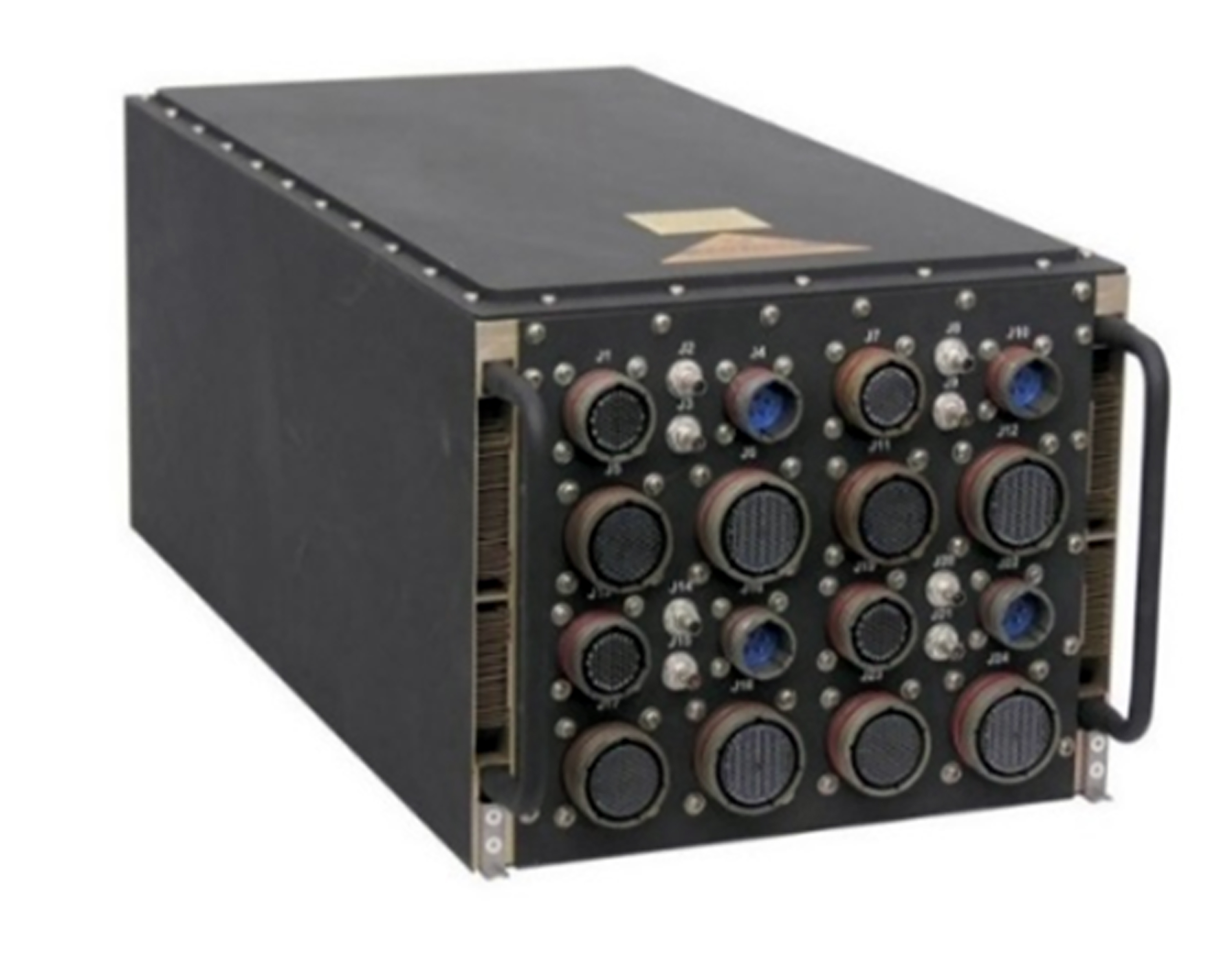
Digital Fly by Wire Flight Control Computer for Tejas MK1A

=== Digital Flight Control Computer ===
The Digital Fly by Wire Flight Control Computer (DFCC) was designed and developed for the Tejas Mark 1A programme. Complying with DO-178C level-A safety criteria for on-board software, it has a quadruple redundant MPC5566 PowerPC-based CPU, a high-speed autonomous state machine-based I/O controller, and increased computational throughput. The first flight of the DFCC, which was installed into Tejas LSP-7 aircraft, took place on February 19, 2024. The performance of the flight controls and all important parameters were deemed adequate. The Tejas Mk1A uses DFCC Mk1A variant for high performance flight control operations.

On 19 February 2024, Tejas Mk1A successfully completed its first flight with DFCC. The existing 32-bit DFCC will be replaced by a new 64-bit DFCC as part of the Super Sukhoi project. For AMCA, ADE is developing a next-generation DFCC with 25 times the processing power of the DFCC Mk1A model. It will feature multi-role capabilities, sophisticated stealth management, and AI-enhanced autonomy.
