= Abhay IFV =

Indian infantry combat vehicle

Abhay
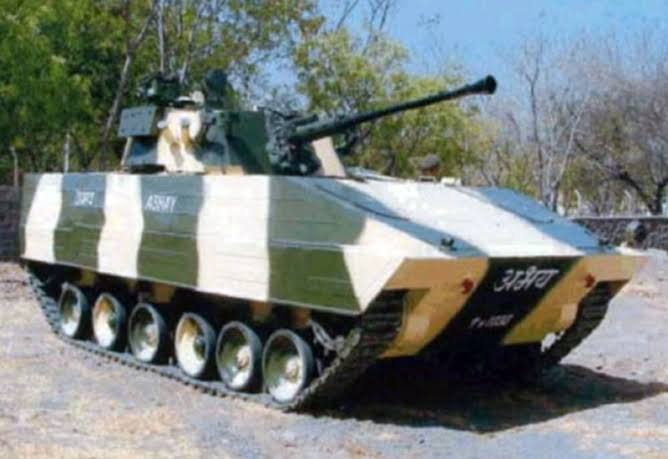
- Mild steel prototype of the Abhay
- Type: Infantry combat vehicle
- Place of origin: India

Production history
- Designer: DRDO
- Designed: ~1997 - 2008
- Manufacturer: DRDO
- No. built: 2

Specifications
- Mass: 23 tons (25 tons with ERA)
- Crew: 3 (commander, driver, gunner); 7 Troops
- Main armament: 40 mm L/70 autocannon (210 rounds)
- Secondary armament: 7.62 mm PKT coaxial machine gun 30 mm AGS-17 automatic grenade launcher
- Engine: Greaves Cotton TD2V8 diesel engine 410 kW (550 hp)
- Power/weight: 24 hp/ton
- Transmission: Full automatic gearbox
- Suspension: Hydropneumatic suspension
- Operational range: 400 km
- Maximum speed: 35 km/h (cross country); 70 km/h (road)

Abhay (Sanskrit: अभय, "Fearless") was an infantry combat vehicle created under a tech-demonstration program started in India by the Defence Research and Development Organisation or DRDO. As its first IFV project, Abhay was designed to provide experience in the construction of AFV components to DRDO, serve as a replacement to India's vast BMP fleet used in its Mechanised Infantry Regiments (changed later on), and serve as a test bed for weapons and systems to be used on future vehicles, as well as to be a reference for the designs of future vehicles.

A majority of the systems on the vehicle were indigenously (locally) developed as projected, excluding 3 out of 4 weapons systems and the power pack.

The program began in the mid-1990s. By 2003, the development of the first Mild Steel prototype was completed and the development of the first armoured prototype was in progress. By 2004, various stages of the vehicle were in the advanced stages of development. By 2005, the first prototype was integrated and tested with indigenous components and the second one was either completed or undergoing testing. By 2008, the Abhay program was officially declared successfully completed by DRDO in the Ministry of Defence Annual Report of 2007–2008.

Allegedly, Mr. M Natarajan, at the time recently appointed Director General of DRDO, stated about the Abhay in 2004: "The Abhay is under development. We see it as the future infantry combat vehicle for the Army. It will be a replacement for the Russian made BMPs that the Army has. It should be ready in two years." This was not clarified later on for unknown reasons and the BMP fleet is yet to be replaced with the FICV program in progress.

== History ==
In 1975, the Indian Government appointed an expert panel to undertake a long-term perspective plan for the army. The committee, also called the Krishna Rao Committee Report, was headed by Lieutenant General (later General) K.V Krishna Rao. It was mandated to present a perspective till the year 2000, and was required to evaluate national security threats, propose a strategy against them, visualise the future battlefield, determine the size of the army and suggest an incremental build-up of forces. 40 Wide-ranging discussions were carried out by the committee with a number of agencies.

A part of the report followed-up on the limited mechanisation of the army that had begun in 1969 with the induction of TOPAS and SKOT armoured personnel carriers. As a result of its recommendations, the Mechanised Infantry Regiment was raised on 2 April 1979, with 14 initial battalions equipped with BMP-1, followed by a further 13 battalions equipped with BMP-2 ICVs by 1990. These changes significantly boosted the offensive/defensive potential of the Indian Army as the regiment provided significant firepower and mobility in any potential conflict. It also kept the doctrine of the armed forces modern, as mechanised infantry were standard practice in other major armed forces by this time.

Technological advancements in the field of armoured vehicles would continue after the collapse of the Soviet Union through DRDO. With the end of the cold war, major changes in the government and liberalization of the Indian economy, India began to focus on self-reliance in all fields. Defence was a major subject to his change, as at the time most of the military equipment in use by the armed forces was imported, resulting in the funding and creation of more arms development programs.

The Abhay was a part of the program to replace aging armoured fighting vehicles with modern ones that fit into the vision of self-reliance. By the mid 1990s, with the invention of modern technologies like thermal sights, digital screens, more effective ERA/NERA etc. the need for a new IFV was apparent and its development feasible. The BMP was no longer competitive as a main-stay IFV for the army as it was designed for a different doctrine that emphasised quantity over quality which meant it was not technologically advanced and thus unable to combat vehicles that were, without the use of the aforementioned doctrine, that India did not follow. This was highlighted in the Gulf War when BMPs under the service of the Iraqi Army were out-ranged, outperformed and destroyed by coalition armored vehicles. Thus the Abhay technology-demonstrator project was started, to locally develop modern technologies that could be incorporated into a replacement for the BMPs that were in service with the Mechanised Infantry Regiment, and to prove that DRDO could complete self-reliance in arms development and procurement.

Development suffered delays from 1998 to 1999 due to the sanctions imposed on India by multiple countries in consequence of Pokhran-II nuclear tests conducted that year. According to Indian Ministry of Defence annual reports released from 2003 to 2008, development of the mild steel hull prototype was completed by 2003, and was being used for testing the automotive systems of the Abhay. The development of the armoured steel prototype was in progress at the same time. By 2004, various stages of the vehicle were in the advanced stages of development, and by 2005 the armoured prototype of the Abhay was complete, using indigenously developed automotive and weapon systems, and armour.

In 2008, DRDO stated about the Abhay:

"The multi-disciplinary, multi-laboratory, Technology Demonstration Programme for development of Infantry Combat Vehicle (ICV) Abhay, has been successfully completed during the year having realized two prototypes. The successful development programme has imparted a boost to the self-reliance in defence technology. The technologies developed under this programme, such as fire control system, composite armour, hydro-pneumatic suspension and host of other automotive and armament sub-systems can be adopted for futuristic ICV and light tracked vehicle projects."

Only two prototypes were made of the Abhay, a mild steel prototype and an armoured prototype.

As of 14 January 2024, DRDO has worked with L&T to develop and test the Zorawar light tank, the first batch of which is to be delivered to the army in April 2024. The tank uses some of the systems developed on the Abhay, such as an Integrated Fire Suppression System or IFSS.

== Design ==
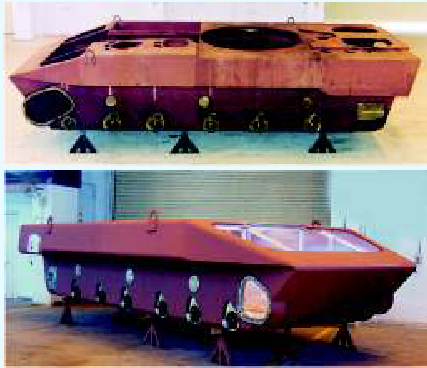
Hulls of both prototypes AP-I and AP-II (top and bottom respectively).

Because the development of the Abhay required several technologies in the fields of materials, electronics, instrumentation, armaments, etc. Multiple DRDO laboratories were involved in the development of this ICV. These were:

- IRDE - Development of instruments (gunner and commander sights, periscopes)
- ARDE - Development of the armament system
- DMRL - Development of composite armour
- HEMRL - Development of ammunition
- CFEES - Development of the IFSS
- DEBEL - Development of the Ergonomic layout
- CVRDE - Consultancy on all aspects of development
- DLJ - Development of electronic protection systems (Laser Warning System)

VRDE carried out the basic design and development of hull and turret envelopes, power pack, running gear, suspension, electronics, automotive systems, system integration, and testing.

=== Hull ===
The hull on both prototypes housed automotive, armament, and running gear systems as well as the turret basket. Out of two prototypes, the first prototype was made from mild steel, whereas the second prototype was made from locally-developed compound steel. The development of the hull helped DRDO in understanding how to create an armoured hull through edge preparation, specialised welding and armour bending techniques. DRDO laboratory Defence Bioengineering and Electromedical Laboratory (DEBEL) based in Bengaluru designed the ergonomical layout of Abhay.

=== Turret ===
The mild steel prototype used a polygonal shaped turret with sloped armor all around to increase protection by decreasing penetration. For the armoured prototype, a rounded turret (more square than round, but is described as round anyways) was made with the same composite armor as the hull again to increase protection by decreasing penetration. The turret accommodated the gunner and commander housing the electronics and mechanics related to both roles i.e primary and secondary armament systems, sights and monitors, fire control system, etc. Both turrets had suspended light-weight turret baskets, and both the commander and gunner had adjustable seats. Bearing meshed with pinion gear helped in turret traverse and was driven by lightweight precision servo gear drives. Stabilization of the turret was provided through a turret lock when required.

==== Instrumentation ====
Multiple instruments were indigenously developed by IRDE for the Abhay, including but not limited to:

- Gunners Main Sight

An integrated, stabilized day sight complemented by a thermal imager and laser range finder with a built-in fire control computer. All the technologies involved and the components used are critical in nature. A modular concept was adapted to realise complete the system.

- Commanders Thermal Monitor

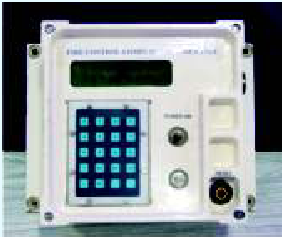
Fire Control System developed for the Abhay IFV. The blue buttons are to input variables such as range, ammunition type, weapon system, etc. There are switches to turn the system on and visible screws on the corners to hold the FCS in.

The thermal monitor, a multi-functional display, facilitates the commander to view targets through thermal imaging as the gunner would. This thermal monitor uses keys to change settings instead of a touch screen common in modern vehicles.

- Commanders Day Periscope

Provides a secondary way of surveillance and target designation to the commander when the commanders hatch is closed.

- Driver's passive night periscope.

Provides night driving capability to the driver when the usage of lights is unavailable. It is based on image intensification technology using a second-generation image intensifier tube, a fast optical system as OG(?), and a binocular eye piece for comfortable vision.

- Fire Control Computer

The Fire Control Computer (FCC) provides ballistic offsets to the gun in azimuth and elevation for different ammunition types based upon the range and environmental conditions. The FCC console enables the gunner to key in ammunition type, range, meteorological parameters, mean point of impact, and bore sighting range, etc. before calculating precise offset.

- Muzzle Bore Sight

Modified from the existing TXP-1-515 sight used for the BMP-2 to accurately perform the same function on the larger 40mm autocannon of the Abhay.

== Protection ==
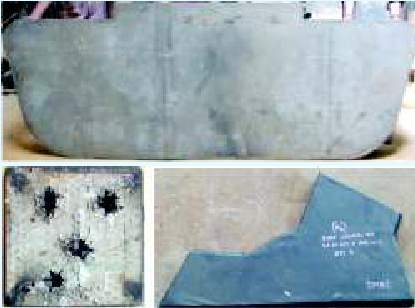
Penetration testing on elements of the composite armor of the Abhay. Ceramic armor (left), anti-fragment armor/spall liners (right), titanium armor (top).

The protection rating of the Abhay was vastly improved as compared to the BMP-2, as its replacement (later on the FICV program) would need much better protection against mines, small arms fire, shell fragments, and other threats it was very likely to face. Therefore, the protection of the Abhay was ensured through multiple layers and systems.

- Armour

The second of two prototypes (the first one was only for testing automotive systems) had all around protection against small arms and frontal protection from medium caliber cannons. It was developed using compound steel, behind which lay a recently indigenously developed composite armor consisting of multi-ceramic armor, high-hardness steel armor, titanium armor, dual hardness spaced armor, and anti-fragment armor at various locations. This led to a weight reduction of more than 40% in comparison with steel for equivalent protection. More than 300 armour components were fabricated to specific shapes, sizes and configurations to be made and tested on the armoured prototypes.

- ERA

A lighter impact version of Explosive Reactive Armor (ERA) with mounting fixtures was developed for the Abhay, which offered protection without any damage to the hull armour of the Abhay.

- NBC Protection System

This NBC (Nuclear, Biological, Chemical) protection system is the same as the modernised one which was tested and developed for the BMP-2. It consists of a Radiation Detection Measurement and Control (RADMAC) Unit, Automatic Control Unit (ACU), Blower Control Unit (BCU) and is automated.

- Integrated Fire Suppression System

An Integrated Fire Suppression System (IFSS) was developed for the Abhay to protect the ICV from fires in the engine and crew compartment. It comprises the Main Control Unit (MCU), IR Detection Units, Automatic Fire Extinguisher (AFE), Portable Fire Extinguisher (PFE), Electrical Pyro Cartridge, Linear Thermal Detection, Alarm Unit (AU), Emergency Switch Unit (ESU), Cable Harness, and IFSS System software.

- Laser Warning System

The Abhay also features a laser warning system which reduces the vehicles vulnerability to laser-guided weapons by providing visual and auditory of any laser guided threats to the crew for the timely initiation of countermeasures.

== Firepower ==
The Abhay is equipped with multiple weapon systems capable of anti-air and anti-tank combat in urban as well as rural engagements, all controlled by the DRDO-developed FCS.

=== Armament ===
Primary armament:

- Bofors 40 mm L/70 autocannon using a 40x365mmR cartridge with 3 standard rate of fire settings, 240 rounds/min, 300 rounds/min, 330 rounds/min. On the Abhay, the Bofors 40mm L/70 autocannon is fed rounds through a dual column feed and ejection system allowing for the gun to be use two types of rounds without the need to change any ammunition belts. It is capable of firing 40 mm APFSDS rounds able to penetrate 100mm RHA at a range of 1000m/1 km for armored targets as well as HE rounds for soft targets and bunkers. The barrel is progressively rifled, indigeniously developed for the first time in the country for a low calibre gun.
- Twin ATGM launcher capable of carrying and firing a BEL modified Milan ATGM with an improved range of 3000m/3 km (possibly up to 4000m). It has space for two missiles placed side by side over two guide rails, which in turn are mounted onto the right side of the turret roof. The launcher system was also tested with the 9M113 Konkurs-M ATGM.

Secondary Armament:

- Automatic Grenade Launcher 17 (Russian Designation AGS-17 "Plamya"), which uses a 30x29 mm cartridge for 30 mm grenades, with a standard rate of fire of 400 rounds/min with an effective firing range of 800 to 1,700 m. The feed system uses a 29 grenade belt.
- 7.62 mm solenoid-fired co-axial PKT machine gun with a standard rate of fire of 100 rounds/min, and a 250-round magazine. The PKT has a higher muzzle velocity and higher cyclic rate of fire then other PK machine gun variants. It can fire 500 rounds in rapid fire scenarios before meltdown.

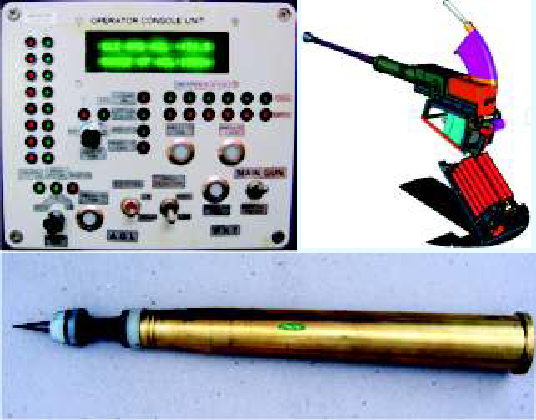
Top left, the Fire Control Unit of the Abhay switched on, with lights to indicate the status of different systems and switches to select weapons and turn it off. Top right, a 3D model of the Bofors L/70 autocannon displaying the dual column feed and ejection system developed by DRDO, with ammunition being fed from the bottom and ejected from the cartridge on the top, upwards. Bottom, an APFSDS shell for the aforementioned autocannon.

=== Fire control system ===
Equipped with an all-electric FCS and stabilisation of the turret developed in association with private sector industry (possibly BEL), the purpose of the all-electric FCS is to position the 40 mm main gun on the ICV on target with the correct azimuth and elevation, and to provide twin-axis stabilisation to the weapon platform against external disturbances.

The whole system is an electromechanical system, using brush-less drives with backlash free elevation and traverse gearboxes coupled to turret ring for rotation in azimuth The system employs vector control technology implemented through digital controllers and insulated gate bipolar transistor based power amplifiers for control of the stabiliser. It uses state-of-the-art fibre optic gyros as feedback elements to receive input on vehicle speed to apply the correct amount of stabilisation. The system has an interface for live connection and interaction with the Fire Control System and Battlefield Management System, using a combined day and night sight integrated with a Laser Range Finder for the purpose of automatically ranging the distance to a target. The whole system has excellent accuracy levels comparable with contemporary systems.

The finished system was tested using both prototypes on cross-country terrain and successfully test fired all armaments on static targets. Being an indigenous development, the FCS can be configured as required to work on similar weapons/allied platforms.

==== Salient features ====
- Provides fire on move capability
- Operates in various modes, viz., self-stab and sight-master mode
- Inbuilt provision for equipment testing
- Interlocks for safe operation
- Dual control through gunner and commander joysticks with override facility to commander

==== Technical specifications ====
- Traverse and elevation rates
- Max.: 40o/s
- Min.: 0.04o/s
- Stabilisation: 0.8 mil/s (1s)
- Acceleration: >50o/s2
- Drift Rate: <0.1mil/s

== Mobility ==
All of the Abhay's automotive systems excluding the Engine are indigenous projects.

=== Engine ===
The engine used to power the Abhay is the Greaves Cotton TD2V8 550 horsepower turbocharged diesel engine with a power-to-weight ratio of 24 horsepower per tonne (24 hp/tonne), able to push the vehicle to an on-road speed of 70 km/h, cross-country speed of 35 km/h, and a cruising range of 400 km.

=== Power pack ===
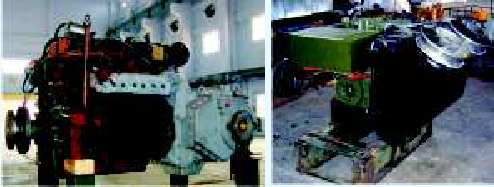
Compact power pack system (left) and air intake and cooling system.

Abhay ran on a 550 hp indigenous turbocharged diesel engine with Hydro Mechanical Power Transmission (HMPT)-500-3EC fully automatic cross-drive transmission of M/s David Brown, UK. It has six forward and two reverse speeds. A new cooling system comprising radiator core, after cooler core, transmission oil cooler, hydraulic oil cooler core, cooling fan, and hydraulic drives was indigenously designed and developed. The compact cooling system with hydraulic drives is capable of withstanding temperatures ranging from -10 degree Celsius to +55 degree Celsius. The steering and brake system integrated with automatic transmission were controlled through indigenously developed actuation system and linkage mechanism. An indigenous Power Distribution System (PDU) distributed power to the compressor, generator, cooling fan, etc. Lightweight final drives offset using aluminium casings were also developed indigenously.

=== Suspension system ===
The hydro strut suspension of Abhay utilised the proven advantages of a pneumatic spring. The hydro damper could be adapted to both tracked prototypes. The damper is inbuilt in this form of suspension. The hydro strut suspension offers better ride comfort and exceptional cross-country mobility. The static load capacity of each suspension is 1.4 ton to 1.9 ton with wheel travel up to 400 mm, and bounce and rebound of 300 mm and 100 mm, respectively.

The technologies used during the development of the hydro gas suspension system include surface finishing and surface coating techniques, sealing materials, manufacturing techniques for seals, test cycles, and testing procedure.

=== Running gear system ===
The indigenously developed running gear system of the Abhay comprises a double pin, and rubber track with a central horn.

The axle arms, sprockets, idler wheels, road wheels, and track tension mechanism have also been indigenously designed and developed.

=== Advance automotive dashboard ===
An indigenous advance automotive dashboard with various sensors was developed and integrated on the vehicle. The dashboard was interfaced with GPS system for navigation. It acquires inputs on various parameters from engine, transmission, and troops' compartments and displays it on the front panel. The front end display shows selectable vehicle parameters such as vehicle speed, engine speed, engine/gearbox oil pressure, temperature, etc. The system checks all vehicle parameters and generates appropriate messages. It also records the cumulative values of important parameters, and schedule of periodic maintenance. The system continuously compares sensors inputs of critical parameters with threshold limits and gives audio/visual warning whenever any parameter goes out of specified range.

== Futuristic infantry combat vehicle (FICV) ==
The Abhay ICV was a technology demonstration programme to replace the Indian Army's aging infantry fighting vehicles. Multiple attempts were followed to replace the BMP-2 fleet with the futuristic infantry combat vehicle (FICV) programme. As of 2021, BMP-2 is the mainstay of the mechanised infantry arm with around 49 battalions including 51 vehicles each.

=== 2007–2012 ===
The initial requirements of a modern but indigenous infantry fighting vehicle was felt in the mid-2000s by the Indian Army.

The FICV programme was launched in 2007 as FICV Project 2017 which planned to start induction of the selected platform after trials by 2017. The project would be undertaken on a private-public partnership model. The cost of the programme was estimated at ₹26,000 crore (equivalent to ₹710 billion or US$7.4 billion in 2026).

In October 2009, the Defence Acquisition Council (DAC), under the Ministry of Defence, approved the acceptance of necessity (AoN) for the FICV project. Then the Expression of Interest was launched in 2010 after formulating the General Staff Qualitative Requirements (GSQR) from the Indian Army. The GSQR mandated the FICV to have a configuration of three crew members and seven soldiers, a ballistic protection from 14.5mm rounds, and must be amphibious and air-transportable. Secondary armaments should include a grenade launcher, co-axial machine gun, and be capable of firing anti-tank missiles. The EoI was sent to Mahindra Defence Systems, Tata Motors, Larsen & Toubro (L&T) and the Ordnance Factory Board (OFB). Meanwhile Russia had offered their BMP-3 for the project.

However, the EoI was cancelled in 2012 even though the selection of a winning private company began as upgradation of existing system was expected to suffice.

=== 2014–2019 ===
Another acceptance of necessity (AoN) was granted for the FICV project which would now include additional private sector companies Pipavav Defence, Tata Motors, Bharat Forge, Rolta, Punj Lloyd and Titagarh Wagons other than the precious companies.

On 16 July 2015, another Expression of Interest from the Government invited 10 companies for FICV development. Responses to the EOI had to be submitted by 17 January 2016. The programme was categorised under Make-I category of Defence Procurement Procedure-2008 (DPP-2008). The companies were allowed to form consortiums to bid for the programme contract. A maximum of five consortiums were allowed, a company could not bid through more than one such consortium. Companies were encouraged to partner with foreign companies "to bring home latest technologies on a licence basis to strengthen indigenous know-how". Two competing consortiums were to be selected as Development Agencies (DA) for prototype development. Further, one design would be chosen for induction in large numbers after extensive field trials of the prototypes. A total of 2,610 vehicles was required.

On 16 January 2016, OFB was nominated by the Ministry while the rest of nine companies would still be competing for the contract. The deadline to submit responses was extended to 15 February for others. Moreover, the expected price to be spent by the nominated companies was increased by ₹800 crore (equivalent to ₹13 billion or US$140 million in 2026) [from the initial approximate of ₹1,000 crore (equivalent to ₹16 billion or US$170 million in 2026)] though 80% of the development was to be paid by the government. The entire decision was to be challenged by the other competitors. Four parameters were placed for evaluation of the proposal: financial, technical capability, criticaltechnology and technical Specification. Clear rejection criteria were also placed based on product competence. Reportedly, there were only few "serious" competitors including L&T, Tatas, Mahindras and OFB.

On 5 February, it was reported that the Ministry of Defence had planned to cancel and reissue the EoI which will incorporate the requirements of the latest DPP-2016 and mandated an increased minimum 40% indigenous content from the earlier 30%. Four assessment categories were identified to choose the development agencies. DRDO was chosen as the "technical evaluation agency" and would not "be competing/participating as a potential partner for any of the 40 key technologies identified by the army in its proposal".

The move was again considered on 28 May as the DPP-2016 was still under formation in February and had then been notified. Reportedly, eight EoIs were formally submitted to the MoD while Rolta and Punj Lloyd opted to stay out of the competition.

However, the process stalled in 2018 as a private company offered the competition to be majorly funded by the industry instead of the government. Six companies had responded to the Army's Expression of Interest.

By 2019, a total of 2,600 vehicles were to be procured at a cost of ₹60,000 crore (equivalent to ₹810 billion or US$8.4 billion in 2026). Induction was planned by 2025. There were multiple delays in the programme as well due to differences between the Army headquarters and the Ministry of Defence (MoD). Also, extensive modification were made to the technical requirements and a new tender was released.

=== 2021–present ===
As a third attempt to acquire infantry fighting vehicles, the Indian Army released a Request for Information for the procurement of 1,750 tracked vehicles for its mechanised infantry arm at an estimated cost of ₹50,000 crore (equivalent to ₹610 billion or US$6.4 billion in 2026), designated as FICV (Tracked) on 23 June 2021. Of the total requirement, 55% would be FICV (Tr) Gun Version, 25% would be FICV(Tr) Command & Surveillance Version and 20% would be FICV (Tr) Command Version. FICV (Tr) was mandated to begin deliveries from the second year of signing the contract at the rate of 75-100 vehicles per year. The vehicle to be offered in the tender was required to navigate plains and desserts along India's Western borders as well as high-altitude mountainous terrains of Northern borders. The selected FICV design would be inducted in three stages, namely, Limited Series Production (10% induction over two years), Product Improvement (40% induction over 6–7 years) and First Upgrade (rest of the vehicles with technical upgrades, besides product improvement aspects).

After studying the response of the industry to the RFI, the Indian Army would forward its technical requirement to the Ministry of Defence for further approval and formal launch of a tender. Then, prototypes will be constructed by selected companies for evaluation. Formal induction of the selected design will take place before 2028-29. Indian manufacturers like Mahindra & Mahindra, Tata, Bharat Forge, Larsen & Toubro as well as foreign companies like Rosoboronexport (Russia), General Dynamics (the USA) and Rheinmetall (Germany) among others were expected to bid for the contract.

While all the variants would be manned by a crew of three, the Gun Version would need to carry eight soldiers and the rest (Command and Command & Surveillance Versions) will have a capacity of four soldiers. Besides traditional armaments, the FICV will also carry mini UAVs and loitering munitions. Further, the loitering munitions were mandated to have a data link range of 10 km with an endurance of an hour with multi-mission capabilities.

On 22 December 2022, the Defence Acquisition Council (DAC), under the Ministry of Defence, approved the acceptance of necessity (AoN) for the FICV project. The Ministry reaffirmed the requirement of a manned or unmanned turret equipped with an autocannon of at least 30 mm calibre as primary armament, a coaxial machine gun (7.62 mm) along with a top-attack anti-tank guided missile (ATGMs) launcher and remote-controlled weapon system (RCWS) with 12.7 mm machine gun. Further, the order was to be split between L1 and L2 bidders (lowest and second lowest commercial bidders, respectively) and commercial bids needed to be submitted before the commencement of prototype trials. Prototype was to be developed within 36 months. Orders will be split between the bidders in 60:40 ratio if L2 bidder meets the price of L1 bidder.

As of 5 July 2024, the Request for Proposal (RfP), the formal tender, for the induction of over 500 ICVs to replace the equipment of 50 mechanised infantry battalions was in advanced stages of formulation. Reportedly, 15 Indian vendors had responded to the earlier RFI and some of their issues were being actively worked out.

== FICV contenders ==
=== Larsen & Toubro ===
As of November 2024, Larsen & Toubro had already developed its FICV platform, based on Abhay IFV, alongside the Zorawar tank and was upgrading the platform to meet the latest requirements of the RFP. The platform was earlier unveiled in DefExpo in October 2022. Earlier in January 2023, Allison Transmission was selected by L&T to provide its 3040 MX propulsion system for the FICV platform also used on Mobile Protected Firepower light tank.

=== Tata and Bharat Forge ===
==== 2014–2019 ====
As of 7 December 2015, the Tata Group was reportedly working to bring eight of its subsidiaries under one consortium to bid for the FICV project. As per a report, Tata Motors will be the lead systems integrator and mobility systems provider, Tata Advanced Systems will work on mission electronics and high technology absorption of electronics, Tata Power SED on systems and weapon integration, Tata Advanced Material Limited on armour manufacturing and integration, TAL Manufacturing Limited on heavy fabrication and hull manufacturing, Titan on precision engineering, and other companies like Tata Technologies and Tata Consultancy Services will bring on board their expertise in engineering and programme management. The Group has also had the experience of developing similar products like Tata Kestrel in collaboration with DRDO.

On 7 March 2016, Tata Motors announced a tripartite agreement with Bharat Forge and General Dynamics Land Systems. Under the agreement, a consortium of the three companies would be formed, led by Tata Motors, for the development of an FICV platform to be delivered to the Indian Army.

==== 2021–present ====
On 28 January 2023, the Defence Research and Development Organisation (DRDO) released a Request for Proposal (RfP) in search of industrial partners for the development of an Advanced Armoured Platform (AAP) with both tracked and wheeled (8×8) variants and a gross vehicle weight of 24 tonnes. Both the variants will be amphibious and equipped with compact integrated power pack with automatic transmission, modular ballistic and blast protection, NBC detection and protection and fitted for but not with advanced laser warning, detection and counter-measure system, add-on armour and interface arrangement for loiter munitions and mini UAV. Other equipment included advanced sensors including thermal and optical sights. A crewless turret with a 30 mm autocannon is also part of the weapons suite. The wheeled variant will have run-flat tires.

On 2 April 2025, a metal cutting ceremony was held at the Pune facility of Tata Advanced Systems (TASL) and Kalyani Strategic Solutions Limited (KSSL) along with DRDO for the Advanced Armoured Platforms (AAP)-Wheeled & Tracked platform. The prototype was rolled out on 25 April 2026.

== See also ==
- List of modern AFVs
- DRDO WhAP – (India)
- Vikram VT21 – (India)

=== Vehicles of comparable role, size and era ===
- K21 – (South Korea)
- BMP-2 – (Soviet Union)
- Mitsubishi Type 89 IFV – (Japan)
- BMP-3 – (Soviet Union, Russia)
- M2 Bradley – (United States)
- ZBD04 – (China)
- Bionix AFV – (Singapore)
