= Snow and Avalanche Study Establishment =

Indian research laboratory

Snow & Avalanche Study Establishment
- Established: 1969
- Director: Sh Ashwagosha Ganju
- Location: Himparisar, Sector 37-A, Chandigarh - 160017, Chandigarh, Manali (Field Lab)
- Operating agency: DRDO
- Website: SASE Home Page

Center for Snow and Avalanche Study Establishment (SASE) is a laboratory of the Defence Research & Development Organization (DRDO). Located near Manali, Himachal Pradesh its primary function is research in the field of snow and avalanches to provide avalanche control measures and forecasting support to Indian Armed Forces. In 2020, Defence Terrain Research Laboratory (DTRL) was merged with Snow and Avalanche Studies Establishment which is renamed into Defence Geoinformatics Research Establishment (DGRE).

== See also ==
- List of DRDO laboratories
- Aeronautical Development Agency
- Bharat Electronics Limited
- Defence Institute of Advanced Technology
- Hindustan Aeronautics Limited
- Ordnance Factories Board
