= Centre for Fire, Explosive and Environment Safety =

Indian defense laboratory

Coordinates: 28.704°N 77.217°E

- Established: 1992
- Location: Brig.S.K. Mazumdar Marg, Lucknow Road, Timarpur, Delhi - 110 054, Delhi, India
- Operating agency: DRDO
- Website: CFEES Home Page

The Centre for Fire, Explosive and Environment Safety (CFEES) is an Indian defence laboratory of the Defence Research and Development Organisation (DRDO). Located in Timarpur, Delhi, its main function is the development of technologies and products in the area of explosive, fire and environmental safety. CFEES is organised under the Armaments Directorate of DRDO. The present director of CFEES is Arvind Kumar

== History ==
The Centre for Explosive and Environment Safety (CEES) was established in 1992 by merging three Defence Research and Development Organisation (DRDO) establishments; DRDO Computer Centre, Delhi, The Directorate of Explosives Safety, DRDO HQ, and the Fire Adviser's Office, DRDO HQ. In 2000 another DRDO lab, "Defence Institute of Fire Research (DIFR)" was merged with CEES. In order to emphasise the importance of fire science, the Government renamed CEES as CFEES in 2003.

== Areas of Work ==
CFEES works in the area of Explosive safety, Fire protection and environmental safety. In addition to developing technologies to protect against these threats, it also trains personnel in these areas, and enforces safety standards in the use of hazardous materials- toxic, explosive and flammable. CFEES also designs and develops sensors to detect these threats.

Explosive Safety - CFEES helps in the Siting of explosive processing and storage dumps and the design, testing and evaluation of safe explosive storage houses. Additionally, it trains armed forces personnel and DRDO scientists in the safe use of explosives and ordnance, and enforces compliance of safety rules. Simulation and risk modeling is also carried out, in order to aid in Disaster Management.

Environment Safety - CFEES develops treatment and disposal techniques for hazardous Heavy Metal Wastes, as well as Photodegradable Polyethylene for use as packaging material at high altitudes, which prevents the pollution in mountainous areas where the Indian Army operates, such as Kargil and Siachen.

CFEES also plays an active role in formulating the phase-out strategy for halon and other ozone layer threatening gases. The National Halon Management Programme, funded under bilateral programme, is implemented by CFEES, supported by Ozone Cell, India. Halons are one of the six categories of chemicals that are covered under the phase-out programme of the Montreal Protocol. The Montreal Protocol, to which India is a signatory, has called upon the parties to phase out the CFCs, halons and other man-made ozone-depleting chemicals. In this regard, the lab is researching into alternative chemicals for fire suppression and other uses.

Fire Safety - CFEES is involved in the development of automatic fire and explosion detection and suppression systems for armoured vehicles, and water mist based fire protection Systems for various applications. It also develops lightweight fire protection clothing. A smoke test tunnel for creating fire signatures under various conditions has been installed.

Specialised Training for armed forces personnel in fire protection, safety, prevention and firefighting is also conducted by CFEES. The lab has also developed a software package for virtual firefighting and fire training simulation.

== Projects and Products ==
Many of the technologies and processes developed by CFEES have more extensive uses in civilian sector. As a result, many of these products have been licensed to Private companies for manufacture, with export potential being considered.

=== Fire Protection ===
==== Fire Detection and Suppression Systems for AFVs ====
CFEES has successfully designed and operationalized Integrated Fire Detection and Suppression Systems for Armoured vehicles like the Arjun MBT, Ajeya and Abhay IFV projects of the Ordnance Factory Board. The system is based on infrared detectors for the detection of fire/explosion in the crew compartment, and is capable of suppressing fuel-fire explosions resulting from an enemy hit or due to any malfunction of the engine, transmission or electrical short circuit. The system is capable of detection and suppression of fires in the crew compartment within 200 milliseconds and in the engine compartment within 15s.

==== Water Mist based Fire Protection ====
Water Mist based Fire Protection Systems have been developed. This includes new nozzles for the generation of water mist, working at low pressure of 12 bars and above to facilitate the proper atomisation of water droplets under high pressure. This systems is used for the following applications:

- IR signature suppression of plume emitted by exhaust of Naval ships
- Air cargo bay
- Electronic cabinet fires
- Fuel –air explosion suppressions

==== Intelligent Fire Sensor ====
CFEES has developed an Intelligent Fire Sensor with software based on a fire signature database that allows its fire detection system to accurately identify true fire situations in a few seconds while rejecting false alarms. The sensor is a highly sensitive detection system coupled with powerful intelligent analysis, which allows fire detection even in dusty environment. The use of laser diode source and multiple reflection increases the sensitivity of smoke detection.

The sensors sense the temperature and smoke, making the fire detector sensitive to both slow-smouldering and fast-burning fires. The system can be installed on board the ships, offshore machinery rooms, aircraft cargo compartments, industries, chemical plants, warehouses, etc. Production of this sensor is being carried out by Southern Electronics Pvt. Ltd., a Bangalore based private manufacturer.

==== Fire extinguishing chemicals ====
A vapour-based fire extinguisher, developed jointly by CFEES and Indian Institute of Chemical Technology, Hyderabad, uses hepta-fluropropane as a replacement to halon-1301, which has been banned by the Montreal Protocol.

A monoammoniumphosphate (MAP)-based multi-purpose, dry chemical ABC powder for extinguishing fires has also been developed. This is environment-friendly as it does not release toxic gases or residue. Production of the same is being carried out by K.V. Fire Chemicals Pvt. Ltd., Mumbai, which plans to introduce it into the civilian market.

=== Environment protection ===
- Technology for the treatment and stabilisation of Heavy metals (Pb, Cr, Hg, Cd, Zn etc.) from effluents being generated by Ordnance Factories and other manufacturing plants. The technology uses a cement/polymer-based solid matrix, and is being license-produced by Quality Water Management Systems Pvt. Ltd., Chennai.
- Technology for removal of nitro bodies (HMX, RDX) from HMX plant effluents (based on neutralisation and alkaline hydrolysis).
- CFEES has also built up expertise in the area of establishing ground water monitoring networks for any project site.
- CFEES has developed processes for producing Coal Pitch based Activated Carbon Spheroids for adsorption of harmful chemical vapours by the protective gears. This is used for protection against nuclear, biological and chemical warfare. The powder has good mechanical strength, low ash content and is eco friendly.
- A National Halon banking and management facility has been set up, where impure halon can be purified to acceptable levels and stored.
