= Vikram VT21 =

Family of Indian armoured fighting vehicles

- Type: Armoured fighting vehicle
- Place of origin: India

Service history
- Used by: Indian Army (intended)

Production history
- Designer: Vehicle Research and Development Establishment
- Designed: 2023–2026
- Manufacturer: Tata Advanced Systems (tracked variant); Bharat Forge (wheeled variant)

Specifications
- Armor: Ceramic-composite armour panels; Modular armour for mine and ballistic protection of up to level IV and V, respectively (STANAG 4569)
- Main armament: 30 mm autocannon turret
- Secondary armament: 7.62 mm PKT machine gun (coaxial); Twin anti-tank guided missile launcher
- Engine: 750 hp (560 kW) diesel engine
- Transmission: Automatic
- Ground clearance: 500 mm

The Vikram VT21, also known as the Advanced Armoured Platform, is a family of eight-wheeled and tracked armoured fighting vehicles co-developed by the Defence Research and Development Organisation (DRDO) along with Bharat Forge Limited (BFL) and Tata Advanced Systems Limited (TASL), respectively. The development was undertaken under the Development cum Production Partner (DcPP) model.

== History ==
=== Background ===
The Indian Army has made several attempts since late 2000s to replace its ageing fleet of licence built Soviet-era BMP-2 Sarath infantry fighting vehicles. The first two attempts initiated in 2007 and 2014 failed to conclude in a contract in 2012 and 2019, respectively.

The third attempt was initiated on 23 June 2021 when the Army released a request for information to procure 1,750 tracked vehicles for its mechanised infantry arm at an estimated cost of ₹50,000 crore (equivalent to ₹610 billion or US$6.4 billion in 2026). The programme was designated as FICV (Tracked). Three variants of the platform will be acquired — FICV (Tr) Gun Version, FICV(Tr) Command & Surveillance Version and FICV (Tr) Command Version — divided with a proportion of 55%, 25% and 20%, respectively.

On 22 December 2022, the Defence Acquisition Council (DAC), under the Ministry of Defence, approved the acceptance of necessity (AoN) for the Futuristic infantry combat vehicle (FICV) project. The Ministry reaffirmed the requirement of a manned or unmanned turret equipped with an autocannon of at least 30 mm calibre as primary armament, a coaxial machine gun (7.62 mm) along with a top-attack anti-tank guided missile (ATGMs) launcher and remote-controlled weapon system (RCWS) with 12.7 mm machine gun. Further, the order was to be split between L1 and L2 bidders (lowest and second lowest commercial bidders, respectively) and commercial bids needed to be submitted before the commencement of prototype trials. Prototype was to be developed within 36 months. Orders will be split between the bidders in 60:40 ratio if L2 bidder meets the price of L1 bidder.

=== Development ===
On 28 January 2023, the Defence Research and Development Organisation (DRDO) released a Request for Proposal (RfP) in search of industrial partners for the development of an Advanced Armoured Platform (AAP) with both tracked and wheeled (8×8) variants and a gross vehicle weight of 24 tonnes. Both the variants will be amphibious and equipped with compact integrated power pack with automatic transmission, modular ballistic and blast protection, NBC detection and protection and fitted for but not with advanced laser warning, detection and counter-measure system, add-on armour and interface arrangement for loiter munitions and mini UAV. Other equipment included advanced sensors including thermal and optical sights. A crewless turret with a 30 mm autocannon is also part of the weapons suite. The wheeled variant will have run-flat tires.

On 2 April 2025, it was announced that the chairman of DRDO and the Secretary of the Department of Defence R&D, Samir V. Kamat, undertook the metal cutting ceremony for the Advanced Armoured Platforms (AAP) — Wheeled & Tracked at the premises of TASL and BFL at their Pune facilities. The roll out of the tracked and eight wheeled prototypes were expected in October 2025. The tracked variant would be fielded for trials by 2026 with mass production expected from 2028. The development is a part of the Futuristic Infantry Combat Vehicle programme. An amphibious variant is also planned.

The prototypes of both tracked and wheeled variants were rolled out on 25 April 2026 at the Vehicles Research & Development Establishment facility at Ahilyanagar in the presence of Samir Kamat.

By late October 2026, the vehicles had reportedly completed their manufacturer testing. The wheeled platform underwent extensive trials and satisfied operational requirements including mobility, trench crossing as well as amphibious capability with the turret. The tracked variant also underwent parallel testing. The Army will conduct further trials in deserts, plains and high-altitude terrains while assessing mobility, weapons systems, firing capabilities and performance under various conditions. The user trials will be followed by feedback for required modifications. The variants are expected to be inducted by 2029, subject to user trials.

== Design ==
The Advanced Armoured Platform was christened Vikram VT21 following the conclusion of its development. They have a current indigenous content of 65% which will later by enhanced to 90%. The vehicles are amphibous capable. The vehicles were also cleared by the Technical Evaluation Committee (TEC) for WH-AFV and FICV of the Ministry of Defence. The variants are expected to serve the roles of infantry combat vehicle and armoured personnel carrier. The base variants can be reconfigured for various roles owing to its open-architecture layout.The development was completed within a period of three years.

=== Armour ===
The DRDO AAP is based on a V-shaped hull to absorb mine and improvised explosive device blasts. It is expected to absorb explosions equivalent to 15 kilotons of TNT. The vehicles are also equipped with modular protection ceramic-composite armour panels to protect troops from armour-piercing ammunition and rockets. The platform has a ground clearance of 500 mm. It provides blast and ballistic protections of to level IV and V standards, respectively, with respect to STANAG 4569.

=== Armament ===
The vehicle is equipped with an indigenously designed and developed 30 mm calibre autocannon-equipped crewless turret, a co-axial 7.62 mm calibre PKT machine gun and a launcher for two anti-tank guided missiles.

=== Powerpack ===
The vehicle will be powered by a 720 hp (540 kW) diesel engine with an automatic transmission.

== See also ==
=== Related Indian armoured vehicle developments ===
- Abhay IFV – Indian infantry combat vehicle
- TATA Kestrel – Family of Indian armoured personnel carriers
- Zorawar – Indian light tank
- Arjun – Indian main battle tank

=== Vehicles of comparable era, role and size ===
- Ajax – (United Kingdom)
- Boxer AFV – (Germany, Netherlands)
- Bumerang IFV – (Russia)
- FNSS Pars – (Turkey)
- Freccia IFV – (Italy)
- Hunter AFV – (Singapore)
- Kurganets-25 – (Russia)
- Lynx – (Germany)
- Namer – (Israel)
- T-15 Armata – (Russia)
- Type 08 – (China)
- Type 96 armored personnel carrier – (Japan)
