= Defence Institute of Physiology and Allied Sciences =

Indian defense laboratory

Coordinates: 28.700356°N 77.217429°E

Defence Institute of Physiology & Allied Sciences
- Established: 20 September 1962
- Director: Shri Devakanta Pahad Singh
- Staff: 70 scientists, 200 support staff, 50 research scholars
- Location: Timarpur, Delhi-110 054, Delhi
- Operating agency: DRDO
- Website: DIPAS Home Page

The Defence Institute of Physiology & Allied Sciences (DIPAS) is an Indian defence laboratory of the Defence Research and Development Organisation (DRDO). Located in Delhi, it conducts physiological and biomedical research to improve human performance in extreme and wartime environments. DIPAS is organized under the Life Sciences Directorate of DRDO.

== History ==
Research in military physiology began in 1950 through a small group of scientists and medical physiologists at Defence Science Laboratory, Delhi. In 1962, a full-fledged laboratory was established with the thrust area of high altitude physiology, nutrition and biochemistry of human in severe stress environment and ergonomic assessment of workstations and man-machine interface.

DIPAS was officially established on 20 September 1962. In 1968, the laboratory was relocated within the premises of Army base Hospital, Delhi Cantonment. In 1993, the lab was shifted to its present permanent premise at Lucknow Road, Timarpur, Delhi.

=== Director ===
Shri Devakanta Pahad Singh assumed the charge of Director DIPAS w.e.f 1 Feb 2025.

== Research Area ==
High & Extreme Altitude Physiology Heat, Cold & Polar Physiology Exercise Physiology Neurophysiology Yoga & Adaptogens for Performance improvement Clinical and cellular Biochemistry Anthropometric Database of Indian Soldiers Nutrition for Armed Forces Man-Machine Interface: Ergonomics Occupation Health & Toxicology Herbal Intervention - Phytochemistry Immunomodulation & Vaccine agents Genomics & Proteomics: Molecular markers Biomedical Engineering & Nanotechnology

== Projects and products ==
High & Extreme Altitude Physiology Heat, Cold & Polar Physiology Exercise Physiology Neurophysiology Yoga & Adaptogens for Performance improvement Clinical and cellular Biochemistry Anthropometric Database of Indian Soldiers Nutrition for Armed Forces Man-Machine Interface: Ergonomics Occupation Health & Toxicology Herbal Intervention - Phytochemistry Immunomodulation & Vaccine agents Genomics & Proteomics: Molecular markers Biomedical Engineering & Nanotechnology. In 2024, DIPAS and the All India Institute of Medical Sciences (AIIMS) began a collaboration for researching and strengthening military physiology.

=== Technologies for civilian use ===
- In 2024, DIPAS transferred the technology for high-altitude sustenance to Power Grid Corporation of India for its 5000 MW HVDC project in Ladakh.
