= Defence Bioengineering and Electromedical Laboratory =

Indian defence laboratory

- Established: April 1982
- Director: Dr R Indu Shekar
- Address: P.O. Box #9326, New Thippasandra, Bangalore-560075
- Location: Bangalore, Karnataka
- Operating agency: Defence Research and Development Organisation
- Website: https://www.drdo.gov.in/labs-and-establishments/defence-bio-engineering-electro-medical-laboratory-debel

The Defence Bioengineering and Electromedical Laboratory is an Indian defence laboratory of the Defence Research and Development Organisation. Located in Bangalore, its main function is the research and development of technologies and products in the areas of life support, medical and physiological protection systems for the Indian Armed Forces. The laboratory is organised under the Life Sciences Directorate of the Defence Research and Development Organisation. Its present director is Dr R Indu Shekar.

== History ==
The Defence Bioengineering and Electromedical Laboratory was formed in April 1976 by bringing together the Aero Electroengineering Unit of Aeronautical Development Establishment and the Electromedical Instrumentation Division of the Electronics and Radar Development Establishment, located nearby. Since 23 June 1992, the facility has been functioning at its own independent premises located at the Aeronautical Development Establishment campus.

It is one of the few Defence Research and Development Organisation laboratories dedicated to research and development work for the services and also spin off use to the civilian population.

== Areas of work ==
=== Products ===
- Indian Army advanced uniforms
- Indian Navy advanced and safe under water suits
- Indian Space Research Organisation suits for Gaganyaan mission

== Projects and products ==
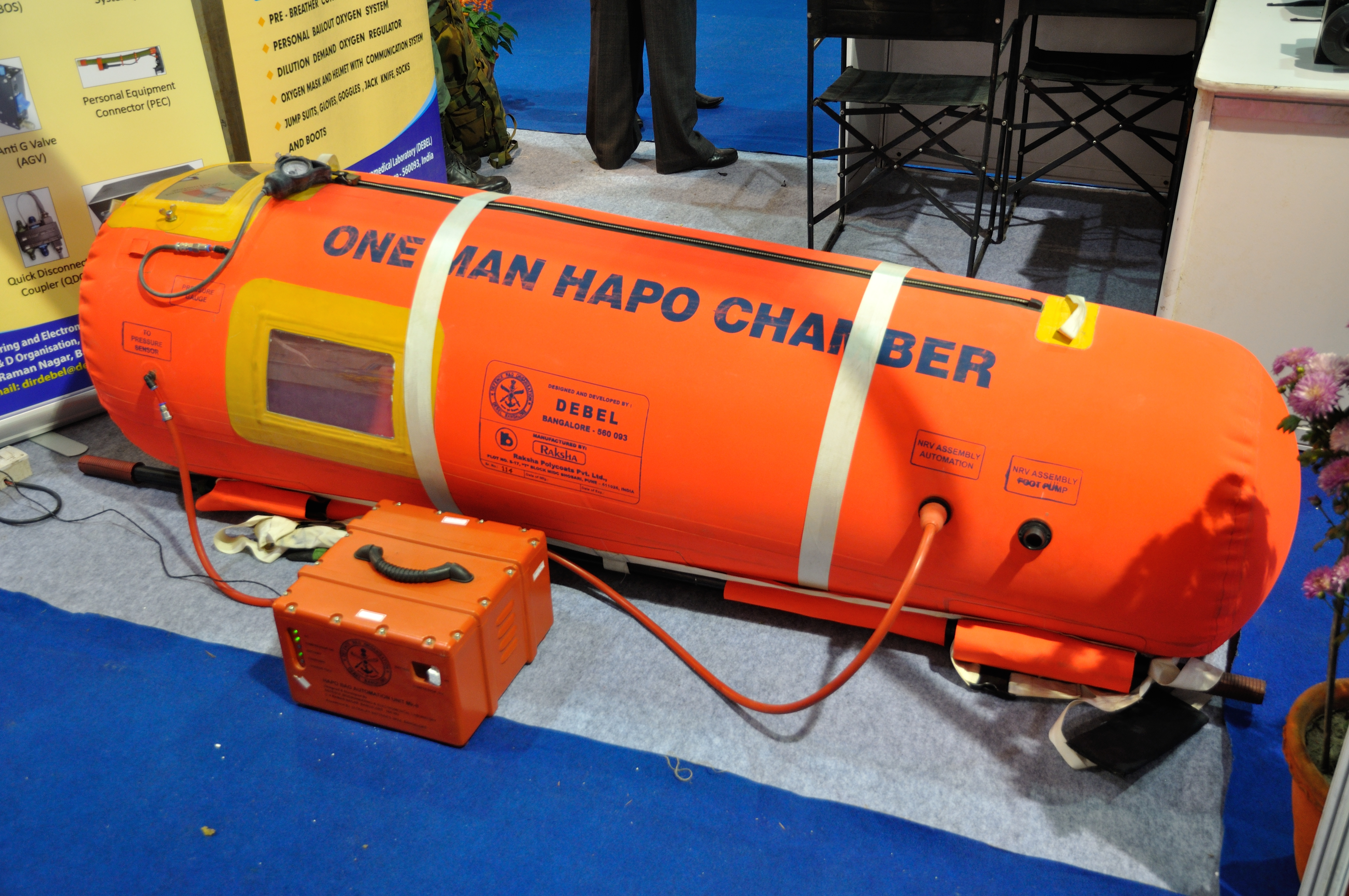
One man HAPO bag.

HAPO Bag for high altitudes with light weight automation unit

Battery heated gloves, insoles, jackets and trousers

Combat paratroopers jump suit

Pilot's dress for LCA

Anti G suit

Smart vest

=== Technologies for civilian use ===
Oxycare system that regulates the oxygen supply by monitoring the blood oxygen level of the patient.
