= Rolta =

Indian multinational technology company

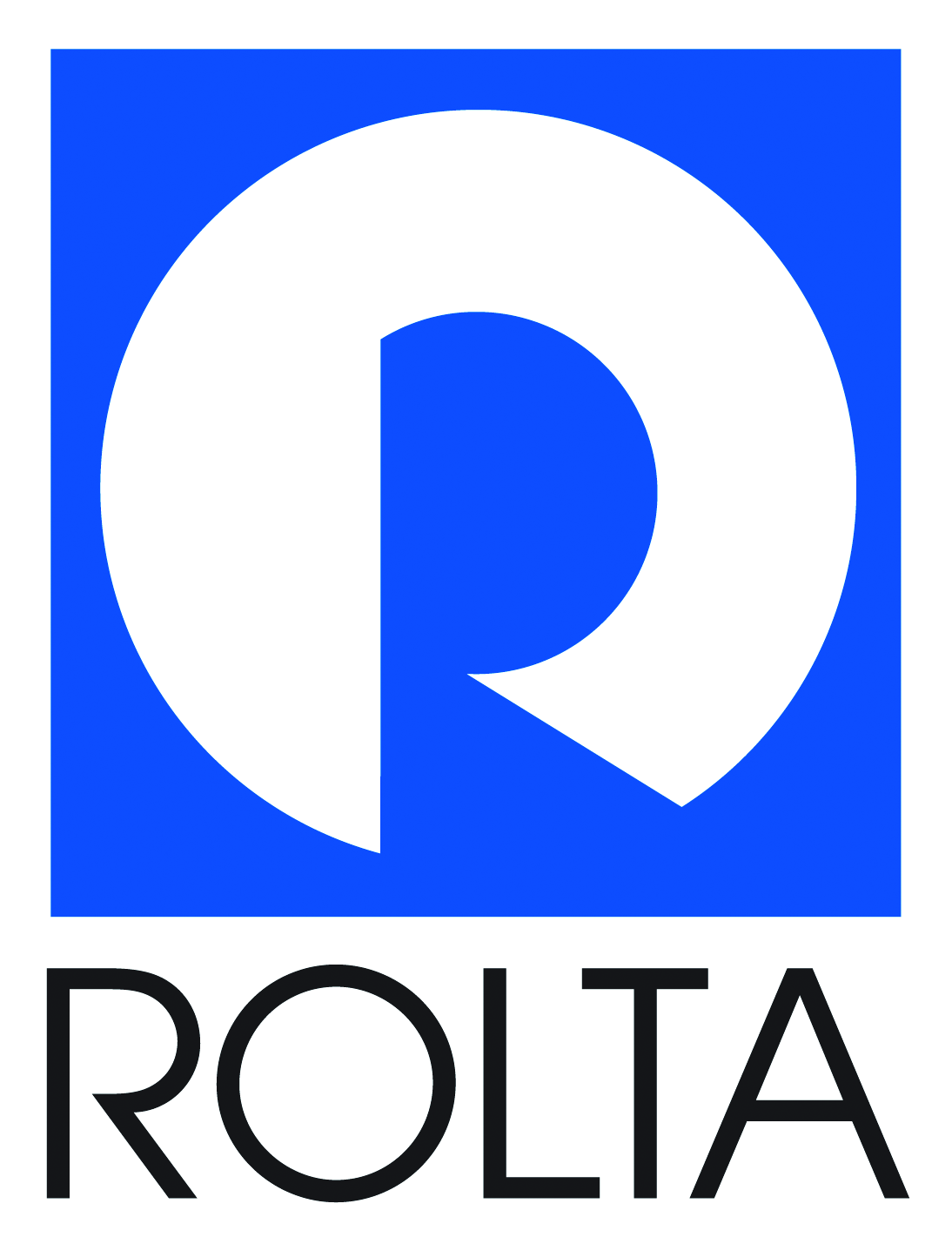
- Type: Public
- Traded as: BSE: 500366; NSE: ROLTA
- ISIN: INE293A01013
- Industry: IT services, IT consulting
- Founded: 29 June 1989; 37 years ago in Mumbai, Maharashtra, India
- Founder: Kamal K. Singh
- Headquarters: Mumbai, India
- Area served: Worldwide
- Key people: Kamal K. Singh (Chairman & MD)
- Products: Rolta OneView; ROLTA iPerspective; Rolta SmartMigrate; ROLTA OnPoint
- Website: www.rolta.com

Rolta, is an Indian multinational technology company, headquartered in Mumbai, India. The company focuses on IT, business intelligence and Big Data Analytics, Geographic data and information and Engineering. The company is listed on the Bombay Stock Exchange and National Stock Exchange of India. The company's Global depository receipt's are listed on the Main Board of the London Stock Exchange. The company's ‘Senior Notes’ are listed on the Singapore Stock Exchange.

== History ==
The company was founded on 29 June 1989 by Kamal K. singh.
