= Instruments Research and Development Establishment =

Indian defense laboratory

Instruments Research & Development Establishment
- Motto: EO Fire Controls & Night Enabling to Indian Army
- Established: February 1960
- Budget: 150 Crores
- Field of research: Optics & Electro-Optics
- Director: Dr. Binay Kumar Das
- Location: Raipur Road, Dehradun-248008, Dehradun, Uttarakhand
- Affiliations: Ministry of Defence
- Operating agency: DRDO
- Website: https://www.drdo.gov.in/labs-and-establishments/instruments-research-development-establishment-irde

The Instruments Research & Development Establishment (IRDE) is a laboratory of the Defence Research & Development Organization (DRDO). Located in Dehradun, its primary function is research and development in the field of optical and electro-optical instrumentation. Their objective is to develop products like night vision devices, electro-optical surveillance and fire control systems.

== Projects ==
=== Holographic sight ===
The IRDE has developed holographic sights which are manufactured by India Optel's Ordnance Factory Dehradun, and have a range of up to 300 m. The Indian Army has already put in a demand for 20,000 holographic device units, while the National Security Guards has shown interest in the device and requested some units in 2008.

=== Laser-guided anti-tank guided missile ===
In 2020, IRDE was among other DRDO laboratories that jointly developed an indigenous laser-guided anti-tank guided missile that can be fired from an Arjun main battle tank.

=== Anti-drone system ===
In 2021, IRDE was among other DRDO laboratories that jointly developed with Bharat Electronics a fully indigenous anti-drone system that has been acquired by all three branches of the Indian Armed Forces.

==== Drone detection and tracking system ====
Due to constant threat of UAV attacks, IRDE is working on a new electro-optical drone detection system. The project is independent of what other DRDO labs are doing in anti-drone warfare domain especially the recently launched D-4 System. The IRDE system will be able to detect 4-foot-long UAV flying at about 300 km/h from a distance of 3 km (1.9 mi) and a drone having a size of about 1 foot and flying at about 70 km/h from a distance of 2 km (1.2 mi). The system will integrate thermographic cameras, high-resolution video cameras, laser illuminators and laser range finders to detect and track rogue drones through electromagnetic and radio emission, reflection of microwave, infrared and visible light.

Since standalone systems and conventional air defense measures are insufficient to engage smaller drones, DRDO is planning to strengthen and build a web of network which will include multiple newly developed systems connected with the national airspace surveillance radars acting in unison for detecting, identifying, tracking and deploying anti-drone countermeasures such as soft or hard kill in case of emergency.

=== Quick Reaction Surface to Air Missile ===
In 2022 IRDE and DRDO laboratories developed the Quick Reaction Surface to Air Missile (QRSAM) system. The QRSAM provides a protective shield to the mobile armoured units of the Indian Army from aerial attacks.
