= Defence Terrain Research Laboratory =

Indian defense laboratory

- Established: 1964
- Director: Dr LK Sinha
- Staff: 70-100
- Location: Delhi
- Operating agency: DRDO
- Website: http://www.drdo.gov.in/drdo/labs/DTRL/English/index.jsp?pg=homebody.jsp&labhits=9516

Defence Terrain Research Laboratory (DTRL) is a laboratory of the Defence Research and Development Organisation (DRDO). Located in Delhi its primary function is research and development of techniques to evaluate terrains and assess mobility potential of inaccessible areas. The Defence Terrain Research Laboratory focuses on providing state-of-the-art terrain intelligence to the armed forces.

== History ==
The DTRL's origin dates back to 1964 when a Terrain Evaluation Cell (TEC) was set up as a unit of the DRDO. The cell's objectives were to develop techniques needed for evaluating terrain and assessing the mobility potential in inaccessible areas. It became a full-fledged laboratory in 1981, and was renamed the Defence Terrain Research Laboratory. DTRL was notified as self accounting unit on 17 September 1988

== Charter of duties ==
- To develop a reliable system for prediction of terrain characteristics and derivation of military potential of various types of terrains based on modern techniques of terrain evaluation.
- To develop infrastructure, competence and instrumentation in the latest techniques related to terrain research.
- To evolve terrain data storage and retrieval system for use by Defence services.
- To interact with the Services & other agencies including Universities for basic and applied aspects of terrain research.
- To develop methods for automatic feature extraction from remotely sensed data.
- To propagate the techniques of terrain evaluation in Defence services and conduct training in this field.
- To become the nodal agency for acquiring and processing of high resolution optical, thermal and hyperspectral imagery.

== Vision ==
To establish itself as a leader in the development of high-resolution terrain intelligence products for defence applications.

== Mission ==
Develop expertise and technologies for terrain database management. Create and update thematic maps and terrain intelligence reports for the users.

== Projects and products ==
DTRL is one of the services organization in DRDO; its primary aim is to provide trafficability maps for the Indian Army. Additionally, it provides consultancy services for landslide hazard zonation. Other specific research activities include subsurface target detection and identification for cross-border sites.
