= Defence Laboratory, Jodhpur =

- Established: 16 May 1959
- Research type: Applied
- Field of research: Materials and electronics
- Director: Shri V S Shenoi
- Location: Jodhpur, Rajasthan, 342011, India; 26°16′18″N 73°2′16″E
- Operating agency: DRDO Ministry of Defence

Defence Laboratory, Jodhpur (DLJ), is a strategically important laboratory of the Defence Research and Development Organisation. It was founded in May 1959 to address issues pertaining to desert warfare. It does studies on radio-wave propagation and physiology. Research is being done on integrated water management, camouflage, electronics and communications, navigation and transportation systems, weaponry, ammunition, storage spaces, and radioisotope applications.

The Defence Laboratory, Jodhpur has developed several nuclear radiation monitoring systems, Chaff technology, and camouflage techniques for the Indian Armed Forces.

== Projects ==
=== Cool vest jacket ===
DLJ created a Cool vest jacket that was tested in Shahgarh Bulge in 2012 together with a cap. Packets of phase-change material are stored in the twelve pockets on the front and back of the Cool jacket. For around 2-4 hours, it helps keep the body cool. They can then be reused after being stored in a deep freezer for recharging. The body temperature can be kept below 30°C wearing the jacket. As the blood flows through the circulatory system, the phase-change material cools the body's soft tissues and captures the excess heat. It works on latent heat absorption and can run for 1,000 recharge cycles. The jacket weighs 1.5–2 kg (3.3–4.4 lb), and costs ₹2,000-4,000. The phase-change material have a shelf life of over six months.

=== Derald Nuclear ===
In the event of a nuclear accident, DLJ's Derald Nuclear sensor can identify radiation levels. It can be installed on a drone to aid in the detection of gamma radiation up to 50 meters in the air. The sensor and its electrical circuit weigh between 20 and 22 grams. The sensor price is about ₹20,000.

=== Chaff ===
==== Chaff Rocket ====
The DRDO lab created the Short Range Chaff Rocket (SRCR), Medium Range Chaff Rocket (MRCR), and Long Range Chaff Rocket (LRCR) in 2021 to satisfy the qualitative chaff requirements of the Indian Navy. All three types were tested by the Indian Navy on Indian Naval ships in the Arabian Sea, and the results were deemed acceptable. The Navy ships fire chaff rockets to confuse the guidance system of incoming radar tracking missiles. The chaff is made up of several tiny fibers coated with zinc or aluminum. To obtain the technology, the Indian Navy partnered with DRDO in 2022.

===== Medium Range-Microwave Obscurant Chaff Rocket =====
The Indian Navy received the MR-MOCR on June 26, 2024. It reduces radar detection by blocking radar signals and forming a microwave shield around platforms. MR-MOCR is made up of a unique kind of fiber filled in a medium-range chaff rocket. The fibers have a diameter of a few microns and have microwave obscuration qualities. When fired, the rocket creates a microwave obscurant cloud that spreads over a large area and has a long enough persistence time to effectively protect against hostile threats that have RF seekers. The MOC cloud blooming and persistence in space were demonstrated in Phase-I trials carried out from Indian naval ships. An aerial target's RCS reduction of up to 90% has been proven in Phase-II trials.

==== Chaff material and chaff cartridge-118/I ====
Together with High Energy Materials Research Laboratory, Defense Laboratory created the advanced chaff material and chaff cartridge-118/I in 2021 to satisfy the Indian Air Force's quality standards. Following the successful completion of user trials, the IAF began the process of introducing this technology. To ensure the safety of the fighter aircraft, very little DRDO-developed chaff material needs to be used in the air as a decoy to divert incoming missiles. In order to meet the IAF's yearly rolling requirement, the technology has been passed to the private sector for large-scale production. To obtain the technology, the IAF partnered with DRDO in 2022.

=== Water Purification ===
==== CBRN Water Purification System ====
For the Indian Armed Forces, DLJ has created a high-altitude deployable CBRN Water Purification System. CBRN WPS Mk-1 and CBRN WPS Mk-2 are the two variants. The Mk-1 is designed for plains and deserts, and it cannot function <1°C. The Mk-2 can work in extremely cold temperatures and is designed for high elevations. The Indian Army has ten CBRN WPS Mk-1 as of 2022. For Mk-2, DLJ has produced two prototypes. One is deployed with XIV Corps. The Mk-2 can function in temperatures between -20°C to 55°C. At Pangong Tso, the CBRN WPS Mk-2 was tested at an elevation of more than 14,800 ft (4.5 km). An order has been placed by the Indian Army and Indian Air Force to purchase 54 Mk-2 systems. The purification capacity of CBRN WPS Mk-2 is between 2,500 and 6,000 liters per hour.

==== Water Radioactivity Contamination Monitoring System (Beta, Gamma) ====
The Defence Laboratory, Jodhpur developed WRCMS (β, γ) for use with CBRN WPS Mk-2 to monitor radioactivity caused by beta and gamma radioisotopes in water. The system was created to gauge the degree of contamination in feed and filtered water in the event of a nuclear or radioactive disaster. A thorough design, production, and validation procedure led to the development of WRCMS (β, γ). It can be used in deserts, plains, and high altitudes, and it can store water at below-freezing temperatures. The system is vehicle-compatible and detachable. It weighs 35 kg when not packaged and 65 kg when packaged. It has a γ-Nal (TI) scintillator for gamma radioisotope identification and a β-plastic scintillator. With audio and video warning adjustment alarms, gross activity calculation, and contamination report creation, the minimal detectable activity is less than 100 Bq/L. The system is MIL-STD-461E compliant, and can work in 50-550°C (± 30°C). It includes a control and display unit, and is EMI/EMC compatible. It follows JSS 55555 guidelines.

=== Radar Absorbing Paint ===
The Defence Laboratory created Polyurethane based Radar Absorbing Paint (RAP) in 2023 to help military aircraft become more stealthy against hostile radars by lowering their radar signature. The results of using the RAP on IAF platforms, such as the Mikoyan MiG-29 fighter jets, were positive. It is designed to be applied to strategic targets for radar cross section reduction utilizing magnetic functional filler material. RAP's polyurethane resin structure offers exceptional resilience to weathering and can survive extremely high and low temperatures. To achieve the best radar absorption capabilities, a magnetic functional filler material of a certain size and shape has been added to the resin matrix in the suitable ratio. The proposed paint can be applied to both land-based and airborne strategic targets. Carbon nanotubes and other materials are used in RAP to produce a coating that has a broad frequency range of electromagnetic wave absorption.

More than 90% microwave absorption, room temperature drying and curing for field use, thermal stability at both high and low temperatures, and resistance to hydraulic oil, water, and air turbine fuel are all demonstrated by the RAP. It can be applied to Al/Al alloy and carbon-fiber reinforced polymer composite surfaces without compromising their structural qualities, and it can survive thermal shock cycling and aerodynamic vibration. It will be used in HAL Tejas Mk2.

=== Lightweight High Strength Flexible Radar Absorbing Rubber Sheet (LHSF-RAbS) ===
To lessen radar reflection, DLJ has created rubber sheets that absorb radio waves. The rubber sheet is lightweight, flexible, strong, and has a wide range of temperature stability. To achieve the best absorption characteristics at microwave frequencies, the rubber matrix has been filled with functional dielectric filler in the suitable ratio. It has almost 90% microwave absorption capacity. LHSF-RAbS is flexible and simple to apply on curved surfaces, and it takes less time to cover a large area. It is resistant to water and hydraulic oil, can be custom-molded to any shape, and can be adhered to Al/Al alloy, composite surfaces, using rubber-based adhesive. LHSF-RAbS can be used outside on targets that are at sea, on land, and in the air.

=== Inflatable Aircraft Decoy (InfADec) ===
Defense Laboratory has created an inflatable aircraft decoy of the air retainable kind, which lessens the need for constant air blower operation. Compared to rubber-coated fabric-based decoys, the InfADec is made of plastic-coated fabric is lighter and easier for two to three people to manage. For the inflatable decoy to run continuously for several days, an automated air pressure control system was also created. InfADec creates air-retainable lightweight fabric patterns using specially engineered coated fabric structures with low air permeability. To make handling and deployment easier, modular architecture was used. Additionally, the inflatable modules were made using suitable fabric sealing technology. To achieve the necessary size and shape, the necessary cross-sectional members were supplied. The deployment area was equipped with a movable iron support structure. It takes 10 to 12 minutes to inflate or deflate, and it may hold its shape for up to 8 hours without the need for additional air.

=== Radiation monitoring ===
The Indian Navy received the Gamma Radiation Aerial Surveillance System (GRASS), Environmental Surveillance Vehicle (ESV), Vehicle Radiological Contamination Monitoring System (VRCMS), Underwater Gamma Radiation Monitoring System (UGRMS), Dirt Extractor and Cross Contamination Monitor (DECCOM), and Organ Radioactivity Detection System (ORDS) on 15 July 2025. GRASS uses a lightweight gamma radiation detecting module that can be integrated with UAVs to provide aerial radiological surveillance of nuclear-contaminated areas. ESV is developed in partnership with Vehicles Research and Development Establishment and is intended to quickly identify, detect, and track nuclear, biological and chemical contamination. Underwater gamma radiation levels are measured by UGRMS, which then sends the results to a base station. It is used for monitoring in ports and coastal areas, nuclear catastrophe management, radiological emergency response, and safety assurance in the vicinity of nuclear facilities or during naval operations. DECCOM is intended for usage in environments contaminated with NBC. It reduces the possibility of hazardous materials being transferred across zones while aiding in the extraction and analysis of NBC contaminant from shoes. In situations involving nuclear or radioactive exposure, ORDS is used to detect and track radioactivity levels in human organs.

== Industry collaboration ==
Defence Laboratory supported Economic Explosives Limited in setting up an advanced technology plant that would reduce reliance on imports while producing 118 mm, 50 mm, and 26 mm Chaff payloads for Dassault Mirage 2000, Mikoyan MiG-29, SEPECAT Jaguar, and all helicopters in use by the armed forces. On 4 August 2024, Air Marshal Ashutosh Dixit, Deputy Chief of Air Staff, officially opened the manufacturing plant.

== Technology transfers ==
In 2024, DRDO transferred the technology for the Microwave Obscurant Chaff (MOC), which was developed by Defence Laboratory, to the Indian Navy. The MOC conceals radar signals and generates a microwave shield around platforms and assets, which reduces detection by radars.
