= Project Indigo =

Indian–Swiss surface-to-air missile project

Project Indigo was started by India in 1962. An agreement was signed between India and Switzerland to develop an intermediate-range surface-to-air missile (SAM). Indigo was discontinued in later years without achieving full success. Project Indigo led to Project Devil, to develop short-range surface-to-air missile in the 1970s. Project Devil itself led to the later development of the Prithvi missile in the 1980s.

== Background ==
The basic rocket research in the 1960s in India was done under Project Indigo. Project Indigo was an Indo-Swiss agreement to develop intermediate-range surface-to-air missiles that was scrapped when India opted for Soviet SA-2 missiles in 1962.

== See also ==
- Project Devil – Indian surface-to-surface missile project
