= Guided missiles of India =

India has studied, produced and used various strategic and tactical missile systems since its independence. Decades long projects have realised development of all types of missile systems including ballistic, cruise, anti-ship, air-defence, air-to-air and anti-missile systems. India is one of seven countries in the world with intercontinental ballistic missiles (ICBMs) and one of four countries with anti-ballistic missile systems. Since 2016, India has been a member of Missile Technology Control Regime (MTCR).

The use of rockets for warfare in India has been recorded in as early as the 18th century. Mysorean rockets were the first iron-cased rockets in world that were successfully deployed for military use. Mysore's conflict with East India Company exposed British to the technology leading to development of Congreve rockets and introduction of rocketry in Europe.

Research in missile technology resumed again after India's independence along with the weapons of mass destruction. Development of nuclear weapons was followed by various missile programs in 70s with development of various ballistic, cruise, surface-to-air, anti- ballistic missile and orbital launch systems. India conducted its first nuclear test and initiated with Project Devil as an attempt to reverse engineer Soviet surface-to-air missile SA-2 Guideline and Project Valiant to develop an intercontinental ballistic missile. However, it could not succeed and experience gained led to development of Prithvi series of short-range ballistic missiles. In early 80s, India conducted its first successful orbital launch and synchronized its research institutions under IGMDP and successfully developed a series of strategic missile systems. The project began in early 1980s and ended in 2008, after these strategic missiles were successfully developed. The last major missile developed under the program was the Agni 3 intermediate-range ballistic missile which was successfully tested on 9 July 2007. Since then, India has developed, tested, operationalized, and is developing several missile systems that are limited to only a handful of countries including ICBMs, ASATs, SLBMs and hypersonic weapon systems. Threats posed by enemy missile systems led to the pursuit of Indian Ballistic Missile Defense Programme.

In 2017, India produced most of defined MTCR defined missile technologies required to be integrated to produce most missile systems. As per G Satheesh Reddy, India achieved complete self reliance in missile technology.

== History ==
=== Kingdom of Mysore ===
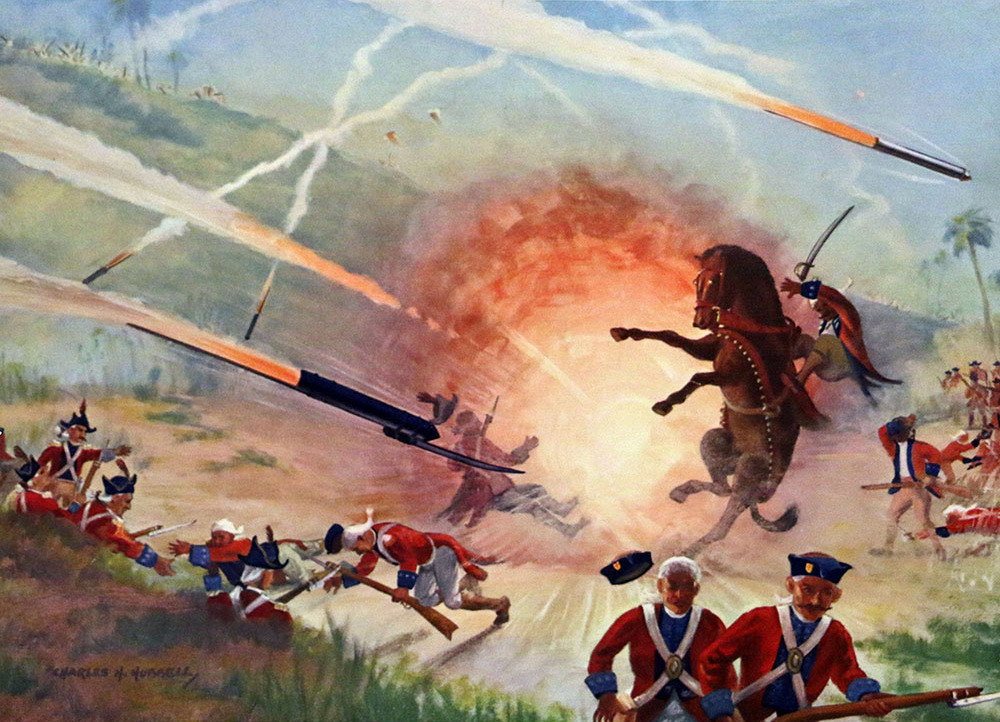
Tipu Sultan's troops rout the British using rockets in 1780 at the Battle of Guntur. The closely massed, British troops broke and ran when the Mysore army laid down a rocket barrage in their midst.

Mysorean rockets were the first iron-cased rockets that were successfully deployed for military use. Kingdom of Mysore utilised them effectively in the conflicts against the British East India Company. In addition, wheeled rocket launchers capable of launching five to ten rockets almost simultaneously were used in war. These rockets were re-engineered as Congreve rockets by British opening the door of development of advanced rocketry further in Europe.

=== Post-independence ===
Indian government constituted a teamd Special Weapons Development Team in 1958 to study guided missile systems.

The phase-I of missile program was limited to development of a first generation anti-tank guided missile (ATGM) by DRDO. Liquid fuel rocket engines based on Soviet missile system SA-2 were developed. Despite the overall failure of DRDO to develop a reliable ATGM, Indian laboratories had established facilities useful for machining and fabricating various parts of missile systems including gyroscopes, actuators, silver oxide-zinc batteries, booster and sustainer motors, air frame hard- ware such as fiberglass wings, ground launcher mechanisms, and wire spool winding and reeling mechanisms. India later excepted the French offer to produce SS-11B anti-tank guided missiles in 1970s. In another phase initiated in 1970s, Project Devil to reverse engineer Soviet SA-2 Guideline and Project Valiant to develop an Inter-continental ballistic missile too ended up with limited success but imparting experience and facilities for further research on missiles and space rockets. DRDO simultaneously focused on building a guidance package – an essential part of a long-range missile that determines its path and accuracy to hit a target. A platform-based inertial navigation system (INS) was developed and tested, on board an Avro aircraft, in 1974–75. Subsequently, an INS was built for both missiles and an aircraft, and this was tested in 1979 on board a Canberra aircraft. Decade of 1980s witnessed India gaining significant grounds in rocket technology and various technology demonstration programs began which became the basis of modern rocket systems in India. DRDL had developed competencies in the fields of propulsion, navigation and manufacture of materials. Indian Space Research Organisation had successfully tested India's first orbital rocket SLV-3 in 1980 whose first stage was used in Agni-TD ballistic missile for technological demonstration of Agni missile family. This subsequently led to the birth of the Integrated Guided Missile Development Program and Dr. Abdul Kalam, who had previously been the project director for the SLV-3 programme at ISRO, was inducted as the DRDL Director in 1983 to conceive and lead it. He decided that DRDL would pursue multiple projects in this area simultaneously. Thus, four projects were born under the IGMDP; Short-range surface-to-surface missile (code-named Prithvi), Short-range low-level surface-to-air missile (code-named Trishul), Medium-range surface-to-air missile (code-named Akash) and Third-generation anti-tank missile (code-named Nag).

The Agni missile was initially conceived in the IGMDP as a technology demonstrator project in the form of a re-entry vehicle, and was later upgraded to a ballistic missile with different ranges. As part of this program, the Interim Test Range at Balasore in Orissa was also developed for missile testing.

The fourth phase of India's missile program stretched from mid-1990s to early 21st century. The phase has witnessed limited series production of DRDO's missiles and their deployment in battlefields. DRDO further embarked on programs in developing submarine-launched ballistic missile Sagarika, cruise missiles BrahMos, naval variant of Prithvi Dhanush. Spanning from 1970s to 2000s, India's missile programs have transitioned into a self-sustaining character. Over the period from then, India has made improvements in technology of its missile systems and has produced many missile systems including ICBMs, anti-ballistic missiles, air-to-air missiles, cruise missiles and other systems.

=== Diplomatic and technological hurdles ===
After India test-fired the first Prithvi missile in 1988, and the Agni missile in 1989, the Missile Technology Control Regime (then an informal grouping established in 1987 by Canada, France, Germany, Italy, Japan, the United Kingdom and the United States) decided to restrict access to any technology that would help India in its missile development program. Some of the major technology which was denied, included:

- phase shifters for the phased array radars for Akash (denied by the USA).
- magnesium alloy used in Prithvi's wings (denied by Germany).
- servo-valves needed for the electro-hydraulic control systems of Agni and Prithvi.
- gyroscopes and accelerometers (denied by France).
- processors – Intel said it would not give India chips for the computers used in Prithvi and Agni.

To counter the MTCR, the IGMDP team formed a consortium of DRDO laboratories, industries and academic institutions to build these sub-systems, components and materials. Though this slowed down the progress of the program, India successfully developed indigenously all the restricted components denied to it by the MTCR.

In 2011, the DRDO Chief V K Saraswat had stated that "indigenous content" in India's strategic missiles had gone up to such a level, with ring-laser gyros, composite rocket motors, micro-navigation systems etc., that "no technology control regime" could derail them any longer.

== Missile Programs and Series ==
=== Abandoned programs ===
==== DRDO Anti Tank Missile ====
In 1959, Indian agencies conducted feasibility study to develop a first generation wire guided anti-tank missile.DRDO Anti Tank Missile. The Sino-Indian war in 1962 induced the government to fund the project. Designing and wind tunnel tests went on to develop an ATGM of a range of 0.5 to 2 km with flight speed of about 90 m/s. The missile was terminated eventually in 1969 once Indian army upgraded its requirements of an ATGM of range from 1.6 km to 2 km.

==== Project Devil: Surface to Air Missile ====
The aim of Project Devil was to reverse engineer the Soviet SA-2 Guideline missile to produce an indigenous short-range surface-to-air missile. The program initially waned in favour of Project Valiant but was revived later after 1974. Although DRDL had developed and tested various systems for the missile, it was later completely cancelled in 1980 due to disputes between officials and technologies were utilised in other missile programs.

==== Project Valiant: Intercontinental Ballistic Missile ====
Project Valiant was one of two early liquid-fuelled missile projects developed by India, along with Project Devil in the 1970s. The goal of Project Valiant was to produce an ICBM with 30 tonne engines and a range of 8,000 km (5,000 mi). Valiant missile was envisaged as an 85 tonnes liquid fueled three-staged ICBM. The missile although could reach near the stages of grounding testing, DRDO's interest in program waned due to internal disputes. ISRO was later approached with an offer to use missile for civilian uses which they declined leading to overall closure of the project. Although discontinued in 1974 without achieving full success, Project Valiant, like Project Devil, helped in the development of the Prithvi missile in the 1980s. Though never reached fruition, the projects were important precursors to the Prithvi missile developed in the 1980s.

==== Trishul ====
Trishul was a short-range surface-to-air missile to be used against low flying and sea-skimming targets. The range of the missile is 12 km and is fitted with a 15 kg warhead. The overall weight of the missile is 130 kg. Due to delay in development time and various deficiencies, Trishul could never enter production and service beyond testing and was substituted by Israeli Barak 1 missile. The project was officially closed in 2008 and DRDO embarked on more surface-to-air missile programs later.

=== Successful and ongoing programs ===
==== Integrated Guided Missile Development Program ====
The Integrated Guided Missile Development Program (IGMDP) was a Ministry of Defence (India) programme for the research and development of a comprehensive range of missiles. The program was managed by the Defence Research and Development Organisation (DRDO) and Ordnance Factories Board in partnership with other Indian government research organisations. The program envisaged development of five strategic systems. Prithvi series of short ranged ballistic missiles, Trishul low altitude, short-range surface-to-air missile, Akash medium-range surface-to-air missile and Nag third generation anti-tank guided missile followed by Agni series of medium and long-range ballistic missiles. The project began in early 1980s and ended in 2008 after these strategic missiles were successfully developed. The last major missile developed under the program was the Agni 3 intermediate-range ballistic missile which was successfully tested on 9 July 2007.

On 8 January 2008, the DRDO formally announced the successful completion of the IGMDP. It added that the strategic integrated guided missile program was completed with its design objectives achieved since most of the missiles in the program had been developed and inducted by the Indian armed forces.

Further variants of Prithvi missile, Akash-NG, Agni-IV, Agni-V, Agni-VI and Agni based K missile family went ahead later as independent projects.

==== Akash ====
Akash is a medium-range mobile surface-to-air missile system developed by the Defence Research and Development Organisation (DRDO), Ordnance Factories Board and Bharat Electronics Limited (BEL) in India. The missile system can target aircraft, cruise missiles, air to surface missiles and ballistic missiles up to 30 km to 60 km away, at altitudes up to 18,000 m. Variants like Akash-1S and Akash-NG have longer ranges, higher accuracy, higher mobility and lower reaction time.

==== Anti-tank missiles ====
Nag, also referred as Prospina, is the currently serving third generation "Fire-and-forget" anti-tank guided missile developed under the Integrated Guided Missile Development Program (IGMDP). Nag has been developed at a cost of ₹3 billion (US$31.2 million). Nag has an operational range from 500 m to 20 km (12 mi) and first shot hit probability exceeding 90%. Nag also has its man-portable, helicopter mounted, Stand-off and IFV mounted versions.

Besides Nag, BDL's Amogha series is currently undergoing trials and will have land-attack, man-portable and air-launched variants. Armament Research and Development Establishment (ARDE) is testing a laser-guided, tank gun-launched SAMHO missile able to destroy tanks and low-flying helicopters. Besides state-run programmes, Indian private firms have been emerging with ATGM systems.

==== Tactical ballistic missiles ====
Prithvi missiles were tactical surface-to-surface short-range ballistic missiles (SRBM) and were first ballistic missiles to be developed and enter service in India. It goes from Prithvi-I (SS-150) with 150 km (93 mi) range to Prithvi-II (SS-250) and Prithvi-III (SS-350) with ranges of up to 350 km (220 mi). Dhanush or navalised Prithvi is a system consisting of a stabilisation platform (Bow) and the Missile (Arrow). It is intended for the Indian Navy, to be fired from ships against other ships or land targets. Dhanush can fire modified versions of Prithvi-II or Prithvi-III with ranges high as 750 km (470 mi).

Solid fueled Prahar and Pranash are being tested to replace existing Prithvi missiles. Export variant "Pragati" was exhibited in South Korea in 2013 but didn't receive any orders. Pralay is another battlefield range ballistic missile with better range being developed from PDV anti-ballistic missile.

==== Agni series and Surya ====
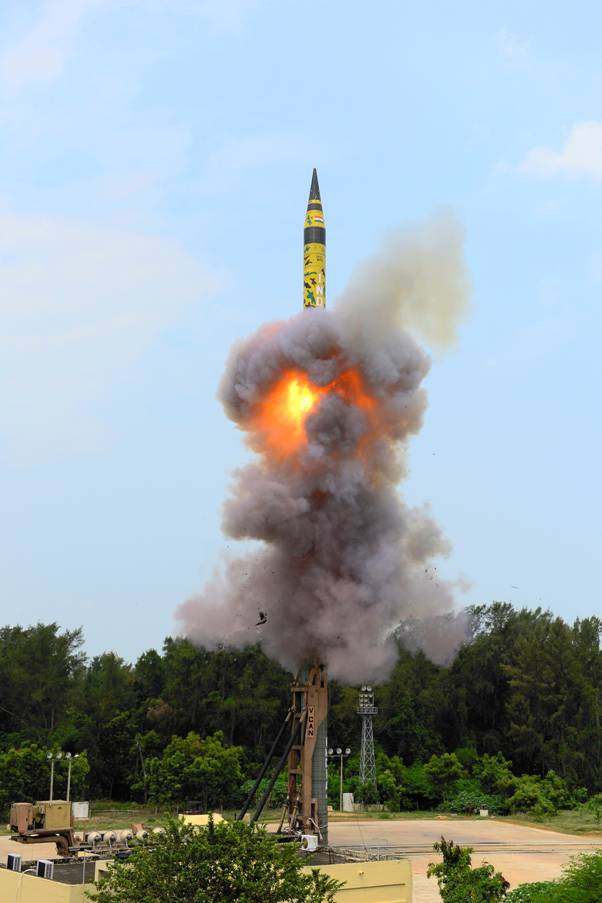
Agni-V ICBM

The Agni missile series began as a "Re-Entry Vehicle" project (later rechristened as Agni Technology Demonstrator) in the IGMDP. It subsequently gave rise to the series of India's medium-range, intermediate-range and intercontinental ballistic missiles. Agni-I, Agni-II and Agni-III missiles were developed under the Integrated Guided Missile Development Program.

Longer range Agni-IV and Agni-V with intercontinental ranges and MIRV emerged in early 2010s as separate projects.

Agni-P, an upgraded successor of Agni-I and Agni-II, was tested in 2021 with ability to carry maneuverable reentry vehicle (MaRV). Agni-P has improved propellant, navigation and guided systems and reportedly can be used as an ASBM against aircraft carriers.

Agni-VI is another Intercontinental ballistic missile reported to be in rudimentary stages of development by India, and until May 2012 was not officially confirmed by either the Government of India or the DRDO. Reportedly, it will be able to be launched from submarines or from land and to strike a target of over 10,000 km (6,200 mi) with MIRV-ed warheads. Top DRDO scientists have previously asserted that India has almost all the equipment and technology needed to develop ICBMs, "but where the warhead should go or what the range should be will have to be a political call". In 1995 in a report published by magazine Nonproliferation review, DRDO was working on an ICBM called Surya with a range of 12,000–16,000 km (7,500–9,900 mi). Although, the actual status of missile always remained unknown in public domain. Sources have speculated that Agni-VI might be Surya under new codename.

Later, Agni-V would go on to acquire MIRV capabilities

==== K series ====
K (named after Abdul Kalam) are submarine-launched ballistic missiles (SLBM) of India. SLBM variants of Agni missiles meant to arm India's nuclear submarines, their ranges vary from medium-range K-15 to intercontinental range K-6 (missile).

The Shaurya missile is a land attack variant of K-15 missile. The missile has a hypersonic speed and a hybrid ballistic-cruise trajectory.

==== BrahMos ====
BrahMos (also known as PJ-10) are supersonic to hypersonic cruise missiles developed in collaboration between India and Russia. BrahMos have land attack, ship and submarine-launched and air-launched versions and are the fastest cruise missiles in world in operation. The existing versions of missiles include supersonic land-attack, anti-ship ship-launched versions meanwhile longer range, hypersonic and air-launched versions are under development.

==== Other cruise missile programs ====
Nirbhay is the Indian long-range subsonic cruise missile under development and testing, expecting its air and submarine-launched version after trials. It was successfully test fired for second time from Balasore Orissa. Able to travel at speed of 0.6-0.9 mach. However, its test on 12 October 2020 failed due to a technical snag. It has succeeded in other tests before and has been approved for limited production in 2020. An upgraded version of the missile is reportedly under development. It is currently deployed on LAC in limited numbers since 2020 due to 2020 China-India standoff.

Nirbhay project is now technically closed after completing six developmental trials. The next phase of tests will happen from April 2020 under a new name called Indigenous Technology Cruise Missile (ITCM). It will include Short Turbo Fan Engine (STFE) developed by Gas Turbine Research Establishment (GTRE) and a Radio-frequency (RF) seeker from Research Centre Imarat (RCI). A separate air-launched variant and submarine-launched variant is under active development. Several cruise missile systems are expected to be introduced from experience gained with Nirbhay.

==== Astra ====
Astra are India's fifth-generation beyond-visual-range active radar homing air-to-air missile series. The current version in service has a range from 10 km (6.2 mi) to 110 km (68 mi) similar to AIM-120 AMRAAM while versions up to 350 km (220 mi) and intermediate ranges are being developed.

A surface-to-air missile variant VL-SRSAM has also been developed from Astra to replace Indian navy's Barak 1 missiTN1 With supplementary Akash missile systems along, it forms a surface-to-air missile system similar to American NASAM 2.

==== Indian Ballistic Missile Defence Programme ====
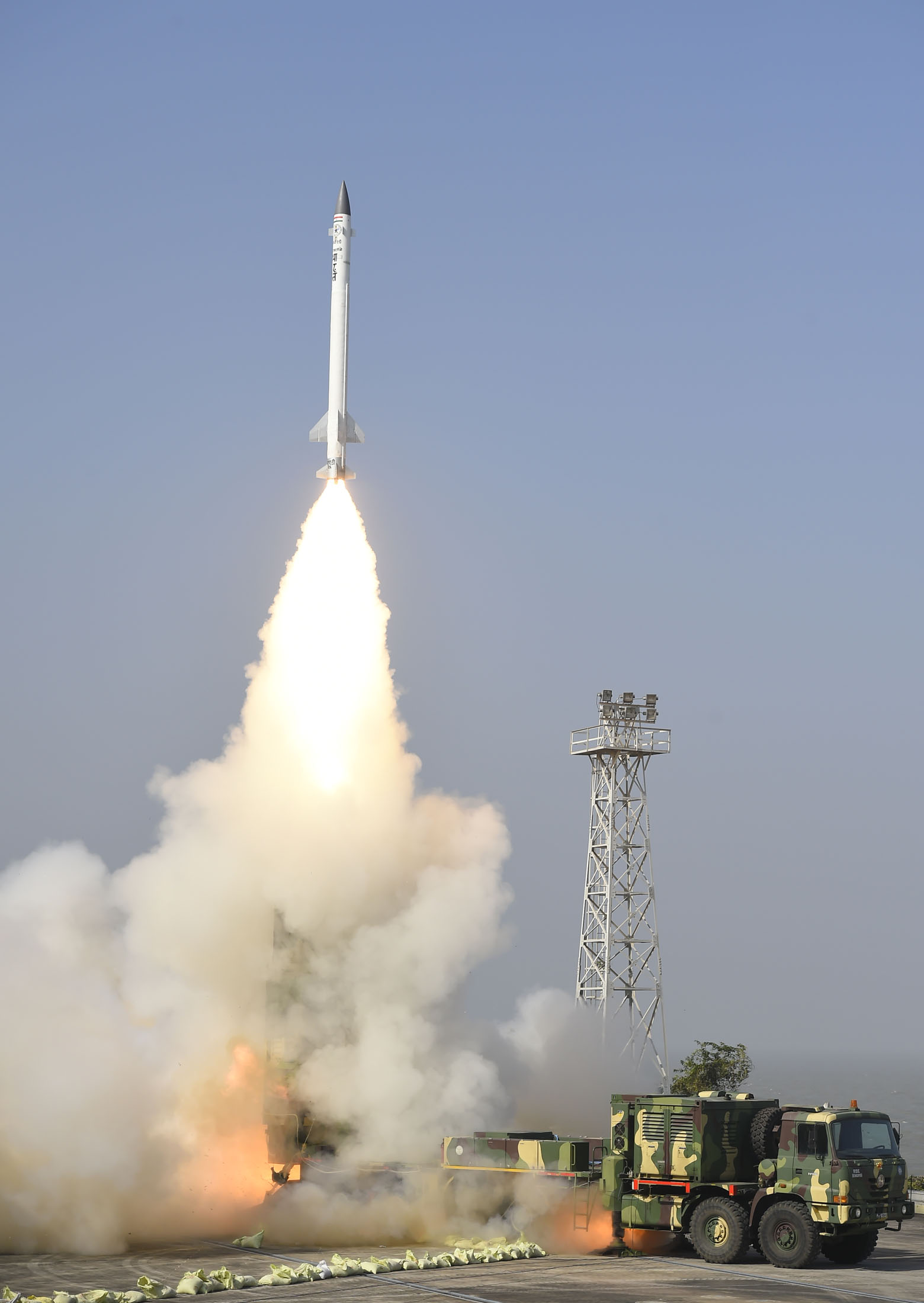
AAD anti-ballistic missile

In wake of missile threats from China and Pakistan, the development of anti-ballistic missiles began in the late 1990s. The program consists of multiple phases and components. Phase-I of program is a double-tiered system consisting of two land and sea-based interceptor missiles, namely the Prithvi Air Defence (PAD) missile for high altitude interception, and the Advanced Air Defence (AAD) Missile for lower altitude interception. The two-tiered shield should be able to intercept any incoming missile launched from 5,000 kilometres away. The system also includes an overlapping network of early warning and tracking radars, as well as command and control posts. Phase-I is awaiting government's approval for installation over national capital. Phase-II would include more potent AD-1 and AD-2 anti-ballistic missiles capable of engaging without IRBMs, ICBMs and hypersonic cruise missiles. Prithvi Defence Vehicle (PDV) Mk. 1 and II are also under trials to intercept missiles at higher altitude and longer ranges and replace existing PAD. PDV Mk. 2 has also demonstrated anti-satellite capability.

==== Other systems ====
Hypersonic Technology Demonstrator Vehicle (HSTDV) is a technology demonstrator aimed to demonstrate autonomous flight of a Scramjet Integrated Vehicle using ethylene. The technology is expected to become the basis of India's hypersonic missiles and aircraft in future. India has developed an Anti-Radiation Missile (ARM) that will help to destroy enemy advance warning systems. This was named as Rudram-1, with a range of 100–250 km. Production of the ARM is being done on a priority basis by the Defence Research and Development Laboratory (DRDL), which specialises in missile development. Such missiles can be mounted on the Sukhoi Su-30 MKI fighter planes.

== List of guided missiles ==
=== Air to air ===
Family	Name	Type	Maximum range	Speed	Warhead	Introduction	Status	Ref
Astra (missile)	Astra Mk1	active radar homing beyond visual range air-to-air missile	110 km (68 mi)	Mach 4.5	High-explosive pre-fragmented warhead	2018	In Service	
Astra (missile)	Astra Mk2	active radar homing beyond visual range air-to-air missile	160 km (99 mi)	Mach 4.5	High-explosive pre-fragmented warhead	TBD	In trials	
Astra (missile)	Astra Mk3	active radar homing beyond visual range air-to-air missile	350 km (220 mi)	Mach 4.5	High-explosive pre-fragmented warhead	TBD	In trials	
Novator KS-172		beyond visual range air-to-air missile	200 to 300 km (120 to 190 mi)	Mach 3.3	High-explosive fragmentated directional warhead	2007	In Service	
Solid Fuel Ducted Ramjet		Technology demonstration testbed for future beyond visual range missile air-to-air missile	350 km (220 mi)	Mach 4.5		TBD	In trials	
MICA (missile)		beyond visual range air-to-air missile	500 m to 60 km	Mach 4		2012	In service	

=== Anti-radiation ===
Name	Type	Maximum range	Warhead	Introduction	Status	Ref
Rudram-1	Anti-radiation missile	150 km (93 mi)	Conventional	2022	In service	
Rudram-2	Air to surface anti-radiation missile	300 km (190 mi)	Conventional	TBD	Under development	
Rudram-3	Air to surface missile	550 km (340 mi)	Conventional	TBD	Under development	

=== Anti-satellite ===
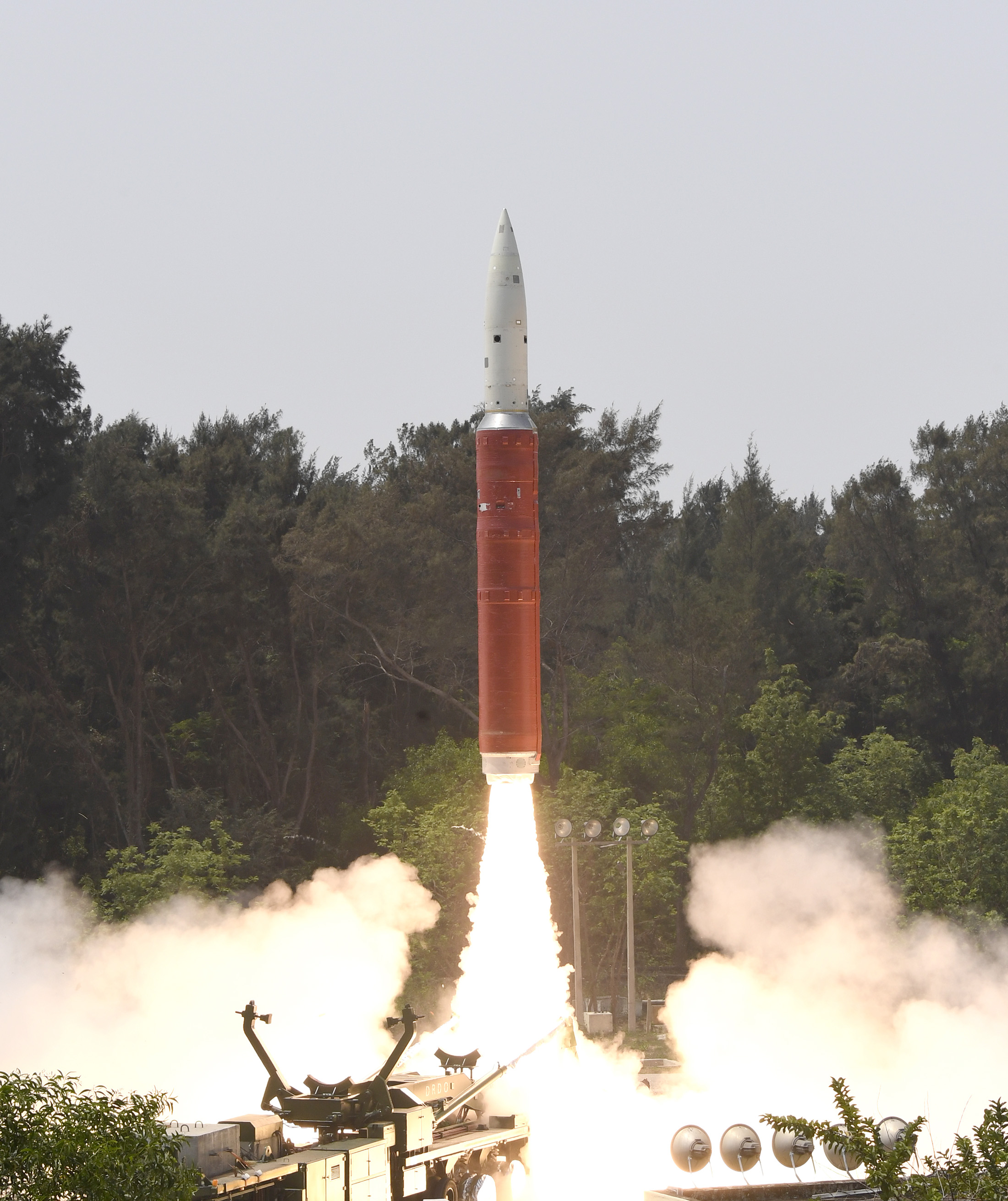
Prithvi Defence Vehicle Mark 2

Family	Name	Type	Interception altitude	Warhead	Introduction	Status	Ref
Prithvi Defence Vehicle Mark II		Exo-atmospheric Hit-to-kill anti-ballistic missile	1,200 km (750 mi)	Kinetic kill vehicle	Unknown	Being tested	

=== Anti-ship ===
Family	Name	Type	Maximum range	Warhead	Introduction	Status	Ref
NASM-SR		Short-range anti-ship missile	55+ km	Conventional or nuclear 100 kg	TBD	In user trials	
Naval anti ship missile -MR		Medium-range anti-ship missile	150–250 km	Conventional 150 kg	TBD	In development	
BrahMos	Brahmos-A	Anti-ship cruise missile	400 km	Conventional or nuclear		In Service	

=== Anti-submarine ===
Family	Name	Type	Maximum range	Warhead	Introduction	Status	Ref
SMART		Long-range anti-submarine missile	643+ km	Conventional 50 kg	TBD	In development	

=== Anti-tank ===
Family	Name	Type	Maximum range	Warhead	Introduction	Status	Ref
Nag (missile)	Prospina	Third generation land-attack ATGM	4 km (2.5 mi)	Tandem-charge high-explosive anti-tank	2016	In service	
Nag (missile)	HeliNa/Dhruvastra	Air-launched ATGM	10 km (6.2 mi)	Tandem-charge high-explosive anti-tank	TBD	Being Inducted	
Nag (missile)	Stand off Anti-Tank missile	Standoff air-launched ATGM	20 km (12 mi)	Tandem-charge high-explosive anti-tank	TBD	Development trials	
Nag (missile)	MPATGM	Man-portable anti-tank missile	2.5 km (1.6 mi)	Tandem-charge high-explosive anti-tank	TBD	Developmental trials	
Amogha missile	Amogha-1	Second-generation anti-tank guided missile	2.8 km (1.7 mi)	HEAT	TBD	Developmental trials	
Amogha missile	Air-launched Amogha	Air-launched anti-tank missile		HEAT	TBD	Proposed	
Amogha missile	Man portable Amogha	Man-portable anti-tank missile		HEAT	TBD	Proposed	
SAMHO		Cannon-launched ATGM	5 km (3.1 mi)	Tandem HEAT	TBD	Developmental trials	

=== Ballistic ===
Family	Name	Type	Maximum range	Warhead	Introduction	Status	Ref
Prithvi (missile)	Prithvi-I (SS-150)	surface-to-surface tactical ballistic missile	150 km (93 mi)	Conventional or nuclear	1994	Being withdrawn by 2030	
Prithvi (missile)	Prithvi-II (SS-250)	surface-to-surface short-range ballistic missile	250 to 350 km (160 to 220 mi)	Conventional or nuclear	2003	Being withdrawn by 2030	
Prithvi (missile)	Prithvi-III (SS-350)	surface-to-surface short-range ballistic missile	350 to 600 km (220 to 370 mi)	Conventional or nuclear	2004	In Service	
Prithvi (missile)	Dhanush	surface-to-surface anti-ship ballistic missile	350 to 750 km (220 to 470 mi)	Conventional or nuclear	2018	In Service	
Agni (missile)	Agni-I	surface-to-surface medium-range ballistic missile	900 to 1,200 km (560 to 750 mi)	Conventional or nuclear	2002	In Service	
Agni (missile)	Agni-P	surface-to-surface medium-range ballistic missile	1,000 to 2,000 km (620 to 1,240 mi)	Conventional or nuclear	2021	In development	
Agni (missile)	Agni-II	surface-to-surface medium-range ballistic missile	2,000 to 3,500 km (1,200 to 2,200 mi)	Conventional or nuclear	2010	In Service	
Agni (missile)	Agni-III	surface-to-surface intermediate-range ballistic missile	3,500 to 5,000 km (2,200 to 3,100 mi)	Conventional or nuclear	2011	In Service	
Agni (missile)	Agni-IV	surface-to-surface intermediate-range ballistic missile	4,000 km (2,500 mi)	Conventional or nuclear	2014	In Service	
Agni (missile)	Agni-V	surface-to-surface intercontinental ballistic missile	5,500 to 8,000 km (3,400 to 5,000 mi)	Conventional or nuclear	2018	In Service	
Agni (missile)	Agni-VI	surface-to-surface intercontinental ballistic missile	10,000 to 12,000 km (6,200 to 7,500 mi)	Conventional or nuclear	TBD	In development	
Surya missile		surface-to-surface intercontinental ballistic missile	16,000 km (9,900 mi)	Conventional or nuclear	Unknown	Unconfirmed	
K missile family	K-15 (Sagarika)	short-range submarine-launched ballistic missile	750 km (470 mi)	Conventional or nuclear	2018	In Service	
K missile family	K-4	medium-range submarine-launched ballistic missile	3,500 km (2,200 mi)	Conventional or nuclear	2024	In Service	
K missile family	K-5	intermediate-range submarine-launched ballistic missile (IR-SLBM)	5,000 km (3,100 mi)	Conventional or nuclear	TBD	In development	
K missile family	K-6	intercontinental submarine-launched ballistic missile (IC-SLBM)	6,000 to 8,000 km (3,700 to 5,000 mi)	Conventional or nuclear	TBD	In development	
Prahaar	Prahaar	surface-to-surface tactical ballistic missile	150 km (93 mi)	Conventional or nuclear	TBD	In trials	
Prahaar	Pragati	surface-to-surface tactical ballistic missile	170 km (110 mi)	Conventional	—N/a (For export)	In development	
Prahaar	Pranash	surface-to-surface tactical ballistic missile	200 km (120 mi)	Conventional	TBD	In development	
Pralay		surface-to-surface short-range ballistic missile (SRBM)	500 km (310 mi)	Conventional	TBD	In service	

=== Cruise ===
Family	Name	Type	Maximum range	Speed	Warhead	Introduction	Status	Ref
BrahMos	BrahMos Block I	Supersonic ship-launched anti-ship / land-attack cruise missile	290 km (180 mi)	Mach 3	Conventional or nuclear	2007	In service	
BrahMos	BrahMos Block I	Supersonic land-launched land-attack / anti-ship cruise missile	290 km (180 mi)	Mach 3	Conventional or nuclear	2008/2010	In service	
BrahMos	BrahMos Block II	Supersonic land-launched land-attack cruise missile	290 km (180 mi)	Mach 3	Conventional or nuclear	2012	In service	
BrahMos	BrahMos Block III	Supersonic land-launched land-attack cruise missile	290 km (180 mi)	Mach 3	Conventional or nuclear	2013	In service	
BrahMos	BrahMos-A	Supersonic air-launched land-attack / anti-ship cruise missile	400 km (250 mi)	Mach 3	Conventional or nuclear	2020	In service	
BrahMos	Submarine-launched BrahMos	Supersonic submarine-launched anti-ship / land-attack cruise missile	290 km (180 mi)	Mach 3	Conventional or nuclear	2013	In service	
BrahMos	BrahMos ER	Multi-platform multirole supersonic cruise missile	600 km (370 mi)	Mach 3	Conventional or nuclear	2022	In service	
BrahMos	BrahMos NG	Multi-platform multirole supersonic cruise missile	290 km (180 mi)	Mach 3	Conventional or nuclear	TBD	In development	
BrahMos-II		Hypersonic cruise missile	600–1,000 km (370–620 mi)	Mach 8	Conventional or nuclear	TBD	In development	
Nirbhay (missile)		Subsonic land-attack cruise missile	1,000–1,500 km (620–930 mi)	Mach 0.9	Conventional or nuclear	2019	In service	

=== Surface-to-air ===
Family	Name	Type	Maximum range	Interception altitude	Speed	Warhead	Introduction	Status	Ref
VSHORAD (India)		Very short-range surface-to-air missile	6 km (3.7 mi)	3.5 km (2.2 mi)	Mach 1.5	High explosive		In development trials	
Trishul (missile)		Short-range surface-to-air missile	9 km (5.6 mi)		Mach 1+	High explosive	1983	Retired	
Akash (missile)	Akash Mk I	Medium-range surface-to-air missile	30 km (19 mi)	18 km (11 mi)	Mach 2.8-3.5	High-explosive, pre-fragmented warhead	2009	In service	
Akash (missile)	Akash Mk II	Medium-range surface-to-air missile	40 km (25 mi)	20 km (12 mi)	Mach 2.8-3.5	High-explosive, pre-fragmented warhead	TBA	Developmental trials	
Akash (missile)	Akash-NG	Medium-range surface-to-air missile	70 km (43 mi)	20 km (12 mi)	Mach 2.8-3.5	High-explosive, pre-fragmented warhead	TBA	Developmental trials	
Maitri (missile)		Quick reaction surface-to-air missile	30 km (19 mi)					The proposal has been shelved and superseded by the QRSAM and VL-SRSAM missiles for the use of the Indian Army and Indian Navy respectively.	
QRSAM		Quick reaction surface-to-air missile	30 km (19 mi)	10 km (6.2 mi)			2022	Being inducted	
VL-SRSAM		Short-range surface-to-air missile	50 km (31 mi)			High-explosive, pre-fragmented warhead		Being tested	
SAMAR Air Defence System		Short-range surface-to-air missile	12–40 km (7.5–24.9 mi)			High-explosive, pre-fragmented warhead		In use	
Barak 8	MRSAM	Medium-range surface-to-air missile	70 km (43 mi)	16 km (9.9 mi)	Mach 2+	Proximity censor based	2020	In service	
Barak 8	LRSAM	Long-range surface-to-air missile	100 km (62 mi)	16 km (9.9 mi)	Mach 2+	Proximity censor based	2019	In service	
ER-SAM		Extended-range surface-to-air missile	250 km (160 mi)			High explosive	TBD	In development	
XR-SAM		Long-range surface-to-air missile	400 km (250 mi)			High explosive	TBD	In development	

=== Ballistic Missile Defence ===
Family	Name	Type	Maximum range	Interception altitude	Speed	Warhead	Introduction	Status	Ref
Phase I of Indian Ballistic Missile Defence Programme	Prithvi Air Defence	Exo-atmospheric anti-ballistic missile	300 km (190 mi)-2,000 km (1,200 mi)	50 km (31 mi)-180 km (110 mi)	Mach 5+	Proximity fuze	2006	Being inducted	
Phase I of Indian Ballistic Missile Defence Programme	Advanced Air Defence	Endo-atmospheric anti-ballistic missile	150 km (93 mi)	15 km (9.3 mi)-40 km (25 mi)	Mach 4.5	Hit-to-kill	2007	Being inducted	
Phase I of Indian Ballistic Missile Defence Programme	Prithvi Defence Vehicle	Exo-atmospheric anti-ballistic missile	2,000 km (1,200 mi)	150 km (93 mi)		Hit-to-kill	2019	In trials	
Phase II of Indian Ballistic Missile Defence Programme	Prithvi Defence Vehicle Mark-II	Exo-atmospheric anti-ballistic missile		1,200 km (750 mi)		Hit-to-kill	TBD	Developmental trials	
Phase II of Indian Ballistic Missile Defence Programme	AD-1	Anti-ballistic missile	5,000 km (3,100 mi)	TBA		Hit-to-kill	TBD	In development	
Phase II of Indian Ballistic Missile Defence Programme	AD-2	Anti-ballistic missile	TBA	TBA		Hit-to-kill	TBD	In development	

=== Other systems ===
Family	Name	Type	Maximum range	Speed	Warhead	Introduction	Status	Ref
K missile family	Shaurya (missile)	Hypersonic surface to surface tactical missile	700 km (430 mi)	Mach 7.5	Conventional or nuclear	2011	In service	
Hypersonic Technology Demonstrator Vehicle		Testbed for development of hypersonic systems		Mach 12	—N/a	2019	Being tested	

== Guided and unguided rocket systems ==
Family	Name	Type	Maximum range	Speed	Warhead	Introduction	Status	Ref
Pinaka multi-barrel rocket launcher	Pinaka Mk I	Multiple rocket launcher	40 km (25 mi)		Various	1998	In service	
Pinaka multi-barrel rocket launcher	Pinaka Mk II/Guided Pinaka	Multiple rocket launcher	90 km (56 mi)		Various	TBA	In trials	
Indian long-range MRL		Multiple rocket launcher	120 km (75 mi)		Various	TBD	In development	

== Research and development organisations ==
Current missile research and development in India happens under the Defence Research and Development Laboratory (DRDL), and a group of laboratories collectively called the Missile Complex Laboratories.

- Interim Test Range
- Bharat Dynamics Limited Manufactures the missile and also has an associated R&D lab
- Composite Products Development Centre
- Defence Metallurgical Research Laboratory Develops materials for defence and space usage
- Dr APJ Abdul Kalam Missile Complex Houses following 3 laboratories:
  - Advanced Systems Laboratory Research and development on motors, jet vanes and structures for launch vehicles and missiles
  - Research Centre Imarat (Develops navigation and electromechanical actuation systems)
  - Defence Research and Development Laboratory (DRDL) famous for its contributions to Integrated Guided Missile Development Programme (IGMDP). Develops mission control software and among other missile related technologies.
- High Energy Materials Research Laboratory Develops propellant and explosives.
- Missile Complex Laboratories (These laboratories were earlier part of the DRDL or set up under them, but all are now independent entities)
- Missile Systems Quality Assurance Agency
- Vehicle Research and Development Establishment Develops missile launchers
- HTNP Industries Develops Hypersonic missile warheads (Nuclear capable and non nuclear capable)

== See also ==
- Indian Armed Forces
- India-China Border Roads
- Indian Human Spaceflight Programme
- Indian weapons of mass destruction
- Indian military satellites

== Notes and references ==
=== Citations ===
- Kampani, Gaurav (2003). "Stakeholders in the Indian Strategic Missile Program" (PDF). Non-proliferation Review. 10 (3). James Martin Center for Non-Proliferation Studies: 48–70 – via Middlebury Institute of International Studies at Monterey.
