= India and weapons of mass destruction =

Republic of India
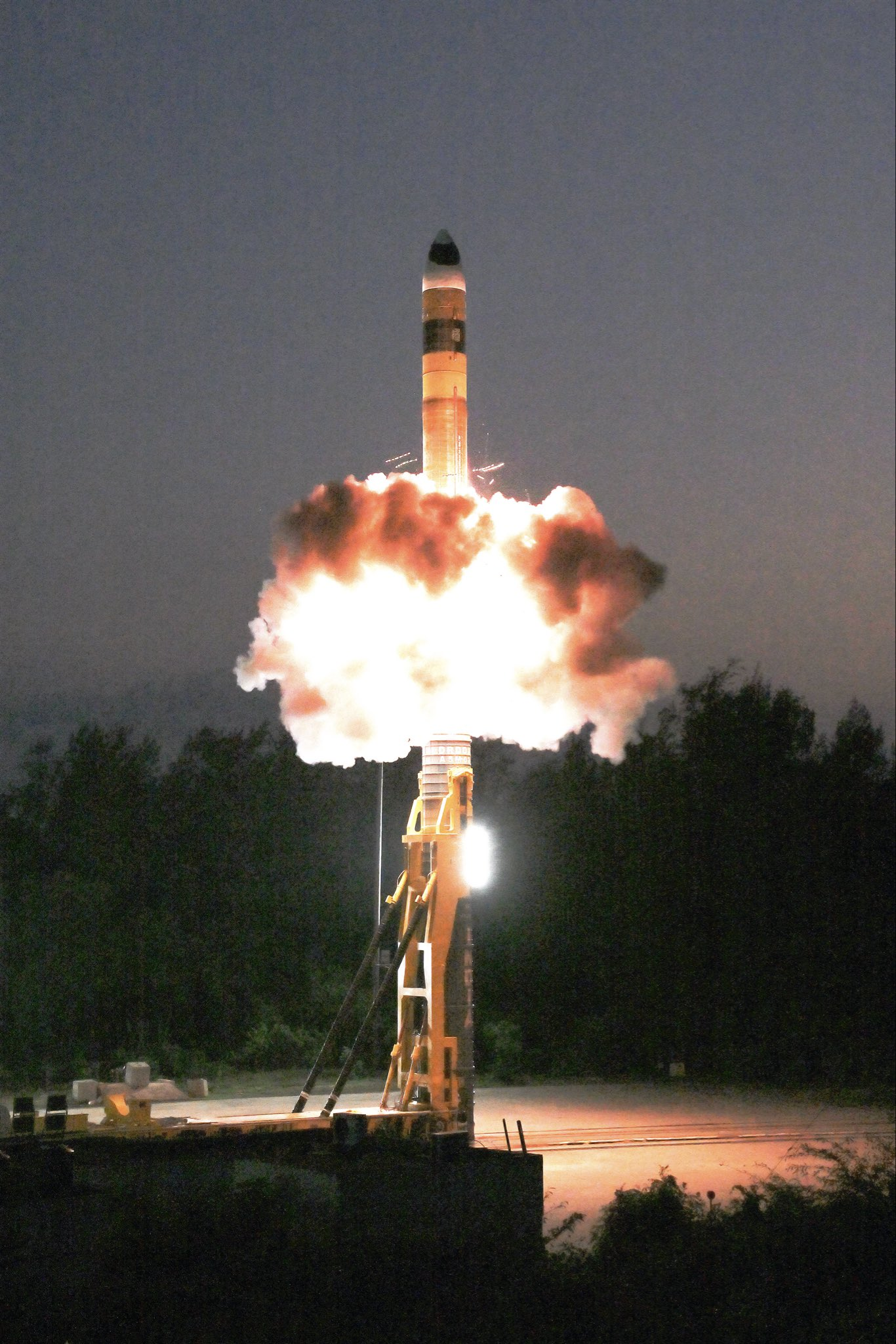
- Test launch of an Agni-V ICBM

- Location of India Territory controlled by India Territory claimed but not controlled
- Nuclear program start date: 1960 (66 years ago)
- First nuclear weapon test: 18 May 1974 (52 years ago)^{a} (Operation Smiling Buddha)
- First thermonuclear weapon test: Unclear; see (Question over thermonuclear capability)
- Last nuclear test: 13 May 1998 (28 years ago) (Operation Shakti)
- Largest yield test: 45 kilotons of TNT (190 TJ); (Government of India claims)
- Total tests: 6
- Peak stockpile: 190 warheads (2026)
- Current stockpile: 190 warheads (2026)
- Maximum missile range: Agni-V - 7,000 to 8,000 kilometres 4,300 to 5,000 miles
- Nuclear triad: Yes
- Strategic forces: Air Force; Dassault Mirage 2000; SEPECAT Jaguar; Strategic Forces Command; Prithvi SRBMs; Shaurya SRBMs; Agni MRBMS/ IRBMs; Navy; Arihant-class submarines; Sagarika SLBMs; K-4 SLBMs
- NPT party: No

India was the seventh country to develop nuclear weapons. As of 2026, India is estimated to possess 190 nuclear weapons. India previously developed chemical weapons, and is a party to the Biological Weapons Convention and the Chemical Weapons Convention. India is one of four states widely believed to possess nuclear weapons that are not a party to the Nuclear Non-Proliferation Treaty.

India operates a nuclear triad, consisting of approximately 80 Prithvi-II and Agni-series ballistic missiles from short to intercontinental range, 48 Mirage 2000H and Jaguar IS fighter-bombers, and 24 Sagarika submarine-launched ballistic missiles aboard two Arihant-class submarines. India is developing multiple independently targetable reentry vehicle-capable land and submarine-based ballistic missiles.

India maintains a no first use nuclear policy and credible minimum deterrence doctrine. Its no first use is qualified in that while India states it generally will not use nuclear weapons first, it may do so in the event of "a major attack against India, or Indian forces anywhere, by biological or chemical weapons."

In 1974, India conducted the Smiling Buddha nuclear test. In 1998, India carried out the Operation Shakti series of nuclear weapon tests. It is unclear if India has developed boosted fission or thermonuclear weapons. Initially, India's primary strategic concern was a conflict with China, while modern Indian policy focuses on potential conflict with Pakistan, which developed its own nuclear capability in 1983. India is not a party to the NPT and has not signed Comprehensive Nuclear-Test-Ban Treaty, considering both treaties flawed and discriminatory. India is the only non-NPT state to receive a waiver from the Nuclear Suppliers Group, allowing international nuclear industry commerce since 2008.

India previously declared 1,044 tons of sulfur mustard in 1997, and destroyed its stockpile by 2009, one of the seven countries to meet the OPCW extended deadline. India also participates in the Missile Technology Control Regime, Australia Group, and Hague Code of Conduct.

== Biological weapons ==
India has ratified the Biological Weapons Convention (BWC) and pledges to abide by its obligations since 1974. There is no clear evidence, circumstantial or otherwise, that directly points toward an offensive biologicial weapons programme. India does possess the scientific capability and infrastructure to launch an offensive biological programme. In terms of delivery, India also possesses the capability to produce aerosols and has numerous potential delivery systems ranging from crop dusters to sophisticated ballistic missiles.

No information exists in the public domain suggesting interest by the India in the delivery of biological agents by these or any other means. To reiterate the latter point, in October 2002, then-Indian president Abdul Kalam asserted that "India will not make biological weapons. It is cruel to human beings".

== Chemical weapons ==
In 1992, India signed the Chemical Weapons Convention (CWC), becoming one of the original signatories of the CWC in 1993, and ratified it on 2 September 1996.

In 1980, India established its chemical weapons programme, and officially notified Pakistan in 1992 of its intention of destroying its inventory of harmful chemical agents. In June 1997, India declared its stock of chemical weapons (1,045 tonnes (2,304,000 lb) of sulphur mustard). By the end of 2006, India had destroyed more than 75 percent of its chemical weapons and material stockpile and was granted an extension for destroying the remaining stocks by April 2009 and was expected to achieve 100 percent destruction within that time frame.

India informed the OPCW and the United Nations in May 2009 that it had destroyed its stockpile of chemical weapons in compliance with the international Chemical Weapons Convention, making it the third country, after South Korea and Albania, to do so. Verification was completed by the chemical weapons inspectors of the United Nations. The policy change on the chemical weapons was largely influenced from the views of former Indian army chief General Sundarji that a country having the capability of making nuclear weapons does not need to have chemical weapons, since the dread of chemical weapons could be created only in countries that do not have nuclear weapons. Others suggested that the fact that India has found chemical weapons dispensable highlighted its confidence in the conventional weapons system at its command.

India has an advanced commercial chemical industry, and produces the bulk of its chemicals for domestic consumption. It is also widely acknowledged that India has an extensive civilian chemical and pharmaceutical industry and annually exports considerable quantities of chemicals to countries such as the United Kingdom, the United States, and Taiwan.

== Nuclear weapons ==
As early as 26 June 1946, Jawaharlal Nehru, soon to be India's first Prime Minister, announced:

As long as the world is constituted as it is, every country will have to devise and use the latest devices for its protection. I have no doubt India will develop her scientific researches and I hope Indian scientists will use the atomic force for constructive purposes. But if India is threatened, she will inevitably try to defend herself by all means at her disposal.

Nehru pursued a policy of formally foregoing nuclear weapons while at the same time constructing a civilian nuclear programme and by extension the capability to make a nuclear bomb. This policy was motivated by a conventional weapons superiority over its rival China, later focusing on Pakistan. While India built its first research reactor in 1956, the weaponisation of this programme quietly started in 1960, completing its first plutonium reprocessing plant by 1964. India's nuclear programme can trace its origins to March 1944 and its three-stage efforts in technology were established by Homi J. Bhabha when he founded the nuclear research centre, the Tata Institute of Fundamental Research (TIFR) in Bombay.

Weaponisation of the nuclear programme in 1960 was widely due to the India's loss of the border war with China in 1962 that provided the Indian government a view that the development of nuclear weapons would deter the potential Chinese influence towards its northern territories. By the U.S. intelligence estimates in 1964, India was in a position to develop nuclear weapons. Prime Minister Lal Bahadur Shastri was initially sceptical of developing nuclear weapons due to fear of economic isolation but fell under intense political pressure, including elements within the ruling Indian National Congress. India was also unable to obtain security guarantees from either the Soviet Union or the United States in case of conflict with China. As a result, Shastri announced in 1966 that India would pursue the capability of what it called "peaceful nuclear explosions" that could be weaponised in the future.

In 1974, India carried out a surprise test of "crude design" of a nuclear bomb (code-named "Operation Smiling Buddha"), under Prime Minister Indira Gandhi, which the Indian government termed it as "peaceful nuclear explosion". The test used plutonium produced in the Canadian-supplied CIRUS reactor, and raised concerns that nuclear technology supplied for peaceful purposes could be diverted to weapons purposes. This also stimulated the early work of the Nuclear Suppliers Group. During the 1970s and the 1980s, the fear of international sanctions, economic isolation, and priortising the relations with the United States forced and refrained the successive governments of prime ministers Indira Gandhi, Morarji Desai, and Rajiv Gandhi towards further weaponising the nuclear programme beyond the approved civilian limits. This fear was evident when Indira Gandhi turned down the "weaponisation proposal" from the Defence Research and Development Organisation (DRDO) in 1982 but the approval was given towards the development of guided missile programme that would be developed into the deliverable nuclear payloads. India also supported international nuclear non-proliferation and arms control efforts.

After the military standoff with China in 1986 and the military standoff with Pakistan in 1987, Prime Minister Rajiv Gandhi reassessed the Indian strategic calculations and eventually asking his Defence Secretary Naresh Chandra to re-weaponise the nuclear programme which the successive Indian governments aggressively continued in the throughout the early 1990s. Around 1997, India most likely completed the weaponisation of its nuclear programme and moved it towards weapons testing in 1998 (code-named "Operation Shakti") under Prime Minister Atal Bihari Vajpayee.

In 1998, as a response to the continuing tests, the United States and Japan imposed sanctions on India, which have since been waived and lifted.

Development and weapon designs takes place on Bhabha Atomic Research Centre (BARC), a sole weapons development centre for Indian nuclear weapons.

=== India's no-first-use policy ===
India has a declared nuclear no-first-use policy and is in the process of developing a nuclear doctrine based on "credible minimum deterrence." In August 1999, the Indian government released a draft of the doctrine which asserts that nuclear weapons are solely for deterrence and that India will pursue a policy of "retaliation only". The document also maintains that India "will not be the first to initiate a nuclear first strike, but will respond with punitive retaliation should deterrence fail" and that decisions to authorize the use of nuclear weapons would be made by the Prime Minister or his 'designated successor(s)'. According to the NRDC, despite the escalation of tensions between India and Pakistan in 2001–2002, India remained committed to its nuclear no-first-use policy.

India's Strategic Nuclear Command was formally established in 2003, with an Indian Air Force officer, Air Marshal Tej Mohan Asthana, as the Commander-in-Chief. The Joint Services SNC is the custodian of all of India's nuclear weapons, missiles and defense assets. It is also responsible for executing all aspects of India's nuclear policy. However, the civil leadership, in the form of the CCS (Cabinet Committee on Security) is the only body authorised to order a nuclear strike against another offending strike. The National Security Advisor Shivshankar Menon reiterated a policy of "no first use" against nuclear weapon states and "non-use against non-nuclear weapon states" in a speech on the occasion of Golden Jubilee celebrations of National Defence College in New Delhi on 21 October 2010, a doctrine Menon said reflected India's "strategic culture, with its emphasis on minimal deterrence. In April 2013 Shyam Saran, convener of the National Security Advisory Board, affirmed that regardless of the size of a nuclear attack against India, be it a miniaturised version or a "big" missile, India will retaliate massively to inflict unacceptable damage.

In 2016, Defence Minister Manohar Parrikar questioned the no-first-use policy, asking why India should "bind" itself when it is a "responsible nuclear power". Later he clarified that this was his personal opinion. Defence Minister Rajnath Singh in 2019 said that in the future, India's no-first-use policy might change depending upon the "circumstances". In a January 2022 statement, however, the Ministry of External Affairs reiterated India's doctrine of "maintaining a credible minimum deterrence based on a No First Use posture and non-use of nuclear weapons against non-nuclear weapon states".

As of 2025, India's no-first-use policy is qualified. It states that it will not engage in first use of nuclear weapons except in the event of "a major attack against India, or Indian forces anywhere, by biological or chemical weapons.

=== Indian nuclear triad ===
India's nuclear triad is a military force structure that includes three parts:

- Intercontinental ballistic missiles (ICBMs): Land-based nuclear missiles
- Submarine-launched ballistic missiles (SLBMs): Nuclear-missile-armed submarines
- Strategic bombers: Aircraft with nuclear bombs and missiles

The purpose of India's nuclear triad is to increase nuclear deterrence by reducing the chance of an enemy destroying all of India's nuclear forces in a first-strike attack. This ensures that India can still launch a second strike.

==== Air-borne nuclear weapons ====
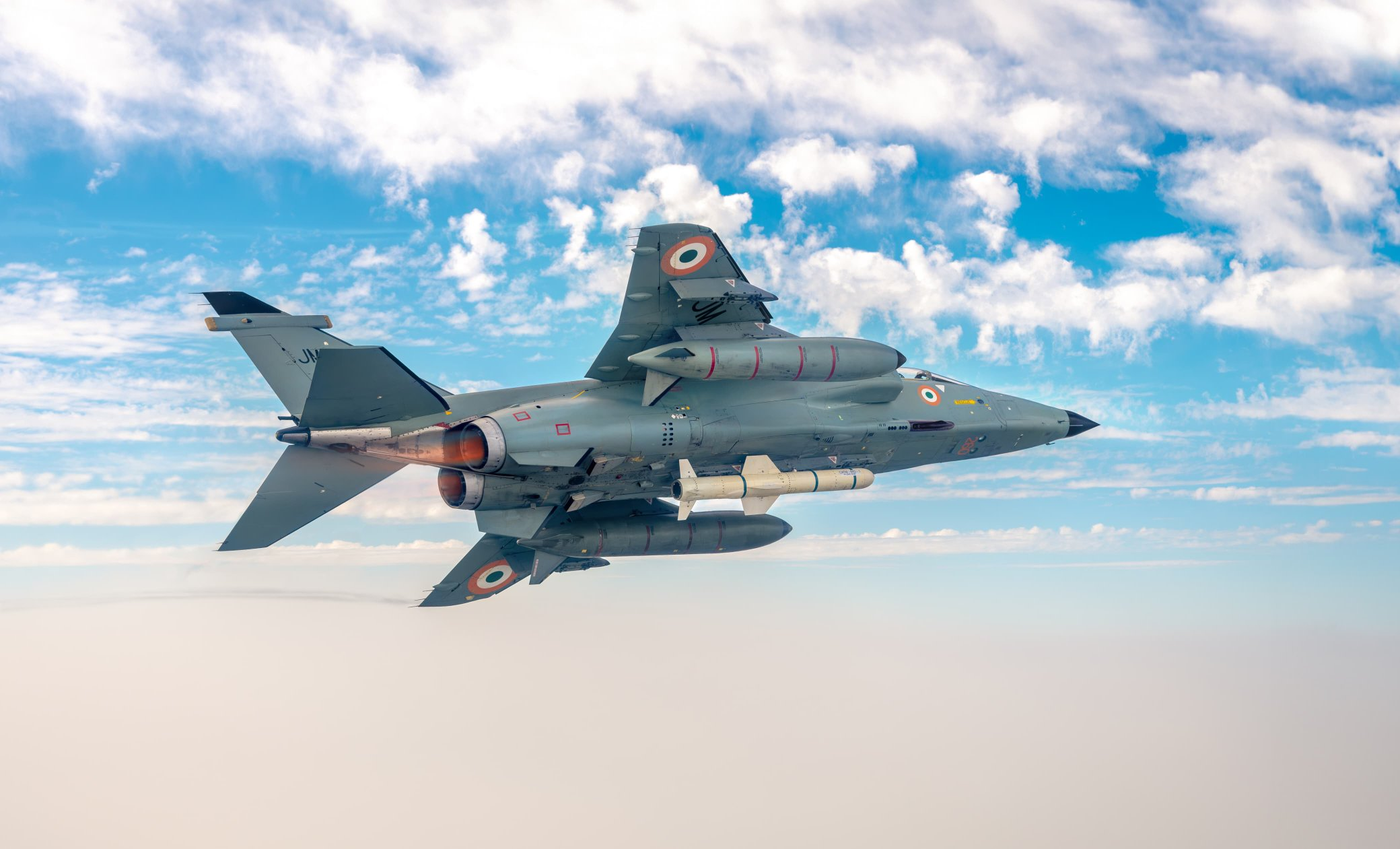
Indian fighter bombers - Sepecat Jaguar, Dassault Mirage 2000 and Sukhoi Su-30MKI along Rafale

Nuclear-armed fighter-bombers were India's first and only nuclear-capable strike force until 2003 when the country's first land-based nuclear ballistic missiles were fielded.

In addition to their ground-attack role, it is believed that the Dassault Mirage 2000s and SEPECAT Jaguars of the Indian Air Force are able to provide a secondary nuclear-strike role. The SEPECAT Jaguar was designed to be able to carry and deploy nuclear weapons and the Indian Air Force has identified the jet as being capable of delivering Indian nuclear weapons. The most likely delivery method would be the use of bombs that are free-falling and unguided.

Three airbases with four squadrons of Mirage 2000H (about 16 aircraft with 16 bombs from 1st and 7th squadrons of the 40th Wing at Maharajpur Air Force Station) and Jaguar IS/IB (about 32 aircraft with 32 bombs from one squadron each at Ambala Air Force Station and Gorakhpur Air Force Station) aircraft are believed to be assigned the nuclear strike role.

==== Land-based ballistic missiles ====
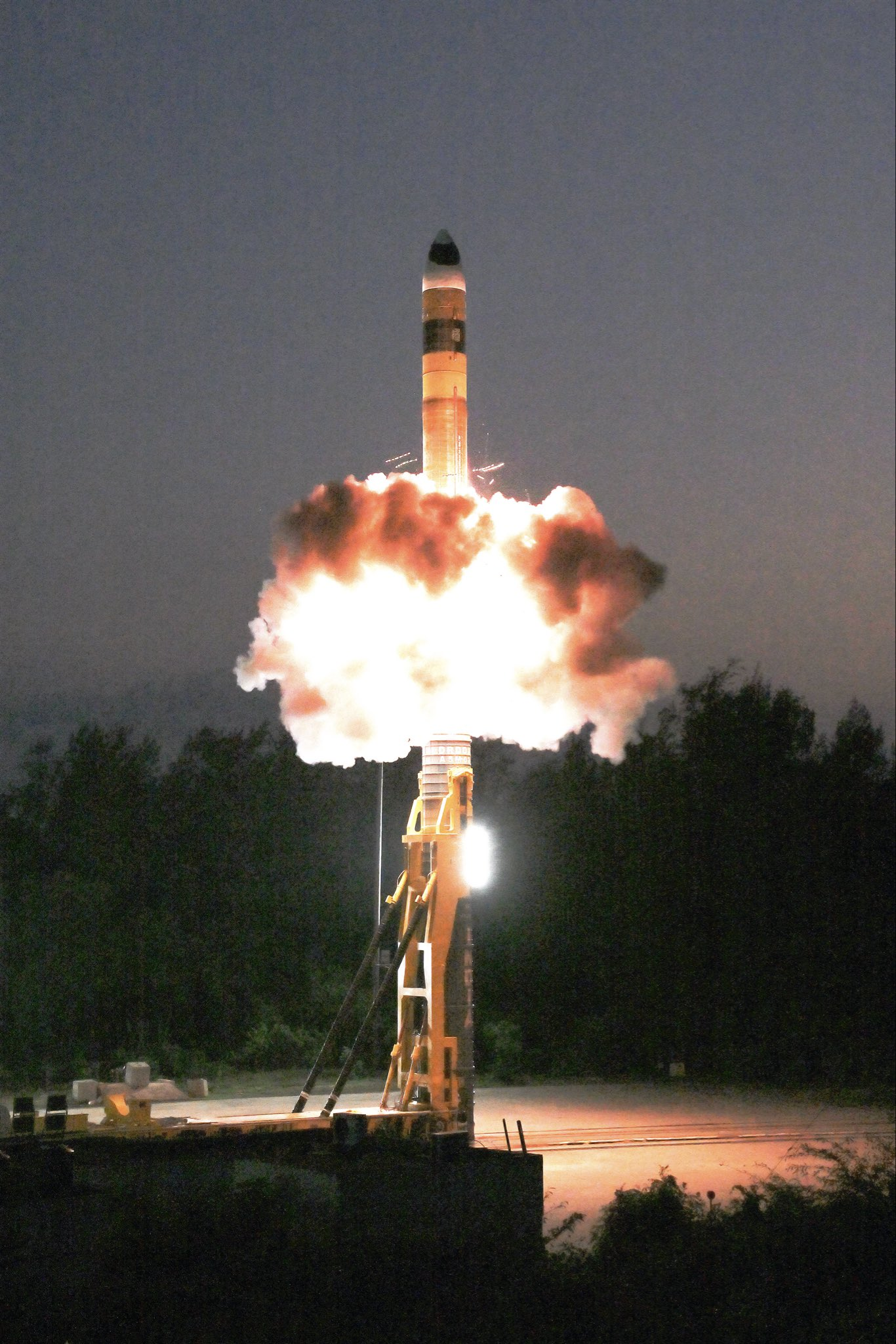
MIRV armed Agni-V ICBM undergoing test flight from its TCT-5 road mobile launcher

Nuclear MaRV capable Agni-P MRBM on cold-launching from rail mobile launcher

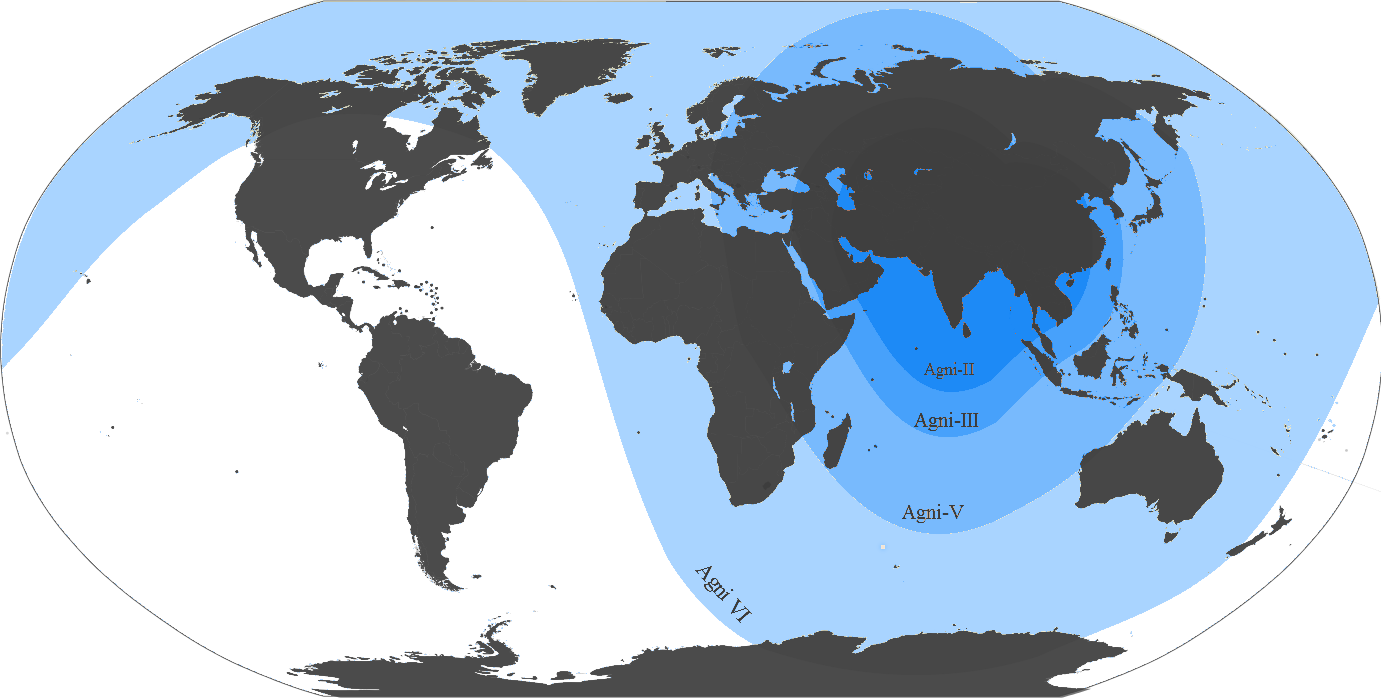
Agni missile systems - range comparison

The estimated 68 nuclear warheads of land-based nuclear weapons of India are under the control of and deployed by the Strategic Forces Command, using a variety of vehicles and launching silos. They currently consist of six different types of ballistic missiles, the Agni-I, the Agni-II, Agni-III, Agni-IV, Agni-V, Agni-P, and the Army's variant of the Prithvi missile family – the Prithvi-I. However, the Prithvi missiles are less useful for delivering nuclear weapons because they have a shorter range and must be deployed very close to the India–Pakistan border. Additional variants of the Agni missile series have recently been inducted including the most recent, the Agni-IV and the Agni-V, which is currently being deployed. Agni-VI is also under development, with an estimated range of 10,000–12,000 km and features such as Multiple independently targetable reentry vehicles (MIRVs) or Maneuverable reentry vehicles (MARVs).

Land-based ballistic missiles
Name	Type	Range (km)	Status
Prithvi-I	Short-range ballistic missile	150	Deployed
Prithvi-II	Short-range ballistic missile	250–350	Deployed
Prithvi-III	Short-range ballistic missile	350–600	Deployed
Agni-I	Medium-range ballistic missile	700	Deployed
Shaurya	Medium-range ballistic missile	700–1900	Deployed
Agni-P	Medium-range ballistic missile	1,000–2,000	Deployed
Agni-II	Medium-range ballistic missile	2,000–3,000	Deployed
Agni-III	Intermediate-range ballistic missile	3,500–5,000	Deployed
Agni-IV	Intermediate-range ballistic missile	4000	Deployed
Agni-V	Intercontinental ballistic missile	7,000–8,000	Deployed
Agni-VI	Intercontinental ballistic missile	10,000–12,000	Under development
Surya	Intercontinental ballistic missile	~16,000	Unconfirmed

==== Sea-based ballistic missiles ====
The Indian Navy has developed two sea-based delivery systems for nuclear weapons, completing Indian ambitions for a nuclear triad, which may have been deployed in 2015.

The first is a submarine-launched system consisting of at least four 6,000-tonne (nuclear-powered) ballistic missile submarines of the Arihant class. The first vessel, INS Arihant, was commissioned in August 2016. She is the first nuclear-powered submarine to be built by India. A CIA report claimed that Russia provided technological aid to the naval nuclear propulsion program. The submarines will be armed with up to 12 Sagarika (K-15) missiles armed with nuclear warheads. Sagarika is a submarine-launched ballistic missile with a range of 700 km. This missile has a length of 8.5 meters, weighs seven tonnes and can carry a pay load of up to 50 kg. Sagarika has already been test-fired from an underwater pontoon, but now DRDO is planning a full-fledged test of the missile from a submarine and for this purpose may use the services of the Russian Navy. India's DRDO is also working on a submarine-launched ballistic missile version of the Agni-III missile, known as the Agni-III SL. According to Indian defence sources, the Agni-III SL will have a range of 3,500 kilometres (2,200 mi). The new missile will complement the older and less capable Sagarika submarine-launched ballistic missiles. However, the Arihant class ballistic missile submarines will be only capable of carrying a maximum of four Agni-III SL.

Test launch footage of K-4 SLBM and the INS Arihant SSBN

The second is a ship-launched system based around the short-range ship-launched Dhanush ballistic missile (a variant of the Prithvi missile). It has a range of around 300 km. In the year 2000, the short-range missile was test-fired from INS Subhadra (a Sukanya class patrol craft). INS Subhadra was modified for the test and the missile was launched from the reinforced helicopter deck. The results were considered partially successful. In 2004, the missile was again tested from INS Subhadra and this time the results were reported successful. In December 2005 the missile was tested again, but this time from the destroyer INS Rajput. The test was a success with the missile hitting the land based target.

Sea-based ballistic missiles
Name	Type	Range (km)	Status
Dhanush	Short-range ballistic missile	350	Operational
Sagarika (K-15)	Submarine-launched ballistic missile	700	Operational
K-4	Submarine-launched ballistic missile	3,500	Operational
K-5	Submarine-launched ballistic missile	5,000-6,000	Under Development
K-6	Submarine-launched ballistic missile	8,000-10,000	Under Development

=== Question over thermonuclear capability ===
Shakti-1, India's thermonuclear test device

There is not enough public information to determine if India possesses either multiple-stage thermonuclear weapons or boosted fission weapons. On 11 May 1998, India announced that it had detonated a two-stage thermonuclear bomb with a yield of 45 kilotons in its Operation Shakti tests ("Shakti-I", specifically, in Sanskrit the word 'Shakti' means power). However, due to subsequent statements by involved scientists, the low device yield, and the nature of underground testing, it remains unclear if Shakti-I had any thermonuclear yield. Based on this, it is unclear if India weaponized two-stage thermonuclear bombs for deployment. These questions continue to affect Indian nuclear weapons policy with regard to the possibility of future testing.

==== 1998 test reactions ====
In 1998, immediately after the test, Samar Mubarakmand, a Pakistani nuclear physicist, asserted that if Shakti-I had been a thermonuclear test, the device had failed to fire. However, Harold M. Agnew, former director of the Los Alamos National Laboratory, said that India's assertion of having detonated a staged thermonuclear bomb was very much believable. Rajagopala Chidambaram, former chairman of the Atomic Energy Commission of India said that India has the capability to build thermonuclear bombs of any yield at will. The test took place two years after the 1996 opening of the Comprehensive Nuclear-Test-Ban Treaty, and following the test series India declared a voluntary testing moratorium, believed to be maintained to this day.

==== 2009 revelations ====
Following the 2005 India–United States Civil Nuclear Agreement, and the 2009 inauguration of the Obama administration, there was increased concern in the Indian nuclear weapons community that India would be pressured to sign the Comprehensive Nuclear-Test-Ban Treaty, forbidding future underground tests.

At this time, Indian nuclear physicist and weapons program coordinator Krishnamurthy Santhanam claimed that the Shakti-I test saw a fizzle in the secondary thermonuclear stage, failing to achieve fusion ignition. The Washington Post reported:

Santhanam said that the hydrogen bomb tested in 1998 "completely failed to ignite" and that the shaft, the frame and the winches were found to be intact even after the tests. No crater was formed in the fusion test. "If the second H-bomb stage of the composite device had worked, the shaft would have been blown to smithereens," he told reporters.

This statement was supported by former chairman of the Atomic Energy Commission of India, P. K. Iyengar who stated that "there is strong reason to believe the thermonuclear device had not fully burnt and, therefore, further testing was called for."

In response, physicists Chidambaram, Anil Kakodkar, and former president A. P. J. Abdul Kalam, maintained that the test was a success and India can build thermonuclear weapons of various yields up to around 200 kt (840 TJ) based on the Shakti-1 test.

In a subsequent interview, Santhanam said "I have maintained and will always maintain that the test was not more than 60 per cent successful in terms of the yield it generated. I have made this assessment based on the report of the instrumentation data that is available and also the programme coordinator." He also criticized former president Kalam's role in the Pokhran-II test series as he was "a missile scientist and he was not present there at that time".

==== Possibility of resumption of testing ====
In 2009, Iyengar and Bharat Karnad supported India maintaining its option for future nuclear testing by not joining the CTBT, in light of India potentially lacking verified thermonuclear weapons.

A Washington-based Arms Control Association spokesperson criticized Santhanam's comments as being motivated by opposition to nuclear disarmament and the opportunity for future nuclear testing, stating resumed testing would provoke resumed nuclear testing by Pakistan and even CTBT-signatory China. Testing would also end the 2005 nuclear deal with the United States, jeopardizing India's supply of low-enriched uranium for its commercial nuclear reactors.

In 2012, India began construction in Challakere of a facility related to thermonuclear weapons.

As of 2025, neither India nor Pakistan have signed the CTBT.

==== Yield ====
The yield of India's hydrogen bomb test remains highly debatable among the Indian science community and international scholars. The question of politicisation and disputes between Indian scientists further complicated the matter.

India claimed that their thermonuclear device was tested at a controlled yield of 45 kt (190 TJ) because of the proximity of the Khetolai village at about 5 kilometres (3.1 mi), to ensure that the houses in that village do not suffer significant damage. Another cited reason was that radioactivity released from yields significantly more than 45 kilotons might not have been contained fully.

In an interview in August 2009, the director for the 1998 test site preparations, K. Santhanam claimed that the yield of the thermonuclear explosion was lower than expected and that India should therefore not rush into signing the CTBT. Other Indian scientists involved in the test have disputed K. Santhanam's claim, arguing that Santhanam's claims are unscientific. British seismologist Roger Clarke argued that the magnitudes suggested a combined yield of up to 60 kilotonnes of TNT (250 TJ), consistent with the Indian announced total yield of 56 kilotonnes of TNT (230 TJ). U.S. seismologist Jack Evernden has argued that for correct estimation of yields, one should 'account properly for geological and seismological differences between test sites.

== International response ==
India is not a signatory to either the NPT or the Comprehensive Nuclear-Test-Ban Treaty (CTBT) but did accede to the Partial Nuclear Test Ban Treaty in October 1963. Journalist, conspiracy theorist, and holocaust denier Gregory Douglas claims CIA officer Robert Crowley told him in an interview in 1993 that India's pursuit of the programme disturbed the United States and that the CIA assassinated Prime Minister Shastri and Homi Bhabha in 1966. India is a member of the International Atomic Energy Agency (IAEA), and four of its 17 nuclear reactors are subject to IAEA safeguards. India announced its lack of intention to accede to the NPT as late as 1997 by voting against the paragraph of a General Assembly Resolution which urged all non-signatories of the treaty to accede to it at the earliest possible date. India voted against the UN General Assembly resolution endorsing the CTBT, which was adopted on 10 September 1996. India objected to the lack of provision for universal nuclear disarmament "within a time-bound framework." India also demanded that the treaty ban laboratory simulations. In addition, India opposed the provision in Article XIV of the CTBT that requires India's ratification for the treaty to enter into force, which India argued was a violation of its sovereign right to choose whether it would sign the treaty. In early February 1997, Foreign Minister I. K. Gujral reiterated India's opposition to the treaty, saying that "India favors any step aimed at destroying nuclear weapons, but considers that the treaty in its current form is not comprehensive and bans only certain types of tests."

In August 2008, the International Atomic Energy Agency (IAEA) approved a safeguards agreement with India under which the former will gradually gain access to India's civilian nuclear reactors. In September 2008, the Nuclear Suppliers Group granted India a waiver to access civilian nuclear technology and fuel from other countries. The implementation of this waiver makes India the only known country with nuclear weapons which is not a party to the NPT but is still allowed to carry out nuclear commerce with the rest of the world.

Since the implementation of the NSG waiver, India has signed nuclear deals with several countries including France, United States, Mongolia, Namibia, Kazakhstan and Australia while the framework for similar deals with Canada and the United Kingdom are also being prepared.

=== Nuclear proliferation ===
With the establishment of the Atomic Energy Establishment, Trombay, now known as Bhabha Atomic Research Centre (BARC), India built its first research reactor, Apsara– a 1 megawatt (0.0010 GW) – with the assistance greatly provided by the United Kingdom and France. During the 1950s, India began to negotiate with the United States, the United Kingdom, France, and Canada on technical information on reactor theory and design. After lengthy negotiations with Canada, India successfully acquired the 40 megawatts (0.040 GW) Cirus nuclear reactor, which became a watershed event in nuclear proliferation. It was the refined plutonium from Cirus that was used in India's first nuclear test in 1974.

The Russian Federation has wide range of commercial, financial, and defence interests with India and its nuclear programme since the times of the former Soviet Union. After the Soviet split from China in 1960, the former Soviet Union fostered close ties with India as a counterweight to China and began training Indian nuclear scientists on fuel cycle and reactor technology. While India's interactions with the western firms were limited due to concerns of nuclear proliferation, the Soviet Union transferred much of the technical specifications on the Soviet nuclear fuel cycle technology and earlier designs of Russian nuclear reactors, and provided the commodities, knowledge on the heavy water production, and further technical support to Indian nuclear programme after India faced sanctions and global isolation after the nuclear test in 1974.

Between 1961 and 1981, Soviet technical assistance to India was crucial in advancing the Indian nuclear programme especially in acquiring the indigenous capability to produce its own uranium fuel, construction of CANDU-type pressurized heavy water reactors with Russian scientists, and supplying the heavy water moderator. Although, the Soviet leadership knew of India's determination to acquire nuclear weapons and initially insisted that India sign the Non-Proliferation Treaty, they did not press the issue, concluding that it was futile and would damage relations with India.

India began its missile development programme in 1979 with two separate classified projects (codenamed: Devil and Valiant) both intended to reverse engineer a Soviet missile, S-75 Dvina, which India first acquired in 1965. When those efforts failed, the Indian government decided to established its own missile programme in 1983, based largely on publicly available information on Soviet rocketry. The Indian engineers skillfully mastered the spaceflight lessons learnt from the Soviet space programme that greatly helped India's dual space and military missile programme.

In 1983–84, the Indian government used the Alfred Hempel network to advance its continuing efforts in attaining the heavy water production technologies and it was reported that the India was one of the largest beneficiaries (and fourth member) of the Tinner–Khan network that allowed India to enriched uranium through the gas centrifuges method in 1990s. In 1978, Libya reached out to India in a view of learning Indian nuclear technology when its relations were cooled with Pakistan, which India was receptive in a broader view of expanding its foreign outreach to Africa. However, India rebuffed Libya's further requests, citing lack of manpower and institutional infrastructure.

In 2004, U.S. relations with India began to warm when Bush administration reached a civil nuclear agreement with India that opened opportunity to expand nuclear commerce with members of the Nuclear Suppliers Group to expand its nuclear power generation despite not being a party to the NPT.

In 2026, Canada revised its policy towards India when both nation reached a "nuclear agreement" relating the export of uranium.

== Domestic legislation ==
India has several laws in whole or partial measure that deal with the regulation of weapons of mass destruction. They include the Weapons of Mass Destruction and their Delivery Systems (Prohibition of Unlawful Activities) Act of 2005. In April 2022 a bill was tabled to amend the 2005 act to include the financing of proliferation.

== See also ==
Weapons of mass destruction

- India–United States Civil Nuclear Agreement
- Weapons of mass destruction
- Nuclear Command Authority (India)

Defense-related

- Indian military satellites
- Guided missiles of India
- Indian Armed Forces
- Indian Human Spaceflight Programme

== Sources ==
- Kumar, A. V. (1 May 2010), "Reforming the NPT to Include India", Bulletin of the Atomic Scientists, archived from the original on 7 April 2014
- Nair, V. K. (2007), "No More Ambiguity: India's Nuclear Policy" (PDF), afsa.org, archived from the original (PDF) on 27 September 2007
- Pandit, Rajat (27 July 2009), "N-Submarine to Give India Crucial Third Leg of Nuke Triad", The Times of India, archived from the original on 11 August 2011
