= KALI (electron accelerator) =

Indian research project

The KALI (Kilo Ampere Linear Injector) is a linear electron accelerator being developed in India by the Defence Research and Development Organisation (DRDO) and the Bhabha Atomic Research Centre (BARC). BARC scientists have said it could potentially be used as a directed-energy weapon.

== Overview ==
The KALI is a particle accelerator that emits pulses of electrons. Later stages of the machine convert the electron energy into electromagnetic radiation, which can be set to X-ray or microwave frequencies.

In that role, a high-power microwave version could destroy incoming missiles and aircraft through soft kill, by damaging their electronic circuitry.

== History ==
The project was founded by P. H. Ron and proposed in 1985 by R. Chidambaram, then Director of BARC. Work began in 1989 at the Accelerators & Pulse Power Division of BARC. DRDO is also involved. The machine was developed for industrial applications first, and its defence uses emerged later.

The earliest machines had an electron beam power of about 0.4 GW, and later versions raised it. The series consists of the KALI 80, KALI 200, KALI 1000 and KALI 5000.

The KALI-5000 was commissioned in late 2004.

== Applications ==
The Terminal Ballistics Research Laboratory (TBRL) in Chandigarh uses the X-rays as an illuminator for ultrahigh-speed photography in ballistics research. The microwave emissions are used for electromagnetic research.

DRDO scientists have used the microwave-producing version to test the vulnerability of the electronic systems of the Light Combat Aircraft (LCA), then under development.

The machine has also helped in designing electrostatic shields that protect the LCA and missiles against hostile microwave attack, and that protect satellites against electromagnetic impulses (EMI) from nuclear weapons and other cosmic disturbances, which can destroy electronic circuits. Electronic components used in missiles can withstand fields of about 300 V/cm, while EMI can produce fields of thousands of V/cm.

== See also ==
- Defence industry of India
- DRDO Smart Anti-Airfield Weapon
- Indian Space Research Organisation
- Guided missiles of India
- India and weapons of mass destruction
- Indian Ballistic Missile Defence Programme
