= Surya missile =

Intercontinental ballistic missile allegedly under development

Surya ICBM
- Type: Intercontinental ballistic missile
- Place of origin: India

Service history
- Used by: Indian Armed Forces

Production history
- Designer: Defence Research and Development Organisation
- Manufacturer: Bharat Dynamics Limited

Specifications
- Mass: ~70,000 kg
- Warhead: 3-15MIRV warheads with yield 750kt or 5 Mt single warhead
- Blast yield: 750KT to 5MT
- Engine: Two-stage solid rocket + third stage solid/liquid rocket
- Propellant: Solid and liquid fuel
- Operational range: ~12,000-18,000 km
- Maximum speed: Mach 27 (33,100 km/h)
- Launch platform: TEL, Missile launch facility

The Surya missile (lit. 'Sun') is a speculated intercontinental ballistic missile being developed by Defence research and development organization of India. Its operational range is beyond 18,000 Km, covering the entire earth.

== History ==
According to a 1995 report published in The Nonproliferation Review, Surya (meaning the Sun in Sanskrit and many Indian languages) is the codename for one of the Intercontinental ballistic missiles that India is reported to be developing, for which there is no formal statement from India. The DRDO is believed to have begun the project in 1994. This report was not confirmed by any other sources until 2010.

According to the report, the Surya is an intercontinental-range, surface-based, solid and liquid propellant ballistic missile. The report adds that Surya is the most ambitious project in India's Integrated Guided Missile Development Programme. The Surya missile is more strategic in nature due to its capabilities and thus gives enemy mutually assured destruction. The Surya is speculated to have a range of more than 12,000 kilometres, which brings almost all major nations of the world in its range.

It is said to have a three-stage design with the first two stages using solid propellants and the third-stage using liquid. The first stage is speculated to be borrowed from the first stage of ISRO's Polar Satellite Launch Vehicle (S139 booster).

=== Development ===
According to a 2013 report by The New Indian Express, Surya missile is speculated of being built highly confidentially under the code-name of Agni-VI.

== Speculated specifications ==
- Class:ICBM
- Lasing: Surface based, underwater based (in certain strategic areas) and submarine based is its most important aspect which may range above 16,000 km.
- Length: 40.00 m.
- Diameter: 1.1m.
- Launch Weight: 70,000 kg.
- Propulsion: First/second stage solid, third liquid.
- Warhead Capabilities: 3-10 thermonuclear warheads of 750 kilotons each or 4-5 Megatons single warhead.
- Status: Confidential.
- Number Built: Confidential.
- In Service: unknown.

== See also ==
- Project Valiant
- Intercontinental ballistic missile
- Agni Missile System
- Polar Satellite Launch Vehicle
