= SAMAR Air Defence System =

Indian surface to air missile series

- Type: Surface-to-air missile
- Place of origin: India

Service history
- In service: 2022
- Used by: Indian Air force
- Wars: India-Pakistan Conflict 2025

Production history
- Designer: 11 Base Repair Depot Ojhar with industry partner Adtech Inventions Pvt Ltd 7 Base Repair Depot Tughlakabad with industry partner Simran Flowtech Industries and Yamazuki Denki
- Variants: SAMAR I : Vympel R-73; SAMAR II : Vympel R-27

Specifications
- Detonation mechanism: Proximity fuze, contact fuze
- Engine: Solid-propellant rocket
- Propellant: Solid fuel
- Operational range: SAMAR I : 10–12 km (6.2–7.5 mi); SAMAR II : 20 km (12 mi)
- Maximum speed: SAMAR I : Mach 2 to 2.5; SAMAR II : Mach 4.5
- Guidance system: SAMAR I : Infrared homing; SAMAR II : Semi-active radar homing, infrared homing
- Launch platform: SAMAR I : Ashok Leyland Stallion; SAMAR II : BEML-Tatra T815 8WD

The Surface to Air Missile for Assured Retaliation, or SAMAR is a short range, quick reaction surface-to-air missile system. The Indian Air Force Maintenance Command's 11 Base Repair Depot Ojhar in collaboration with Adtech Inventions Pvt Ltd and 7 Base Repair Depot Tughlakabad (BRD) in collaboration with Simran Flowtech Industries and Yamazuki Denki; these Indian private sector companies designed and developed the SAMAR-1 system.

The SAMAR employs Vympel R-73 and Vympel R-27 air-to-air missiles, which are of Russian origin.

Using reconditioned infrared homing Vympel R-73E, semi-active radar homing Vympel R-27 R1/ER-1, and infrared homing Vympel R-27 ET-1 variant of air-to-air missiles (AAMs) that have been further reprogrammed to be utilized as a short range, surface to air defense platform, Indian Air Force Base Repair Depot created the SAMAR system.

Following extensive test firing, the SAMAR system made its debut at Aero India 2023. The SAMAR-1 system has 12-kilometer range which allows it to take on low-flying aerial targets like fighter planes, helicopters, and unmanned aerial vehicles (UAVs).

The Indian Air Force has assigned the project to Maintenance Command for a road mobile short-range air defence system using thousands of Vympel R-73 and Vympel R-27 missiles that have reached the end of their flight shelf life and are no longer suitable for use from fighter jets.

== Trials ==
On Aero India 2023, IAF confirmed that SAMAR-1 system completed 17 rounds of test firing before entering initial production.

On 17 December 2023, IAF successfully test fired SAMAR in Exercise AstraShakti from Air Force Station Suryalanka. It achieved the firing objectives in different engagement scenarios. SAMAR is a twin-turret rail launch platform which can launch two missiles in single or salvo mode. The missile operates in Mach 2 to 2.5 range.

SAMAR air defence missile system was fired at the Exercise Vayushakti on 17 February 2024.

In August 2024, reports confirmed that the SAMAR-2 variant (30 km range) is ready to be tested from December 2024. This was announced during Exercise Tarang Shakti where the SAMAR 1 system was showcased.

== Manufacturing ==
During Aero India 2023, Indian Air Force confirmed that SAMAR system development is complete and the weapon platform has entered the initial phase of manufacturing. Five production batches of SAMAR-1 are ready to be delivered to IAF's Air-Defence Missile Unit.

As of 2023-24, three SAMAR-1 system have been inducted in IAF field units.

== Concerns ==
Retired Indian Air Force pilot Squadron Leader Vijainder Thakur, a SEPECAT Jaguar pilot, questioned the efficacy of the arrangement, citing chiefly the lack of Vympel R-27 production in India. In addition, he also questioned its operational viability given its compromised combat capability and thought it was a waste of IAF funds. With experience of flying Mikoyan-Gurevich MiG-21s, Group Captain TP Srivastava emphasized the value of ground radar in determining the capability of surface-to-air missile (SAM) systems.

Having prior experience in English Electric Canberra bombers and Mikoyan-Gurevich MiG-25, Group Captain Johnson Chacko concluded that converting air-to-air missiles into surface-to-air missiles was not unfeasible, pointing to the jointly developed Norwegian/US NASAMS system as long as viable guidance system and acquisition issues were resolved.

Eventually, the SAMAR system will be used to eliminate a bigger stockpile of older, Soviet era air-to-air missiles in the Indian Air Force inventory in addition to taking down low-altitude targets.

== Operational Use ==
During Operation Sindoor (May 7, 2025), a retaliatory strike against 21 terrorist camps in Pakistan and PoK following the Pahalgam attack, SAMAR was pivotal in defending Indian airspace. Pakistan’s counterattacks involved drones and missiles targeting cities like Jammu, Srinagar, and Amritsar. SAMAR effectively intercepted these low-altitude threats, preventing damage to military and civilian infrastructure. Its quick deployment and combat-proven reliability, validated in exercises like AstraShakti (2023) and VayuShakti (2024), ensured seamless integration into India’s layered defence grid. Despite concerns over missile availability and guidance limitations, SAMAR’s performance in this war-like scenario underscored its cost-effective, indigenous design, reinforcing India’s ability to counter dynamic aerial threats and bolstering national defence sovereignty.

== See also ==
- NASAMS – (Norway, United States)
- SPYDER – (Israel)
