= INS Subhadra =

Indian Navy Sukanya class patrol vessel

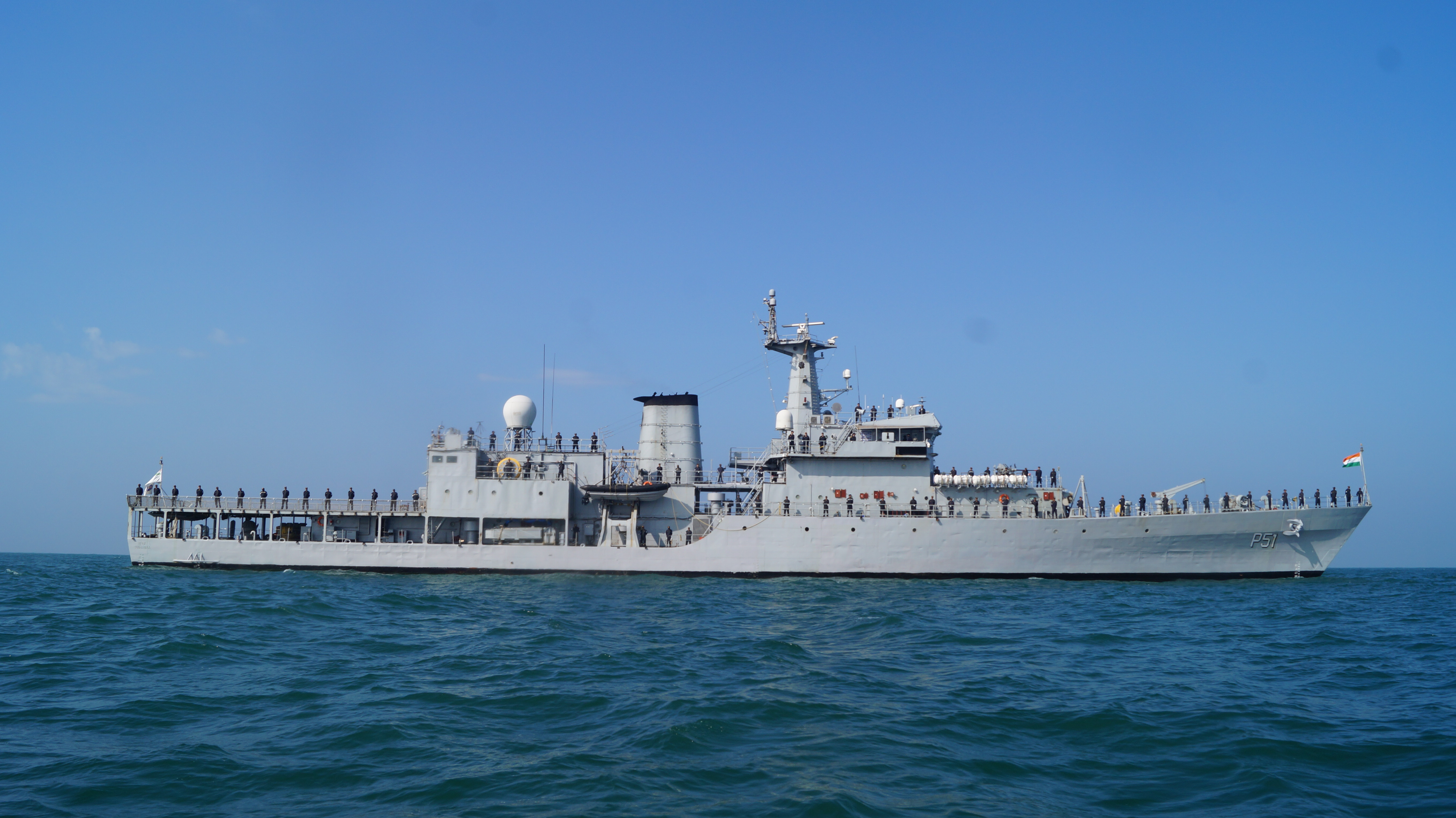

History
- Name: INS Subhadra
- Namesake: Subhadra
- Laid down: 30 Oct 1987
- Launched: 17 Nov 1988
- Commissioned: 25 January 1990
- Status: Active

General characteristics
- Class & type: Sukanya class patrol vessel
- Displacement: 2,045 tons (full load)
- Length: 101.95 metres
- Beam: 11.5 metres
- Propulsion: 2 × diesel engines, 16PA6V280 SEMT Pielstick, 12,800 bhp (9,540 kW), 2 shafts
- Speed: 21 knots (39 km/h)
- Range: 7,000 nautical miles (13,000 km) at 15 knots (28 km/h)
- Complement: 107 (Incl 08 Officers)
- Sensors & processing systems: 03 Vision Master Navigation Radar
- Armament: 1 × 40 mm, 60-cal Bofors anti-aircraft gun; 2 × 12.7 mm machine guns; LORA COMS; 2 x SRCG; P51 added: 1 Dhanush ballistic missile; P55 added: 2 x 25 mm, 80-cal anti-aircraft guns
- Aircraft carried: 1 HAL Chetak

INS Subhadra (P51) is a Sukanya class patrol vessel of the Indian Navy. Since her commissioning, she has been under the operational command of Flag Officer Commanding Western Fleet (India) (FOCWF). The ship has changed its base port to Karwar, Karnataka in Mar 2012 from Mumbai. During the operational service, the ship has evolved in two major roles – Strategic and Conventional.

== Service history ==
=== Operation Sankalp ===
INS Subhadra played a crucial role in the rescue of 17 sailors from the former-MV Ruen as she, along with INS Kolkata, P-8I Neptune patrol aircraft, SeaGuardian drones and MARCOS Commandos air-dropped from an IAF C-17 Globemaster III .The ship managed to capture 35 pirates in a mammoth 40 hour operation about 700 miles from Indian Coastlines.
