= Agni-VI =

Proposed Indian ICBM

- Type: ICBM
- Place of origin: India

Service history
- In service: Under development
- Used by: Indian Armed Forces

Production history
- Designer: Defence Research and Development Organisation
- Manufacturer: Bharat Dynamics Limited

Specifications
- Mass: 55,000 - 70,000 kg
- Length: 20 - 40.00 m
- Diameter: 2 m
- Warhead: Strategic nuclear weapon with 10-11 MIRV capability
- Warhead weight: 3 tonnes
- Engine: Four stage rocket + MaRV
- Propellant: Solid
- Operational range: 10,000–12,000 kilometres (6,214–7,456 mi)
- Maximum speed: Mach 24 (29,400 km/h; 18,300 mph; 8.17 km/s)
- Transport: Road mobile

Agni-VI (Sanskrit: अग्नि; IAST: Agni; lit. Fire) is an MIRV-capable intercontinental ballistic missile under development by the Defence Research and Development Organisation (DRDO) for the Strategic Forces Command (SFC) of the Indian Armed Forces.

== Background ==
India's credible minimum deterrence envisaged a nuclear triad of counter-strike capability which required a long-range missile to provide robust second strike capability. The Agni-VI missile is being developed as a successor to the Agni-V and as a precuursor to the Surya missile.

== History ==
=== Preliminary research ===
A report from Centre for Land Warfare Studies published in 2011 suggested that New Delhi had not considered the need for an ICBM, despite India not being bound by any treaty commitments to refrain from developing ICBM capability. It also said that DRDO is constrained by the requirement to obtain government's permission before starting the development of an ICBM.

In June 2011, for the first time then IAF Chief Marshal Pradeep Vasant Naik vehemently argued in favour of broadening India's nuclear strike capabilities beyond the immediate neighbourhood. Naik, who was also the head of the Chiefs of Staff committee, stated, "India should pursue an ICBM programme to acquire ranges of 10,000 km or more. Breaking out of the regional context is important as the country's sphere of influence grows. We have no territorial designs on any country, but India needs the capability to match its sphere of influence."

In October 2011, The Pioneer published a report questioning DRDO's ability to independently develop seeker technology (guidance technology) suitable for ICBMs, that could enable the missile to traverse long distances in excess of 10,000 km. The same report also asserted Russia's willingness to help India with seeker technology. The authenticity of the pioneer report is disputed by at least one foreign newspaper, with the counter-claim that the involvement of Russia is probably inflated out of proportion, because if the report about Russian involvement is true, Russia may be suspected of violating the Missile Technology Control Regime. In response to the scepticism, a top DRDO scientist asserted that India has all the equipment and technology needed to develop ICBMs, "but where the warhead should go or what the range should be will have to be a political call."

On 20 June 2011, Indian Defence News published an article titled India Serious About 10,000 km ICBM which stated that India is seriously contemplating to enhance the reach of its strategic missiles and that the Ministry of Defense is considering a DRDO proposal to develop intercontinental ballistic missile (ICBM) capable of hitting targets 10,000 km away. Building an ICBM has international ramifications and the ultimate decision to go ahead with the proposal would be taken by the Cabinet Committee on Security (CCS).

In April 2012, after the successful launch of Agni V, V.K. Saraswat revealed that India had no plans to cap the Agni program and that there will be more missiles in the future. In January 2013, DRDO chief V.K. Saraswat said that after the development of Agni V, DRDO will develop Agni VI which will have Multiple Independently Targetable Re-entry Vehicle (MIRV) capability. He said that the missile design has been completed and DRDO is in the hardware realisation phase.

=== Recent developments ===
In May 2018, reports confirmed the development of another ICBM in the Agni series, a three-stage Agni VI missile. It was proposed that the missile will be developed in 2024 or so and will have an even longer range, up to 8,000 km to 12,000 km. The Agni VI will be sleeker than the Agni-V and capable of carrying at least 10 nuclear warheads, capable of targeting multiple targets at the same time.

As per people related to Agni VI development, government officials carefully watched 2022 Russian invasion of Ukraine and how ICBM played its role in geopolitics. It is speculated that India might go ahead with a technology demonstrator by 2025 in order to validate computer simulations aiming to reach even the farthest corner of China from a safer survival distance. The Agni VI programme is already on track and DRDO is simultaneously working on SLBM variant.

A DRDO scientist from Pune, Pradeep Kurulkar, was honey trapped by a Pakistani agent, for the first time publicly revealed the details concerning Agni-VI launcher's development in 2023.

On 30th April 2026, DRDO chairman Samir V Kamat said that the organisation remains fully prepared to proceed for full scale development of the Agni-VI missile pending on government approval for the effort.

== Missile Description ==
Agni-VI will be a four-stage intercontinental ballistic missile, which is in the hardware development phase, after its design phase was completed. Agni-VI is expected to have Multiple independently targetable reentry vehicle as well as Maneuverable reentry vehicle (MaRV). And these maneuverable warheads will give Agni VI an extended range exact figure of which is currently classified. It will be taller than its predecessor Agni-V, and was expected to be flight tested by 2017. The government of India is yet to approve the project, although DRDO has completed all calculations and started the engineering work.

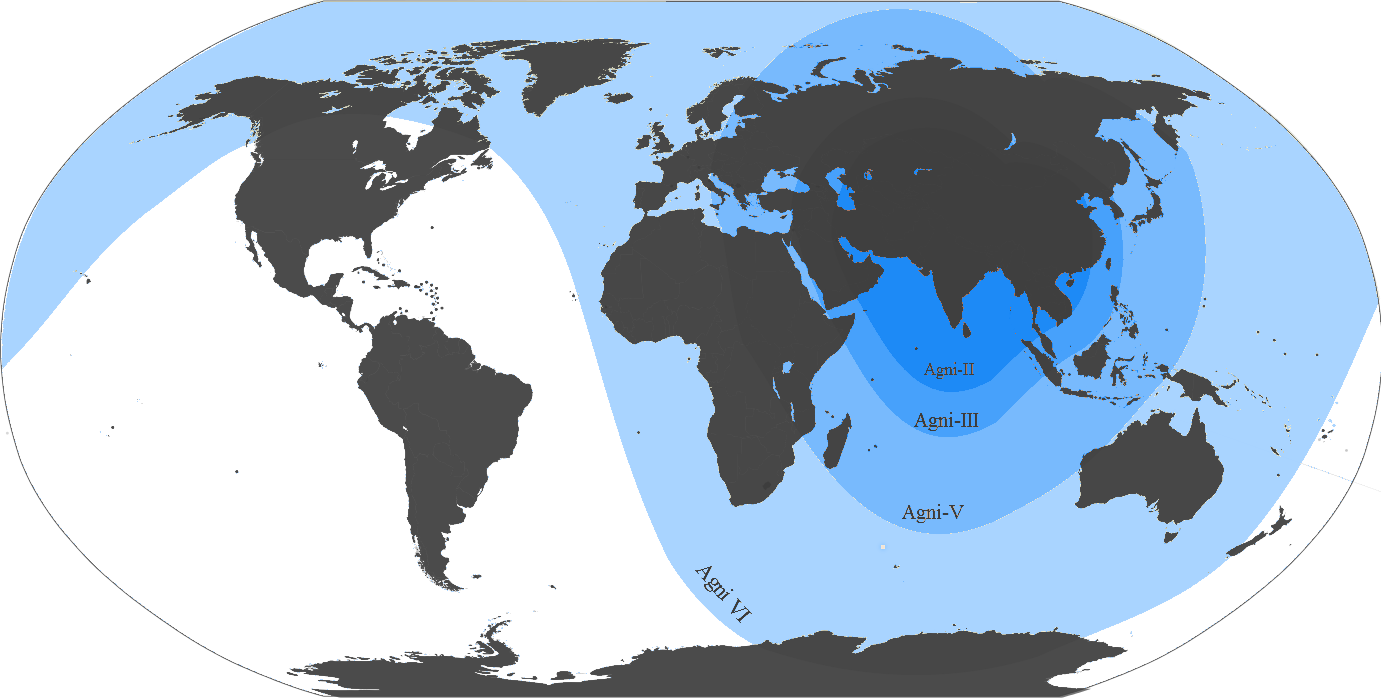
Estimated range of Agni-VI ICBM and its predecessors

It is reported to be the latest and most advanced version among the Agni missiles. According to sources, Agni-VI missile is likely to carry up to 10 MIRV warheads and will have a strike range of 12,000 km, though DRDO has refused to confirm the missile's range. A senior DRDO scientist was quoted as saying that the new generation Agni-VI missile will be sleeker, easily transportable and would be readily deployed. It will have the capability to be launched from submarine and from land-based launchers.

One of the project's goals is to make sure Agni-VI can avoid missile defense systems like China's HQ-19, the United States' THAAD, and Russia's S-500 by employing MaRVs, decoys, and radar-absorbent coatings. Additionally, the project intends to use composite materials to make the missile lighter than the Agni-V. The missile design was finished in 2025, and it will employ the technologies developed for the K-5 and K-6 SLBMs.

== See also ==
- India and weapons of mass destruction
- Surya missile

Related development

- Agni I
- Agni II
- Agni III
- Agni IV
- Agni V
- Agni-P
- K Series missiles

Related lists

- List of nuclear weapons
- List of states with nuclear weapons
