= Agni-IV =

Indian intermediate-range ballistic missile

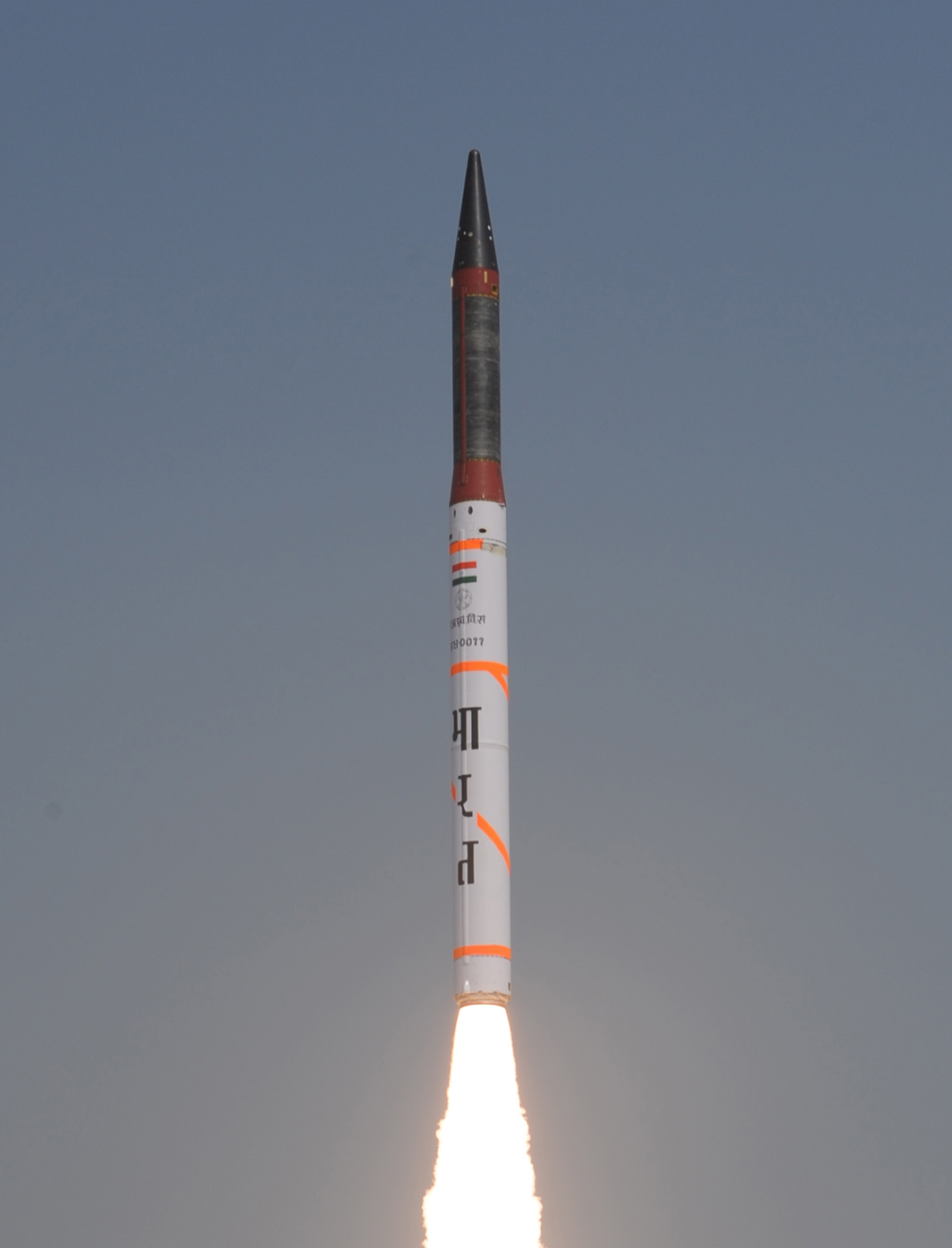
- Agni-IV missile being launched from Wheeler Island, Odisha.
- Type: Intermediate Range Ballistic Missile
- Place of origin: India

Service history
- In service: Active
- Used by: Strategic Forces Command

Production history
- Designer: Defence Research and Development Organisation
- Manufacturer: Bharat Dynamics Limited

Specifications
- Mass: 17,000 kilograms (37,000 lb)
- Length: 20 metres (66 ft)
- Warhead: Conventional, thermobaric, strategic nuclear weapon
- Warhead weight: 800 kg
- Engine: Multi-stage composite rocket motor
- Propellant: Solid fuel
- Operational range: 4,000 km
- Flight altitude: 900 kilometres (560 mi)
- Guidance system: RLG-INS + redundant micro-INS and digital control
- Accuracy: <100 m CEP
- Launch platform: 8 × 8 transporter erector launcher/Rail Mobile Launcher

Range comparison of Agni missiles

Agni-IV (lit. 'Fire') is the fourth in the Agni series of missiles which was earlier known as Agni II prime. It has been developed by India's DRDO and displayed a number of new technologies and significant improvement in missile technology. The missile is light-weight and has two stages of solid propulsion and a payload with re-entry heat shield. With 4,000 km range, it is capable of striking targets in nearly all of mainland China, if launched from northeastern part of India.

== Development ==
This missile is one of a kind, proving many new technologies for the first time, and represents a significant leap in India's missile technology. The missile is lighter in weight and uses a two-stage rocket engine powered by solid propellant. The Composite Rocket Motor which has been used for the first time has given excellent performance. The missile system is equipped with modern and compact avionics with redundancy to provide a high level of reliability. The indigenous-built ring laser gyroscope is used in the high accuracy with Micro Inertial Navigation System (MINGS), which complement each other as a redundancy. The high performance onboard computer with distributed Avionics architecture, high speed reliable communication bus and a full Digital Control System have controlled and guided the missile to the target. The missile reached the target with a high level of accuracy. Radars and electro-optical systems along the Coast of Odisha have tracked and monitored all the parameters of the missile. Two Indian Naval ships located near the target witnessed the final event.

Dr Vijay Kumar Saraswat, Scientific Advisor to Raksha Mantri, Secretary, Department of Defence R&D and Director General DRDO, who witnessed the launch, congratulated all the scientists and employees of DRDO and the Armed Forces for the successful launch of AGNI-IV. Sri Avinash Chander, Chief Controller (Missiles & Strategic Systems), DRDO and Programme Director of AGNI, while addressing the scientists after the launch, called it as a new era in the modern Long Range Navigation System in India. He said, "this test has paved the way ahead for the success of Agni-V Mission, which will be launched shortly".

Project Director of Agni-IV, Tessy Thomas with her team prepared and integrated the missile system and launched the missile successfully. According to her, DRDO has produced and proven many new state of the art technologies in the Missile System like Composite Rocket Motors, very high accuracy Ring Laser Gyro based Inertial Navigation System, Micro Navigation System, Digital Controller System and very powerful onboard computer system. The missile, having capability to carry strategic nuclear warheads for the forces, has provided a fantastic deterrence to the country and it will be produced in numbers and delivered to the Armed Forces as early as possible. Sri S.K. Ray, Director RCI, Sri P. Venugopalan, Director DRDL, Dr V.G. Sekaran Director ASL and Sri S.P. Dash, Director ITR were also present during the launch and reviewed all the activities.

The DRDO had produced and proven many new state of the art technologies with the Agni-IV like composite rocket motors, very high accuracy Ring Laser Gyro based Inertial Navigation System, Micro Navigation System, Digital Controller System and very powerful onboard computer system. Agni-IV bridges the gap between Agni-II and Agni-III. Agni IV can carry a warhead of 1 tonne. It is designed to increase the kill efficiency along with a higher range performance. Its length is 20 meters and launch weight 17 tonnes. It can be fired from a road mobile launcher. Efforts are being made to fine-tune the Agni missiles to defeat anti-ballistic missile systems. The radar cross-section and other detectable signatures of Agni-IV have been significantly reduced to make them much more immune to counter-measures.

== Testing ==
Date/Time (IST)	Operator	Launch Site	Outcome
Date/Time (IST)	Operator	Payload	Function
Date/Time (IST)	Remarks		
15 November 2011: 0900 IST	DRDO	ITR	Success
15 November 2011: 0900 IST	DRDO	Inert warhead	Success
15 November 2011: 0900 IST	Agni-IV was successfully test fired for the first time, from a road-mobile launcher at 9 am from Wheeler Island off the coast of Orissa. The missile followed its trajectory, attained a height of about 900 km and reached the pre-designated target in international waters of the Bay of Bengal. All mission objectives were fully met. All systems functioned perfectly till the end encountering re-entry temperatures of more than 3,000 °C (5,430 °F).		
19 September 2012 1148 IST	DRDO	ITR	Success
19 September 2012 1148 IST	DRDO	Live warhead	Success
19 September 2012 1148 IST	The missile was successfully test-fired again for its full range of 4,000 km from the Wheeler Island, off the Orissa coast. The missile lifted off from a road mobile launcher and after zooming to an altitude of over 800 km, it re-entered the atmosphere and impacted near the pre-designated target in the Indian Ocean with remarkable degree of accuracy following a 20-minute flight. Carrying a payload of explosives weighing a tonne, the missile re-entered the atmosphere and withstood searing temperatures of more than 3,000 °C (5,430 °F).		
20 January 2014	DRDO	ITR launch complex 4	Success
20 January 2014	DRDO	Inert warhead	Success
20 January 2014	The missile was test-fired in the actual weapon and road-mobile configuration of the Strategic Forces Command (SFC).The missile traveled a vertical distance of 850 km and covered its full range of 4,000 km. The onboard ring laser gyro-based inertial navigation system (RINS) and the micro-navigation system (MINGS) enabled the missile to fall within 100 meters of its target. The re-entry shield withstood outside temperatures as high as 4,000 °C (7,230 °F), enabling the avionics to work at less than 50 °C (122 °F) inside.		
2 December 2014	SFC	ITR	Success
2 December 2014	SFC	Inert warhead	Success
2 December 2014	The missile was successfully test-fired by the Strategic Forces Command (SFC). This was the first user trial and fourth consecutive successful flight. The missile has been inducted into the Indian Army following this trian.		
9 November 2015	SFC	ITR	Success
9 November 2015	SFC	Inert warhead	Success
9 November 2015	Agni IV was successfully test-fired as part of a user trial by the tri-Service Strategic Forces Command (SFC). According to DRDO officials, the missile met all mission parameters.		
2 January 2017 1155 IST	SFC	ITR launch complex 4	Success
2 January 2017 1155 IST	SFC	Inert warhead	Success
2 January 2017 1155 IST	Agni IV was successfully test-fired as part of a user trial by the Strategic Forces Command (SFC) at 11:55 am from launch complex-4 of the Integrated Test Range (ITR) at Wheeler Island. According to DRDO officials, the user trial met all mission objectives.		
23 December 2018 0835 IST	DRDO	ITR launch complex 4	Success
23 December 2018 0835 IST	DRDO	-	Success
23 December 2018 0835 IST	The Agni IV was successfully test fired from Launch Complex-4 of the Integrated Test Range (ITR) at Abdul Kalam Island at around 8:35 am.		
6 June 2022 1930 IST	SFC	ITR launch complex	Success
6 June 2022 1930 IST	SFC	Inert warhead	Success
6 June 2022 1930 IST	A successful training launch of an Intermediate-Range Ballistic Missile Agni-IV was carried out at approximately 19.30 pm hours on 6 June from APJ Abdul Kalam Island, Odisha .		
6 September 2024	SFC	ITR	Success
6 September 2024	SFC	-	Success
6 September 2024	Successful launch was carried out from the Integrated Test Range in Chandipur, Odisha. The test was conducted by Strategic Forces Command.		
6 August 2026:	SFC	ITR	Success
6 August 2026:	SFC	-	Success
6 August 2026:	Successful missile readiness firing from the Integrated Test Range. The test was conducted by Strategic Forces Command.		

== See also ==
- India and weapons of mass destruction
- DF-26

Related development

- Agni I
- Agni II
- Agni III
- Agni V
- Agni-P
- Agni VI

Related lists

- List of nuclear weapons
- List of states with nuclear weapons
