= Air Force Area (Gorakhpur) =

Air Force Area Gorakhpur Nandanagar; Rajhi; Akash Vihar; Pawan Vihar; Sainik Vihar; Sainik Kunj; Kusmhi
- New Gorakhpur city
- Air Force Area
- Location in Gorakhpur Uttar Pradesh, India
- Coordinates: 26°45′07″N 83°27′05″E
- Country: India
- State: Uttar Pradesh

Area
  - Total: 2,551 km^{2} (985 sq mi)

Population (2011)
  - Total: 20,558
  - Rank: 8th
  - Density: 8.059/km^{2} (20.87/sq mi)

Languages
  - Official: Hindi
- Time zone: UTC+5:30 (IST)
- Postal code: 273002
- Website: Administrated by https://gorakhpur.nic.in

Air Force Area is an area in Gorakhpur in the Indian state of Uttar Pradesh. It is spread over a large area including Kushmi Jungle, Forest Club, and Vinod Van Zoo, located near Gorakhpur Airport. The Air Force Area has a one-passenger railway station, the Kushmi railway station. The Area has another local railway station; called Gorakhpur Cantt (Chawani) which is the passageway to the Main Railway Station of Gorakhpur Junction

== Demographics ==
As of the 2001 India census, Air Force Area had a population of 9,593. Males constituted 55% of the population and females 45%. The literacy rate of 76% is higher than the national average of 59.5%; with 60% of the males and 40% of females literate. 13% of the population was under 6 years of age.
