= Project Devil =

Indian surface-to-surface missile project

Project Devil was one of two early liquid-fueled missile projects developed by India, along with Project Valiant, in the 1970s. The goal of Project Devil was to produce a short-range surface-to-surface missile. Although discontinued in 1980 without achieving full success, Project Devil led to the later development of the Prithvi missile in the 1980s.

== Development ==
Both projects were overseen by the Defense Research & Development Laboratory (DRDL) of India, which had begun in 1958 with a specialization in anti-tank missiles but expanded in subsequent years. Project Devil was intended to be a short-range surface-to-air missile utilizing 3-ton engines. The model for Project Devil was the SA-2 Guideline, a Soviet Union missile which the DRDL intended to reverse engineer.

Project Devil was officially launched under V.S. Narayanan, who became director of the DRDL in January 1972. In June 1972, DRDL received ₹160 million (equivalent to ₹7.2 billion or US$85 million in 2023) to fund both Project Devil and Project Valiant, though it came with a veil of secrecy; the Union Cabinet had publicly declined the funding request, but Prime Minister Indira Gandhi had granted it secretly through her discretionary powers. In turn, DRDL took pains to disguise the purpose of the funds so that their real work would not be immediately apparent. Project Devil specifically was given a budget of ₹50 million (equivalent to ₹2.2 billion or US$27 million in 2023) to use within a three-year period. DLDR spent nearly half of the budget on importing equipment and supplies; it also subcontracted some of its labor, hiring the Hindustan Aeronautics Limited and Bharat Heavy Electricals Limited to cast a 350 kg magnesium liquid-fuel engine frame and a solid-booster rocket respectively. DRDL also began to expand rapidly, increasing its workforce from 400 to 2,500 people in a two-year period in an effort to meet staffing needs of both the projects.

However, internal disputes soon disrupted the DRDL, as the leader of the Valiant project believed Narayanan was disproportionately invested in Project Devil, and external interest in both programs waned, particularly as the SA-2 model for the Devil project had not performed well in combat. In 1974, Project Valiant was terminated and Devil re-conceived as a project to gather information on technology rather than an effort to produce an actual missile. In January 1975, the Indian Space Research Organisation was appointed to run an external review of Project Devil and in March 1975 found it had been successful in several areas, if not in liquid propulsion, and should be permitted to continue. It ran for several more years before being completely discontinued in 1980, by which point DRDL had produced several components for Devil, including two solid rocket boosters with high-strength steel casings and a specific impulse of 200 seconds, and a second stage three-ton liquid-propellant engine fueled by G-fuel (a combination of Xylidiene and Tri-ethylamine), oxidized by red fuming nitric acid. Narayanan, who disagreed with the decision, resigned his post at DRDL and was replaced by S. L. Bansal. Devil components were subsequently modified and utilized as components in other systems.

== Aftermath ==
According to a 2006 article by Praful Bidwai in The Daily Star, Project Valiant "totally failed", while its sister project was a partial success. Though neither reached fruition, the projects were important precursors to the Prithvi missile developed in the 1980s.

== See also ==
- IGMDP
- Project Valiant
