= Prithvi (missile) =

Indian series of short-range missiles

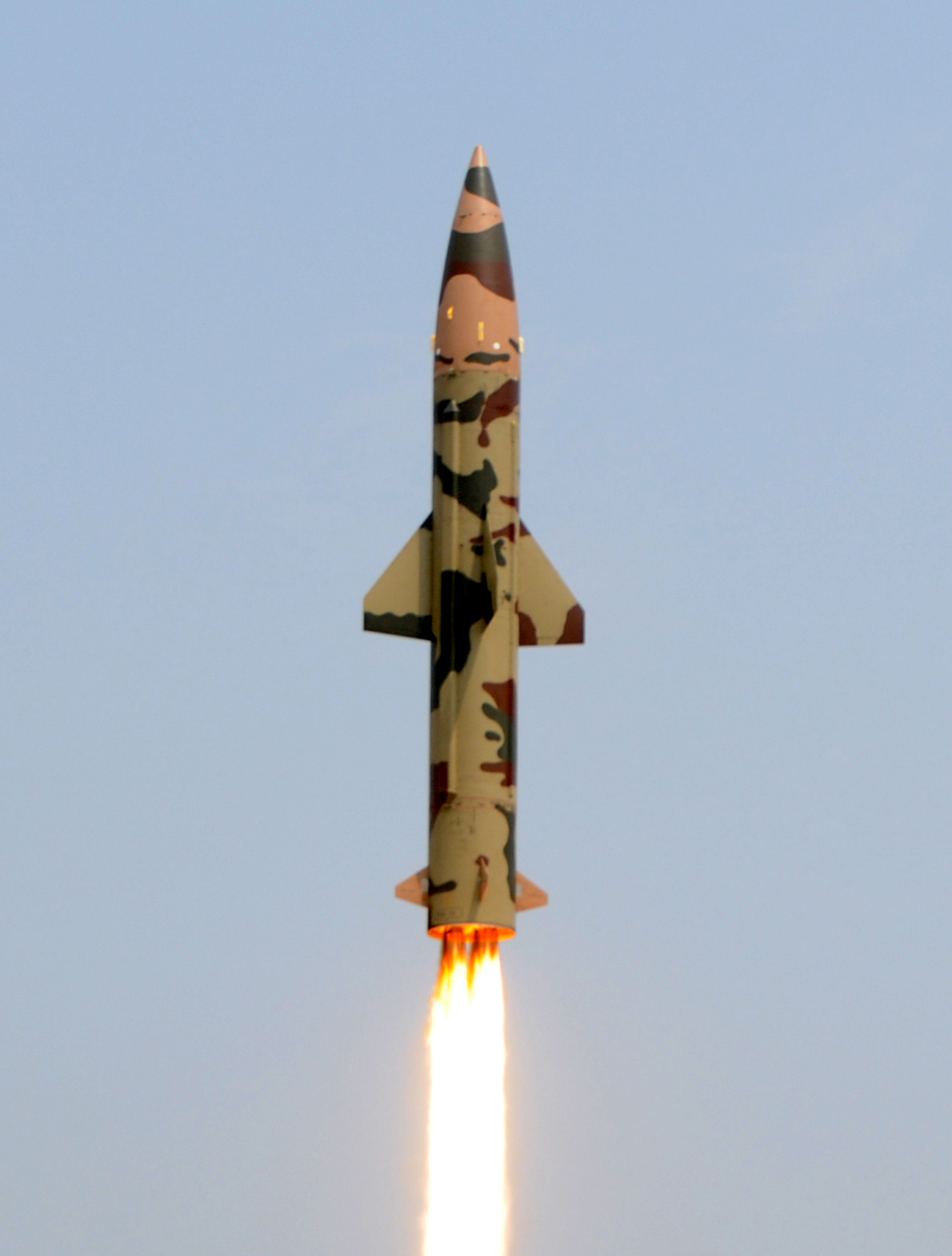
- Prithvi II missile during a launch
- Type: Short-range ballistic missile
- Place of origin: India

Service history
- In service: 1994 (Prithvi I)
- Used by: Strategic Forces Command

Production history
- Designer: Defence Research and Development Organisation
- Manufacturer: Bharat Dynamics Limited
- Produced: 25 February 1988 (Prithvi I); 27 January 1996 (Prithvi II); 23 January 2004 (Prithvi III)
- No. built: 30 (2017 est.)

Specifications
- Mass: 4,400 kg (Prithvi I); 4,600 kg (Prithvi II); 5,600 kg (Prithvi III)
- Length: 9 m (Prithvi I); 8.56 m (Prithvi II, Prithvi III)
- Diameter: 110 cm (Prithvi I, Prithvi II); 100 cm (Prithvi III)
- Warhead: High explosives, penetration, cluster munition, fragmentation, thermobaric, chemical weapon and tactical nuclear weapon
- Warhead weight: 500 kg (1,100 lb) - 1,000 kg (2,200 lb)
- Engine: Single-stage liquid rocket (Prithvi I, Prithvi II), Two-stage solid rocket (Prithvi III)
- Propellant: Liquid fuel (Prithvi I, Prithvi II), Solid fuel (Prithvi III)
- Operational range: 150 km (Prithvi I); 250–350 km (Prithvi II); 350–750 km (Prithvi III)
- Guidance system: Strap-down INS
- Accuracy: 50 m CEP (Prithvi I, Prithvi II) <10 m CEP (Prithvi II upgrade); 25 m CEP (Prithvi III)
- Launch platform: 8 x 8 Tata transporter erector launcher

Prithvi (lit. 'Earth') is a tactical surface-to-surface short-range ballistic missile (SRBM) developed by the Defence Research and Development Organisation (DRDO) of India under the Integrated Guided Missile Development Program (IGMDP). It is deployed by India's Strategic Forces Command.

== Development and history ==
The Government of India launched the Integrated Guided Missile Development Program in 1983 to achieve self-sufficiency in the development and production of wide range of ballistic missiles, surface-to-air missiles etc. Prithvi was the first missile to be developed under the program. DRDO attempted to build a surface-to-air missile under Project Devil. Variants make use of either liquid or both liquid and solid fuels. Developed as a battlefield missile, it could carry a nuclear warhead in its role as a tactical nuclear weapon.

The aerodynamic characterization research was conducted at the National Aerospace Laboratories' 1.2m Trisonic Wind Tunnel Facility.

=== Variants ===
The Prithvi missile project encompassed developing three variants for use by the Indian Army, Indian Air Force and the Indian Navy. The initial project framework of the Integrated Guided Missile Development Program outlines the variants in the following manner.

- Prithvi I (SS-150) – Army version (150 km (93 mi) range with a payload of 1,000 kg (2,200 lb))
- Prithvi II (SS-250) – Air Force version (350 km (220 mi) range with a payload of 500 kg (1,100 lb))
- Prithvi III (SS-350) – Naval version (350 km (220 mi) range with a payload of 1,000 kg (2,200 lb))

== Description ==
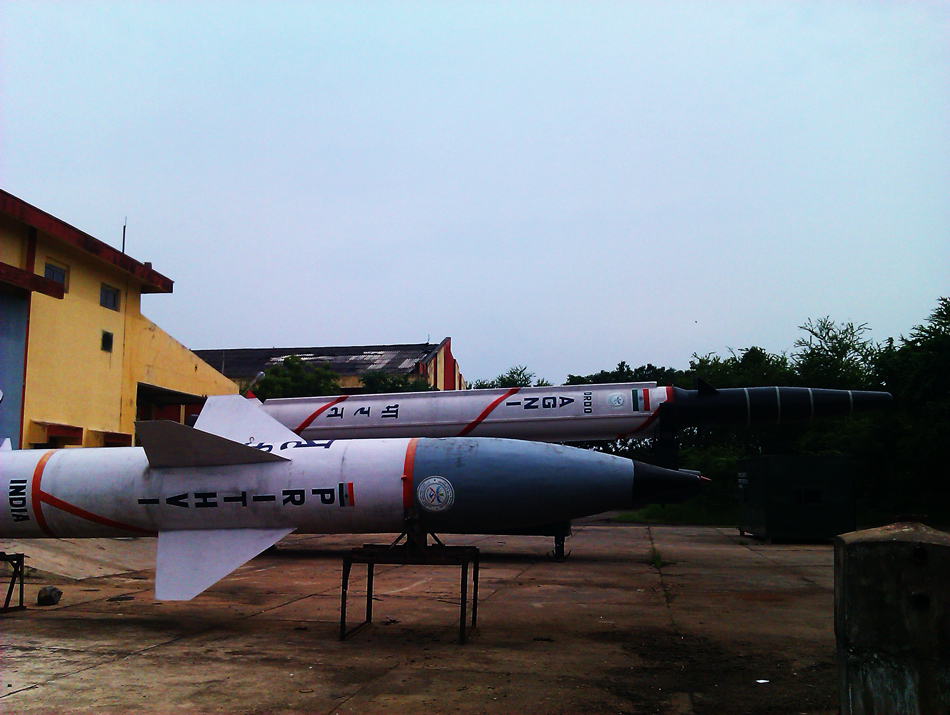
Agni and Prithvi missile models in DRDO, Balasore

=== Prithvi I ===
Prithvi I is a single-stage liquid-fuelled surface-to-surface ballistic missile having a maximum warhead mounting capability of 1,000 kg, with a range of 150 km (93 mi). It has an accuracy of 10–50 m (33–164 ft) and can be launched from transporter erector launchers. This class of Prithvi missile was inducted into the Indian Army in 1994. As per DRDO's former chief Avinash Chander, the tactical 150 km-range Prithvi missile will be replaced with the Prahaar missile, which is more capable and has more accuracy. According to Chander, the Prithvi I missiles withdrawn from service would be upgraded to be used for longer ranges.

As per reports, in the 1990s, 75 missiles were initially ordered and the order was subsequently increased. The missiles are generally paired with conventional warheads but can be equipped with nuclear warheads as well. In June 1997, the United States reported that a battalion of 12 Prithvi missiles had been forward deployed to bases near the Indo-Pakistani border. The units under the Regiment of Artillery, that are equipped with these missiles includes

1. 222 Missile Group
2. 333 Missile Group (Secunderabad under XI Corps)
3. 444 Missile Group
4. 555 Missile Group

=== Prithvi II ===
Prithvi II is a single-stage liquid-fuelled missile. Initially, it was developed for an extended range of 250 km (160 mi) and maximum warhead capacity of 500 kg. This was gradually enhanced to a range of 350 km (220 mi) and 500–1000 kg payload. It was developed with the Indian Air Force being the primary user.

It was first test-fired on 27 January 1996 and the developmental trials were completed in 2004. In a test, the missile was launched with an extended range of 350 km (220 mi) and had improved navigation due to an improvement in inertial navigation system. The missile features measures to deceive anti-ballistic missiles.

The missile was inducted into India's Strategic Forces Command in 2003. After a failed test on 24 September 2010, two more missiles aimed at two different targets were launched on 22 December 2010 and were successful. According to reports, the range has been increased to 350 km (220 mi) and the payload capacity now ranges between 500 – 1000 kg. On 2 June, India successfully test-fired another Prithvi-II missile from the Integrated Test Range at Chandipur, Odisha at 9:50 am.

On 20 November 2019, Strategic Forces Command carried out 2 night user trials of Prithvi-II missiles as part of its annual training cycle to test the combat readiness of its missile forces. Two Prithvi-II tactical surface-to-surface short-range ballistic missiles were test fired from the Integrated Test Range (ITR) on Abdul Kalam Island in the Bay of Bengal off the coast of Odisha, according to government sources cited in local media reports. The trial of the surface-to-surface missile with a strike range of 350 km was carried out from a mobile launcher from Launch Complex III of the ITR between 7:00 pm and 7:15 pm.

On 4 December 2019, another night trial was conducted off Odisha coast at 07:48 pm from Launch Complex III of Integrated Test Range in Chandipur. The Strategic Forces Command conducted night trial of Prithvi II in full operational configuration from Launch Complex III of Integrated Test Range on 23 September 2020.

On 17 July 2025, India successfully test-fired the Prithvi-II short-range ballistic missile from the Integrated Test Range (ITR) at Chandipur, Odisha, as part of a routine user training launch. The test was conducted alongside the Agni-I missile under the aegis of the Strategic Forces Command (SFC).

Test log of Prithvi II
Test type	Date	Operator	Status	Notes
Developmental Trial	27 January 1996	DRDO	Success	
User Trial/Training	12 October 2009 (I)	Strategic Forces Command	Success	
User Trial/Training	12 October 2009 (II)	Strategic Forces Command	Success	
User Trial/Training	24 September 2010	Strategic Forces Command	Failure	
User Trial/Training	22 December 2010 (I)	Strategic Forces Command	Success	
User Trial/Training	22 December 2010 (II)	Strategic Forces Command	Success	
User Trial/Training	9 June 2011	Strategic Forces Command	Success	
User Trial/Training	25 August 2012	Strategic Forces Command	Success	
User Trial/Training	4 October 2012	Strategic Forces Command	Success	
User Trial/Training	7 October 2013	Strategic Forces Command	Success	
User Trial/Training	7 January 2014	Strategic Forces Command	Success	
User Trial/Training	28 March 2014	Strategic Forces Command	Success	
User Trial/Training	26 November 2015	Strategic Forces Command	Success	
User Trial/Training	16 February 2016	Strategic Forces Command	Success	
User Trial/Training	18 May 2016	Strategic Forces Command	Success	
User Trial/Training	21 November 2016 (I)	Strategic Forces Command	Success	
User Trial/Training	21 November 2016 (II)	Strategic Forces Command	Success	
User Trial/Training	2 June 2017	Strategic Forces Command	Success	
User Trial/Training	7 February 2018	Strategic Forces Command	Success	
User Trial/Training	21 February 2018	Strategic Forces Command	Success	
Night trail/Training	21 November 2019 (I)	Strategic Forces Command	Success	
Night trail/Training	21 November 2019 (II)	Strategic Forces Command	Success	
Night trail/Training	4 December 2019	Strategic Forces Command	Success	
Night trail/Training	23 September 2020	Strategic Forces Command	Success	
Night trail/Training	16 October 2020	Strategic Forces Command	Success	
Night trail/Training	16 November 2021	Strategic Forces Command	Success	
Night trail/Training	15 June 2022	Strategic Forces Command	Success	
Night trail/Training	10 January 2023	Strategic Forces Command	Success	
Night trail/Training	22 August 2024 (7:46 pm)	Strategic Forces Command	Success	
17 July 2025	17 July 2025	Strategic Forces Command	Success	Integrated Test Range (ITR)

=== Prithvi III ===
Prithvi III is a two-stage surface-to-surface missile. The first stage is solid fueled with a 16 metric ton force (157 kN) thrust motor. The second stage is liquid-fuelled. The missile can carry a 1,000 kg warhead to a distance of 350 km (220 mi) and a 500 kg warhead to a distance of 600 km (370 mi) and a 250 kg warhead up to a distance of 750 km (470 mi).

Prithvi III was first tested in 2000 from INS Subhadra, a Sukanya-class patrol vessel. The missile was launched from the updated reinforced helicopter deck of the vessel. The first flight test of the 250 km (160 mi) variant was only partially successful. The full operational testing was completed in 2004.

== Dhanush (missile) ==
Dhanush
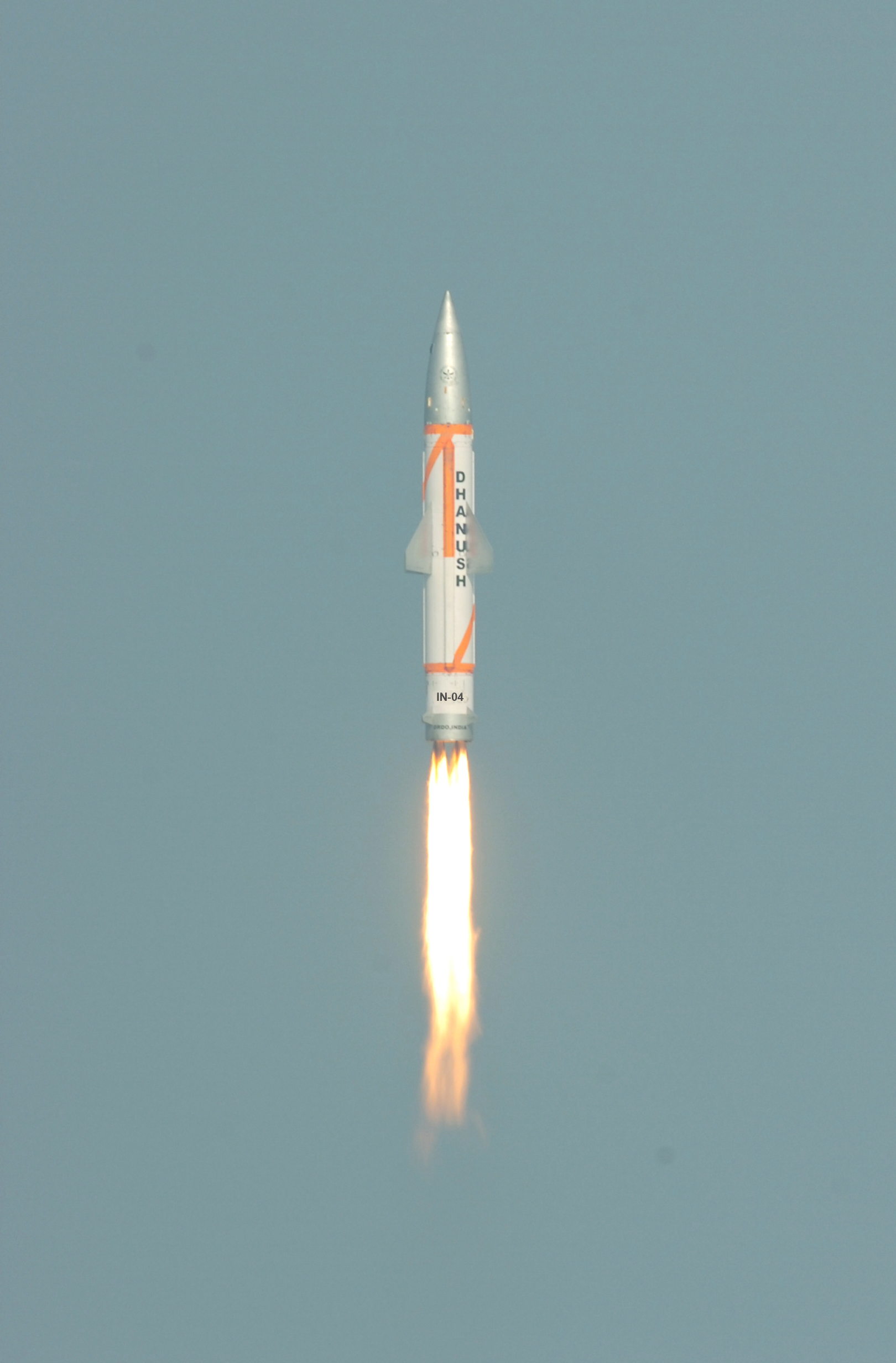
- Dhanush missile during a launch
- Type: Short-range ballistic missile / anti-ship ballistic missile
- Place of origin: India

Service history
- Used by: Indian Navy

Production history
- Designer: Defence Research and Development Organisation
- Manufacturer: Bharat Dynamics Limited

Specifications
- Mass: 4,500 kg
- Length: 8.53m
- Diameter: 0.9m
- Warhead: Conventional (blast, fragmentation, thermobaric) and tactical nuclear weapon
- Operational range: 350 km with 1000 kg warhead.; 600 km with 500 kg warhead.; 750 km with 250 kg warhead.

Dhanush (lit. 'Bow') is a variant of the surface-to-surface or ship-to-ship Prithvi III missile for the Indian Navy. It is capable of carrying both conventional as well as nuclear warheads with pay-load capacity of 500 kg-1000 kg and can strike targets in the maximum range of 750 km (470 mi). Dhanush is a system consisting of a stabilization platform and the missile. It is a customized version of the Prithvi and is certified for sea worthiness. Dhanush has to be launched from a hydraulically stabilized launch pad. Its low range acts against it and thus it is seen as a weapon either to be used to destroy an aircraft carrier or an enemy port. The Dhanush missile can be used as an anti-ship weapon as well as for destroying land targets depending on the range. The missile has been tested from surface ships of the navy multiple times.

The Indian Navy has deployed the missile system onboard two offshore patrol vessels, INS Subhadra and INS Suvarna. However, reports in 2024 indicated that the launcher systemshave been removed simultaneous with India's expanding ballistic missile submarine fleet of the Arihant class and stengthening of the seal leg of India's nuclear triad. The last confirmed report of the missile system being operational was in 2019. One of the ships, Suvarna, was disarmed off the system by December 2021. The other vessel, Shubhadra, was being equipped with a new aft deck by October 2022.

=== Trial history ===
A new variant of the Prithvi-III missile, named Dhanush, was test fired from the Rajput in March 2007 and successfully hit a land-based target.

The missile was successfully tested-fired from INS Subhadra, which was anchored about 35 km (22 mi) offshore from the Integrated Test Range at Chandipur on 13 December 2009. It was the sixth test of the missile.

The missile was test-fired successfully on 5 October 2012, on 23 November 2013, 9 April 2015, and 24 November 2015 from INS Subhadra in the Bay of Bengal off the Odisha coast.

Dhanush was again tested on 26 November 2015 from INS Subhadra in the Bay of Bengal.

A successful user trial was conducted from a naval ship on 23 February 2018 by the Strategic Forces Command off the Odisha coast.

== See also ==
=== Other Indian missile projects ===
- Project Devil
- SS-45 Missile
- Project Valiant
- Indian Ballistic Missile Defence Programme
- K Missile family

=== Comparable missiles ===
- Ghaznavi – (Pakistan)
- Abdali-I – (Pakistan)
- Shaheen-I – (Pakistan)
- J-600T Yıldırım – (Turkey)
- Fateh-313 – (Iran)
- Qiam 1 – (Iran)
- B-611 – (China)
- DF-11 – (China)
- al-Husayn – (Iraq)
- Burkan-1 – (Yemen)
- Sky Spear – (Taiwan)
