= Project Valiant =

Cancelled Indian ballistic missile project

Project Valiant was one of two early liquid-fueled missile projects developed by India, along with Project Devil in the 1970s. The goal of Project Valiant was to produce an intercontinental ballistic missile. Although discontinued in 1974 without achieving success, Project Valiant, like Project Devil, led to the later development of the Prithvi missile in the 1980s.

== Development ==
Both projects were overseen by the Defense Research & Development Laboratory (DRDL) of India, which had begun in 1958 with a specialization in anti-tank missiles but expanded in subsequent years. Project Valiant was intended to be an intercontinental ballistic missile utilizing 30-ton engines to achieve a range variously reported as 1,500 kilometres (930 mi) and 8,000 kilometres (5,000 mi). The secret project was initially funded with a few hundred thousand rupees after the presentation of a feasibility report in April 1971, but in June 1972, DRDL received 160 million rupees to fund both projects. The money came with a veil of secrecy; the Union Cabinet had publicly declined the funding request, but Prime Minister Indira Gandhi had granted it secretly through her discretionary powers. In turn, DRDL took pains to disguise the purpose of the funds so that their real work would not be immediately apparent. That year, the DRDL began to expand rapidly, increasing its workforce from 400 to 2,500 people over a two-year period in an effort to meet staffing needs of both the Valiant and Devil projects.

The Valiant missile was anticipated to weigh 85 tons and to use three liquid fuel stages. In 1972, the lab began to work on designing and developing various components for the Valiant, and the project reached the phase of ground testing on 10 May 1974. However, internal disputes disrupted the DRDL, as the leader of the Valiant project believed the DRDL's director was disproportionately invested in Project Devil, and external interest in both programs waned. That same year, the Union Cabinet asked the director of the DRDL to evaluate whether civilian uses could be found at the Indian Space Research Organization (ISRO) for Valiant's liquid-fuel engine. The ISRO declined, and since the Valiant project was not progressing satisfactorily and it was not well-managed, the project was terminated.

== Aftermath ==
According to a 2006 article by Praful Bidwai in The Daily Star, Project Valiant "totally failed", while its sister project was a partial success. Though neither reached fruition, the projects were important precursors to the Prithvi missile developed in the 1980s.

== See also ==
- SS-45 Missile
