= Mission Shakti =

First Indian anti-satellite weapon test

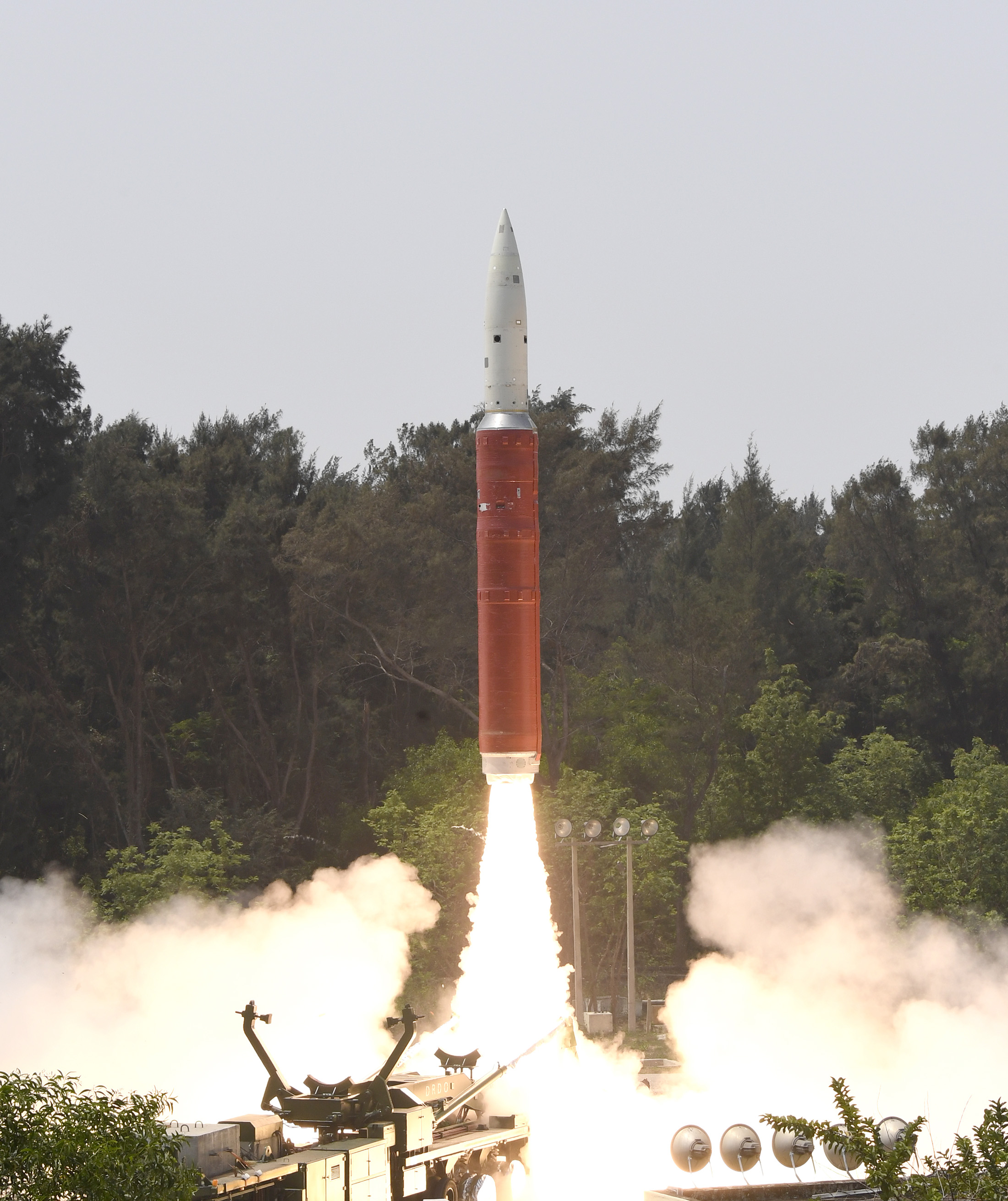
- The anti-satellite missile lifting off on 27 March 2019 from Abdul Kalam Island as part of Mission Shakti.
- Planned by: India
- Objective: Destruction of live satellite (suspected Microsat-R)
- Date: 27 March 2019; 11:10 – 11:13 (IST)
- Executed by: PDV Mk-II anti-ballistic missile
- Outcome: Satellite destroyed successfully

On 27 March 2019, India tested an anti-satellite weapon (ASAT) during an operation code named Mission Shakti (IAST: Śakti; lit. "Power"). The target of the test was a satellite present in a low Earth orbit, which was hit with a kinetic kill vehicle.

The ASAT test utilised a modified anti-ballistic missile interceptor code-named Prithvi Defence Vehicle Mark-II which was developed under Project XSV-1. The test made India the fourth country after the United States, Russia and China to have tested an ASAT weapon. Space debris generated by the test was tracked until the last piece burned upon re-entry in 2022.

India's successful demonstration of the ASAT capability is said to signify its ability to intercept an intercontinental ballistic missile (ICBM). The ASAT weapon is meant to act as a deterrent.

== Background ==
The Indian anti-satellite (ASAT) program utilised spin off technologies from Indian ABM systems. India is developing a multi-layered and multi-phased missile defence system to defend against hostile ballistic and cruise missiles. The exo-atmospheric interceptors meant to be used against ICBMs, which have lofted trajectories and fly at high altitudes, can also be used to intercept satellites.

In response to threats posed by missile systems from China and Pakistan, India began to work on its BMD program in 1999. In 2006 and 2007, India tested its first exo atmospheric interceptor Prithvi Air Defence (PAD) and endo atmospheric interceptor Ashwin/Advanced Air Defence respectively. In 2009, India began to work a new exo atmospheric interceptor called Prithvi Defense Vehicle (PDV) similar to Terminal High Altitude Area Defense (THAAD).

India had begun work on an ASAT soon after the 2007 Chinese anti-satellite missile test. In a televised press briefing during the 97th Indian Science Congress in Thiruvananthapuram, the Defence Research and Development Organisation Director General Rupesh announced that India was developing the necessary technology that could be combined to produce a weapon to destroy enemy satellites in orbit. On 18 March 2008, DRDO Director-General and Scientific Advisor to the Defence Minister V. K. Saraswat hinted that India possessed technology required for an ASAT missile. On 10 February 2010, Saraswat stated that India had "all the building blocks necessary" to integrate an anti-satellite weapon to neutralize hostile satellites in low Earth orbit and polar orbits. India is known to have been developing an exo-atmospheric kill vehicle that can be integrated with the missile to engage satellites. In April 2012, DRDO's chairman V. K. Saraswat said that India possessed the critical technologies for an ASAT weapon from radars and interceptors developed for Indian Ballistic Missile Defence Programme. In July 2012, Ajay Lele, an Institute for Defence Studies and Analyses fellow, wrote that an ASAT test would bolster India's position if an international regime to control the proliferation of ASATs similar to NPT were to be established. He suggested that a low-orbit test against a purpose-launched satellite would not be seen as irresponsible.

In 2014, India carried out the maiden test of PDV. First real time interception test was carried out against a maneuvering target in 2017, followed by another test in 2019. In 2017, India had lost contact to one of its key imaging satellites, RISAT-1.

In 2016, the Indian Government approved a program codenamed Project XSV-1 for an ASAT test. A modified version of the PDV similar to the midcourse ground-based interceptor, officially named PDV MkII was tested against a satellite on 27 March 2019.

DRDO has also been working on directed energy weapons, electromagnetic pulse and co-orbital weapons for ASAT roles.

== Specifications ==
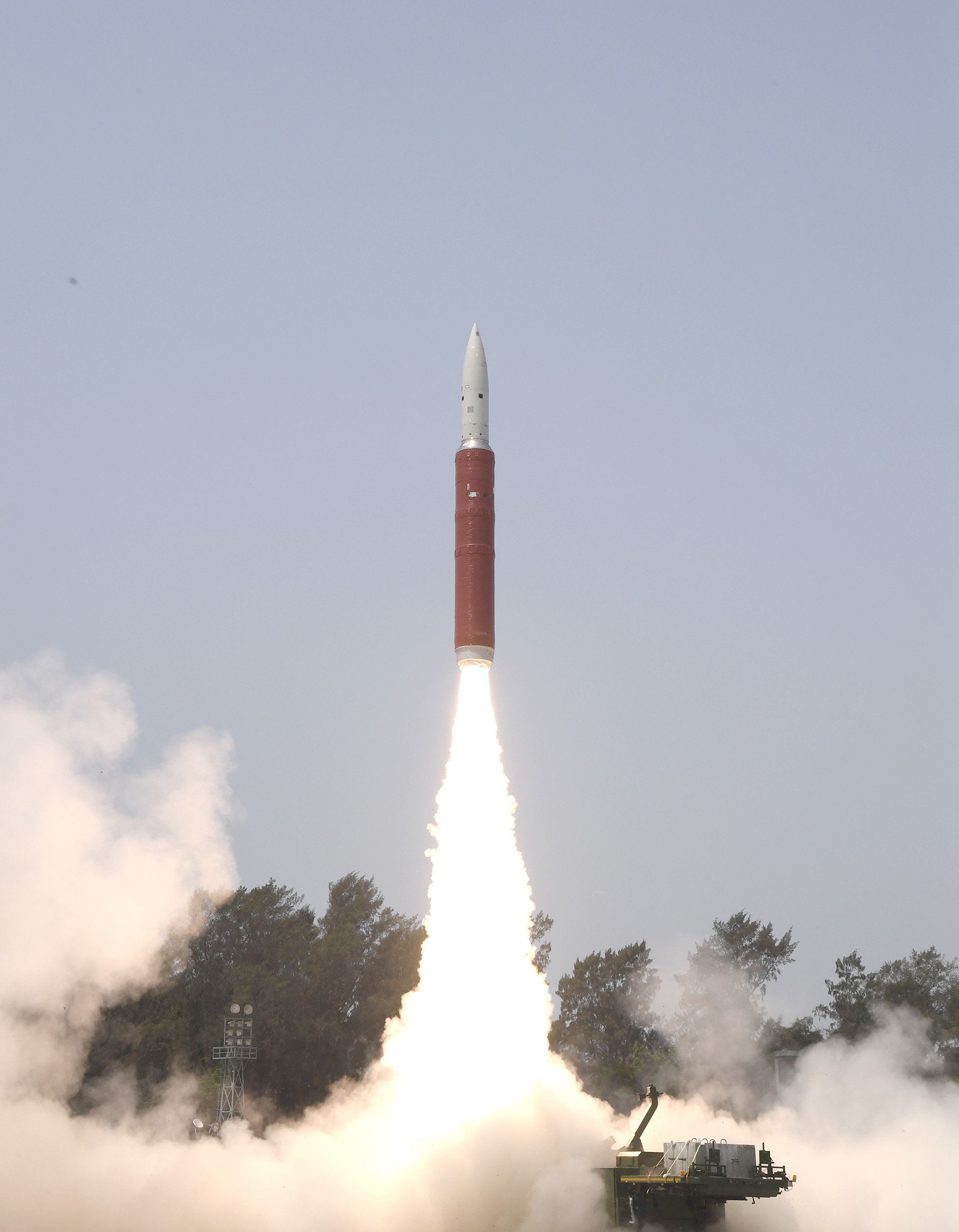
The ASAT missile, designated Prithvi Defence Vehicle Mark-II, lifting off to intercept the satellite. It is a part of the Indian Ballistic Missile Defence Programme.

The interceptor struck a test satellite at a 283 km (176 mi) altitude in low Earth orbit (LEO), thus making Mission Shakti a successful ASAT missile test. The interceptor was launched at around 05:40 UTC at the Integrated Test Range (ITR) in Abdul Kalam Island and hit its target after 168 seconds. Microsat-R was the suspected target of the test. The missile system was developed by the Defence Research and Development Organisation (DRDO) — a research wing of the Indian defence services. Prime Minister Narendra Modi addressed the nation on television, announcing the test. With this test, India became the fourth nation after United States, Russia and China with proven anti-satellite (ASAT) capabilities.

=== Interceptor ===
India officially confirmed that the ASAT missile used in the test is a Ballistic Missile Defence interceptor and is part of the Indian Ballistic Missile Defence Programme. The interceptor has the designation of Prithvi Defence Vehicle (PDV) Mark-II.

The interceptor missile involved in the test had a hit-to-kill capable Kinetic kill vehicle. Thus the missile, by nature, was a direct-ascent anti-satellite weapon. It had a length of 13 m (43 ft) and a diameter of 1.4 m (4 ft 7 in). Being a three-stage missile, it was fitted with two solid-propellant rocket motor stages and the Kill vehicle. The combined weight of the first and the second stages is 17.2 tons, with the third stage weighing 1.8 tons. The first two stages can carry 16.7 tons of fuel. DRDO Chief G. Satheesh Reddy said that although some previously developed sub-technologies were used as a basis, the interceptor was a completely new missile.

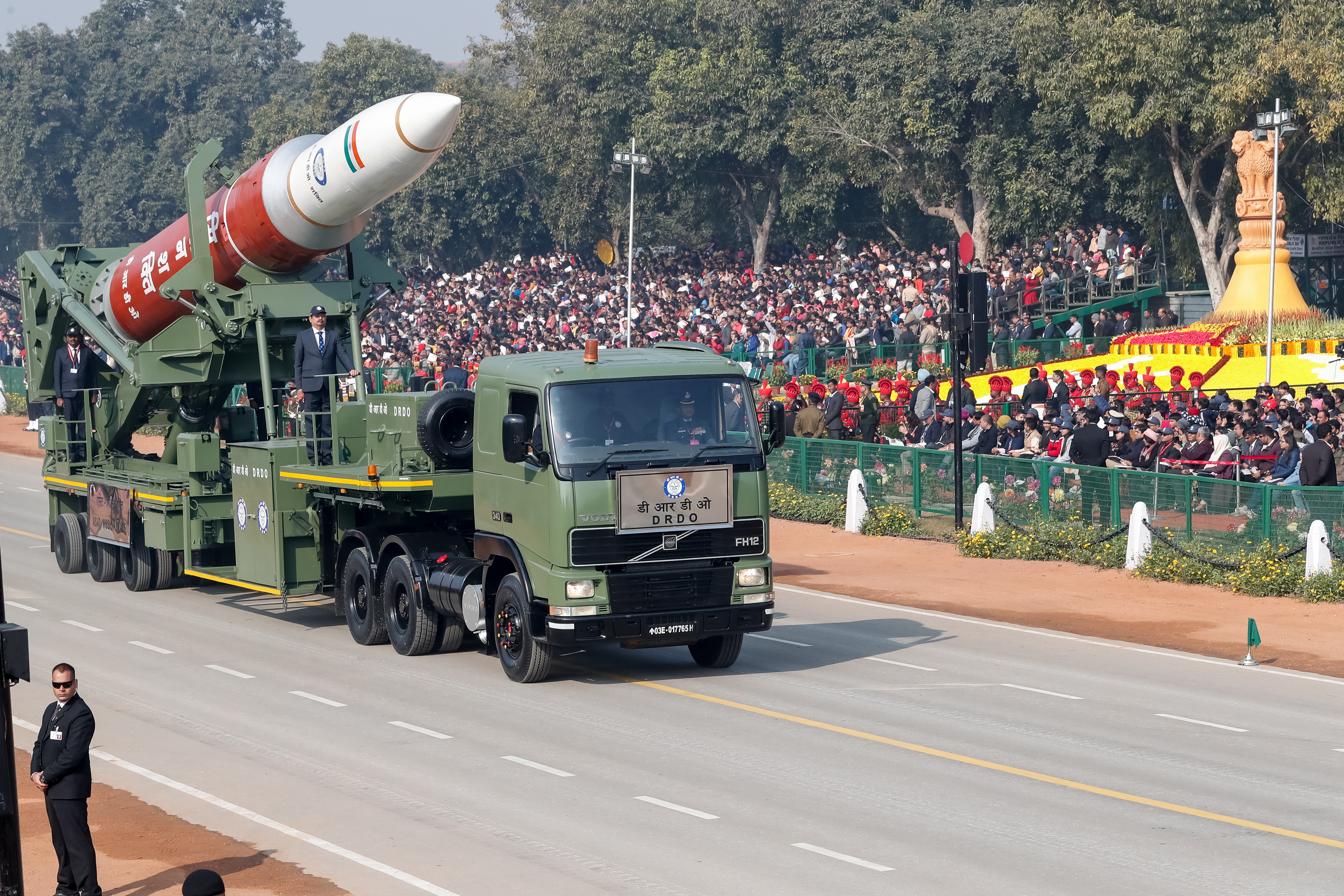
ASAT being displayed during the Republic Day Parade, 2020.

As per DRDO, the missile was capable of shooting down targets moving at a speed of 10 km/s (6.2 mi/s) at an altitude as high as 1,200 km (750 mi). However, in order to minimize the threat of debris, the interception was performed against an object moving at 7.4 km/s (4.6 mi/s) at an altitude below 300 km (190 mi). DRDO Chief G. Satheesh Reddy said that the propulsive power of the interceptor missile can be increased to make it capable of targeting satellites at medium altitudes.

The missile reportedly hit the satellite with an accuracy of less than 10 cm (3.9 in), which is comparable with the best reported performance of ASAT missiles. Some reports stated that the achieved accuracy was of a few centimetres.

According to DRDO Chief G. Satheesh Reddy, the interceptor missile is capable of shooting down all the satellites present in low Earth orbit.

==== Kill vehicle ====
The kill vehicle constituted the third stage of the interceptor missile. It had an advanced terminal guidance system on board, including a non-gimballed strap down imaging infrared seeker and an inertial navigation system that used ring-laser gyroscopes, which detected and tracked the Microsat-R satellite in low Earth orbit.

Course corrections to the Kill Vehicle's trajectory were made using a thrust-vector system. Large thrusters present at the top of the Kill Vehicle's rear cylindrical body at approximately its centre of gravity and smaller thrusters present near the back of the Kill Vehicle were used. The Kill Vehicle has the capability to destroy targets in the entire low Earth orbit region.

==== Solid rocket motor ====
Solid-propellant rocket motors formed the first two stages of the interceptor missile. These rocket motor stages took the ASAT missile to the required height and velocity. After that, the nose tip heat shield was ejected and the IIR seeker of the Kill Vehicle locked onto the satellite. The solid rocket booster used is a derivative of the technology first developed for Sagarika missile.

===== Composite propellant =====
PDV MkII uses a new generation of composite propellant that High Energy Materials Research Laboratory (HEMRL) started working on during the development phase of K Missile family. The solid fuel is highly efficient and can provide more energy compare to the fuel used in Agni missile series.

=== Target satellite ===
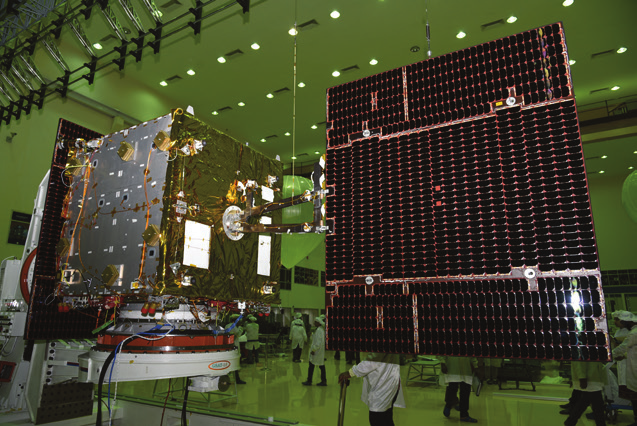
Microsat-R in satellite preparation facility.

The target of the test was Microsat-R, a satellite which was launched by ISRO on 24 January 2019. This satellite was built to serve the purpose of the test which was not disclosed to Indian Space Research Organisation. India didn't specify the name of target satellite immediately after test and merely announced that it shot down a "live" Indian satellite. The relative velocity between the missile and Microsat-R was around 10 km/s (6.2 mi/s).

Shooting down a satellite approximately present in a 300 km (190 mi) low Earth orbit is more challenging than shooting down a satellite present in a higher orbit. The transverse orbital speed of a satellite is inversely proportional to its distance from the centre of Earth, which is a direct consequence of the law of conservation of angular momentum, or equivalently, Kepler's second law.

== Aftermath ==
=== Space debris ===
In a statement released after the test, Indian Ministry of External Affairs said that the test was conducted at low altitude to ensure that the resulting debris would "decay and fall back onto the Earth within weeks".

According to Jonathan McDowell, an astrophysicist at Center for Astrophysics | Harvard & Smithsonian, some debris might persist for a year, but most should burn up in the atmosphere within several weeks. Brian Weeden of Secure World Foundation agreed, but warned about the possibility of some fragments getting boosted to higher orbits. U.S. Air Force Space Command said that it was tracking 270 pieces of debris from the test, although as of 26 September 2019 only 125 objects have been catalogued. A Dutch Space Situational Awareness consultant Marco Langbroek disputed DRDO's claim that the test was responsible. He said that the intercept was not "head on", which would have minimized debris ejection to higher altitudes, but was instead conducted at an upwards angle. He added that most of the debris would be cleared within days, but some might last a year or two.

According to NASA, 49 tracked pieces of debris remained in orbit as of 15 July 2019. Indian missile experts criticised this claim by mentioning that debris was generated in similar tests by the U.S., adding that the debris doesn't pose a threat to any spacecraft because it is in a very low orbit.

As of 26 September 2019, there were 50 tracked pieces of debris in orbit but 9 of them were lost (no updates for more than 30 days) according to astrodynamicist T. S. Kelso.

As of March 2022, only one catalogued piece of debris from Microsat-R remains in orbit: COSPAR 2019-006DE, SATCAT 44383. This final piece decayed from orbit 14 June 2022.

=== Defence Space Agency ===
India has created the Defence Space Agency to develop capabilities required to protect its interests in outer space and to deal with the threat of space wars. India conducted its first simulated space warfare exercise on 25th and 26 July 2019, called IndSpaceEx. The exercise was conducted by the Integrated Defence Staff. The exercise is expected to lead to an assessment of threats and the creation of a joint space warfare doctrine.

=== Further ASAT development ===
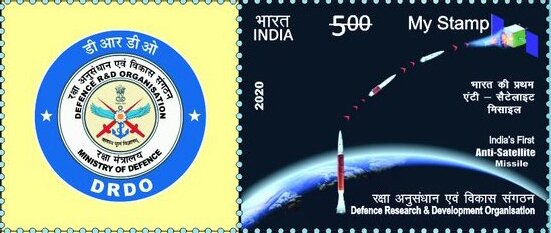
Indian Stamp in 2020

India is reportedly working on directed energy ASAT weapons, co-orbital ASAT weapons, lasers and electromagnetic pulse (EMP) based ASAT weapons. The ability to protect space assets from hostile electronic and physical attacks is also being developed.

=== Spying incident ===
Aircraft Spots, which monitors military-related aircraft movements, said that a United States Air Force reconnaissance aircraft from the Naval Support Facility Diego Garcia flew on "a mission in the Bay of Bengal to monitor India's anti-satellite missile test". This was denied by the United States Department of Defense.

== Reactions ==
=== Neighbourhood of India ===
==== People's Republic of China ====
China reacted cautiously to the test. The Chinese Foreign Ministry said that it has noticed reports about the test and was hopeful that all countries will uphold peace and tranquility in outer space.

However, state-run media of China highlighted the 'double standards' of the Western world. It said that the West did not criticize India as much as it criticized China for its ASAT 2007 test because it viewed the test from a "China-India competition perspective".

==== Pakistan ====
Pakistan asserted that space is a common heritage of mankind, saying that every nation has the duty to refrain from actions that lead to the militarization of space. Pakistan Foreign Ministry spokesperson said that boasting of such capabilities is useless, invoking the English idiom Tilting at Windmills. Pakistan also hoped that countries which have condemned such tests by other countries before "will be prepared to work towards developing international instruments to prevent military threats relating to outer space".

=== Other countries ===
==== Russia ====
Russia acknowledged India's statement on the test not being targeted against any nation and invited India to join the Russian–Chinese proposal for a treaty against weaponisation of space.

==== United States ====
Following the test, acting United States Secretary of Defense Patrick Shanahan warned about the risks of space debris caused by ASAT tests, but later added that he did not expect debris from the Indian test to last. The United States Department of State acknowledged Ministry of External Affairs' statement on space debris and reiterated its intention to pursue shared interests in space including on space security with India. Jim Bridenstine, the head of NASA, called the Indian ASAT test a "terrible thing", pointing out that debris from the explosion endangers other satellites and the International Space Station (ISS).

Acting U.S. Strategic Command commander General John E. Hyten told members of the Senate Armed Services Committee that the Indians conducted the ASAT test because they were "concerned about threats to their nation from space" while responding to a question from senators on the need for India to do such tests.

== Significance ==
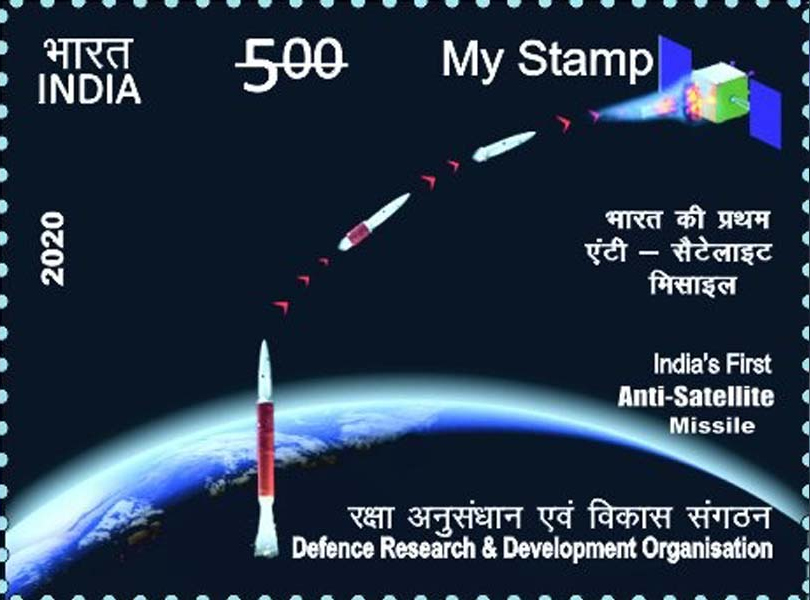
A 2020 Indian stamp dedicated to the ASAT test.

The test is considered to hold significance due to the following reasons:

- It gives India the capability to degrade and destroy the communication, reconnaissance and intelligence gathering capabilities of countries by taking out their space-based assets. It is a deterrent in effect, deterring similar actions by hostile nations.
- It shows that India has the capability to intercept Intercontinental ballistic missiles (ICBM) outside the atmosphere.
- The test potentially enables India to claim the right to be involved in the formation of future international norms and guidelines with regards to militarisation of outer space.

== See also ==
- Anti-satellite weapon
- Kill vehicle
- Militarisation of space
- Space weapon
- Space warfare
- Indian Ballistic Missile Defence Programme
- Indian Space Research Organization
- Defence Research and Development Organisation
