= INS Dhruv =

Indian Navy strategic support ship

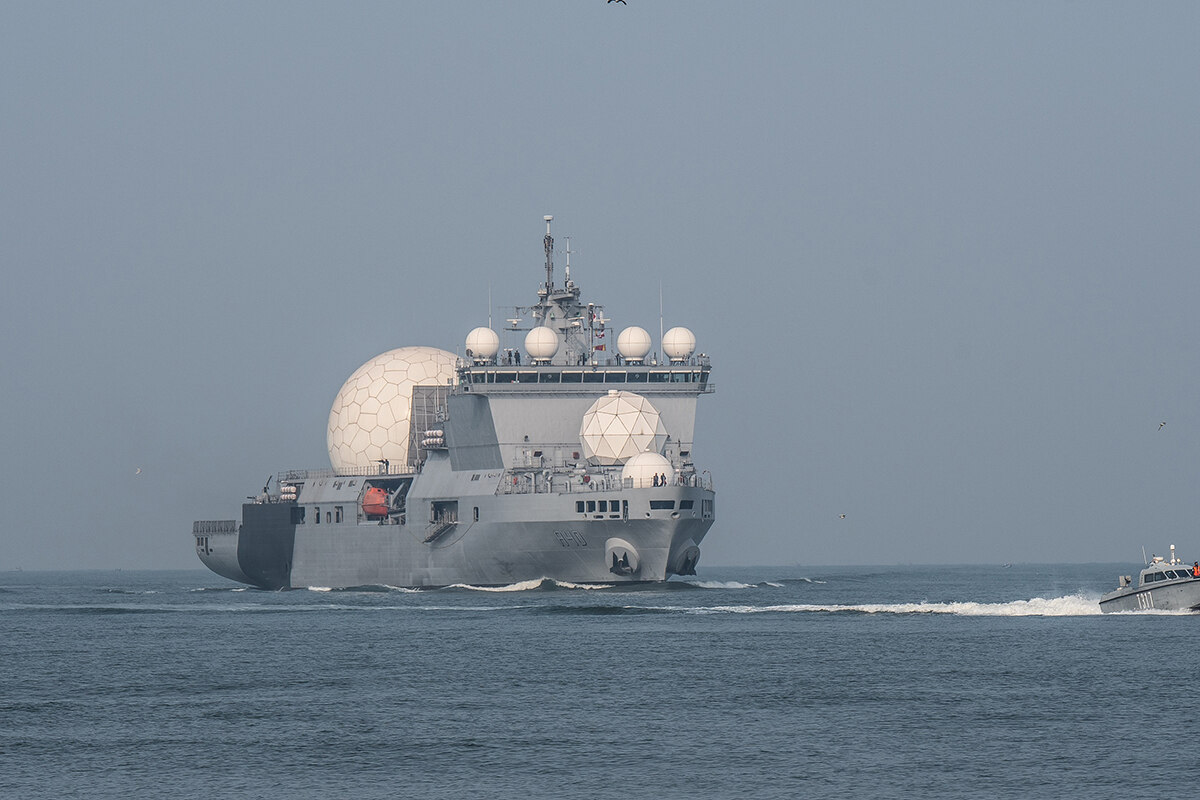
- INS Dhruv

History

India
- Name: Dhruv
- Operator: Jointly operated by Indian Navy National Technical Research Organisation Defence Research and Development Organisation
- Builder: Hindustan Shipyard Limited
- Cost: ₹1,500 crore (equivalent to ₹18 billion or US$190 million in 2026) (FY 2020)
- Laid down: 30 June 2014
- Acquired: 31 October 2020
- Commissioned: 10 September 2021
- Identification: Pennant number: A40
- Status: Active

General characteristics
- Type: Ocean surveillance and missile tracking ship
- Displacement: 15,000 t (15,000 long tons)
- Length: 175 m (574 ft 2 in)
- Beam: 22 m (72 ft 2 in)
- Draught: 6 m (19 ft 8 in)
- Propulsion: 2 × diesel engines in CODAD, 9,000 kW (12,000 hp) each; 3 × auxiliary generators 1,200 kW (1,600 hp) each; 15 MW power
- Speed: 21 kn (39 km/h; 24 mph)
- Complement: 300
- Sensors & processing systems: X-Band AESA radar; S-Band AESA radar
- Armament: AK 630
- Aircraft carried: 1 × helicopter

INS Dhruv (A40) is a research vessel and missile range instrumentation ship built by India's Hindustan Shipyard Limited (HSL). The ship was earlier only known by its shipyard designated yard number as VC-11184.

The ship can gather electronic intelligence and will be used to track missile and satellites to aid India's strategic weapons and anti-ballistic missiles. It will be jointly operated by National Technical Research Organisation (NTRO), Defence Research and Development Organisation (DRDO) and the Indian Navy. The development span of ships has remained largely secretive with little information in public domain. The ship reportedly started sea trials in early 2019, and entered service in October 2020 without a public commissioning ceremony. The ship was officially commissioned on 10 September 2021 at Visakhapatnam in the presence of senior officials from the Indian Navy, the DRDO and the NTRO.

== Development ==
The purpose of the ship is to support the development of India's strategic weapons and the Indian Ballistic Missile Defence Programme. The ship can also track strategic missiles and satellites. In addition, it can also gather electronic intelligence. The keel of the ship was laid on 30 June 2014 at Hindustan Shipyard Limited. It is being built under a classified and confidential programme which is directly under the control of the Prime Minister's Office and the National Security Advisor, similar to the Advanced Technology Vessel (ATV) programme of the Indian Navy. The ship started harbour trials in July 2018 and was expected to undergo sea trials by the end of 2018. As of March 2019, sea trials were ongoing. The ship was delivered to the Indian Navy in October 2020 quietly meanwhile official induction expected on first half of 2021.

== Design and description ==
The ship cost around ₹1,500 crore (equivalent to ₹26 billion or US$270 million in 2026) and has been designed in India by Vik Sandvik Design India. It has a displacement of more than 10,000 tonnes, length of 175 metre, beam of 22 metre, draught of 6 metre and can attain a speed of 21 knots. It is powered by two imported 9,000 kilowatt combined diesel and diesel (CODAD) configuration engines and three 1200 kilowatt auxiliary generators.

The ship will be fitted with a primary X band and a secondary S band active electronically scanned array (AESA) radar. In addition, it has a long open deck with ample space for installing multiple missile tracking antennas. It will have a crew complement of 300 personnel and will carry a single helicopter. The ship will also have a special team from National Technical Research Organisation on board.

== Commissioning ==
The ship was commissioned by NSA Ajit Doval on 10 September 2021 in Visakhapatnam. The ship will be jointly operated by National Technical Research Organisation (NTRO), Defence Research and Development Organisation (DRDO) and the Indian Navy.

INS Dhruv will be under Strategic Forces Command (SFC) and based in Eastern Naval Command of Indian Navy.

== Service ==
INS Dhruv had its first mission deployment to support Mission Divyastra, the planned test on an Agni-V missile with MIRV technologies. It successfully tracked the test flight on March 11 2024. The project directors will examine the trajectory and other variables of the missile as recorded by the Indian ballistic missile tracker INS Dhruv to make any operational changes if required.

== See also ==
- INS Anvesh - another missile range instrumentation ship
- List of active Indian Navy ships
- Future of the Indian Navy
- Ranks of the Indian Navy
