= INS Anvesh =

Missile range instrumentation ship

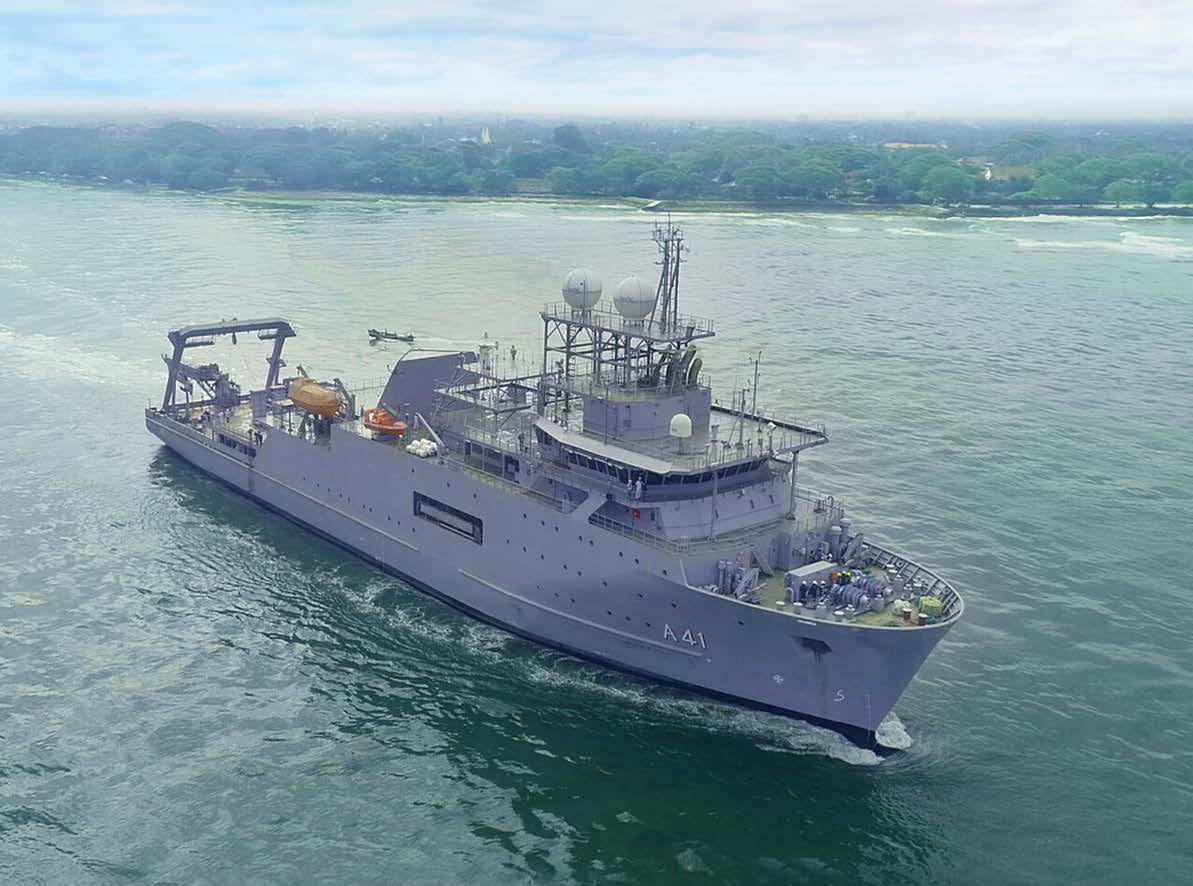
- INS Anvesh (A41), during its sea trials..

History

India
- Name: Anvesh
- Operator: Indian Navy; Defence Research and Development Organisation
- Builder: Cochin Shipyard Limited
- Cost: ₹425 crore
- Laid down: 27 January 2016
- Commissioned: 11 March 2022
- Identification: Pennant number: A41
- Status: Active

General characteristics
- Type: Missile range instrumentation vessel and Floating Test Range (FTR)
- Displacement: 11,300 tonnes (11,122 long tons; 12,456 short tons)
- Length: 118.40 m (388 ft 5 in)
- Beam: 20 m (65 ft 7 in)
- Draught: 7.1 m (23 ft 4 in)
- Depth: 10.40 m (34 ft 1 in)
- Installed power: 3 x 4320 ekW (Main Gen Set); 1 x 1350 ekW (Aux Gen Set)
- Propulsion: Integrated Electric Propulsion; 2 × 5,000 kW (6,705 hp) prop motor; 2 x 4,200 mm (165 in) CPP-Contra-Rotaing Pod Propeller; 1 × 1,000 kW (1,341 hp) Forward Tunnel Thruster
- Speed: Over 18.5 knots (34.3 km/h; 21.3 mph)
- Endurance: 45 days
- Complement: 165
- Sensors & processing systems: LRDE Long-Range Multi Function Radar
- Armament: 4 x Ship Launch Systems for BMD test missiles

INS Anvesh (Hindi: अन्वेष; lit. Search), is a missile range instrumentation ship (also termed as a Floating Test Range (FTR)) built for the Indian Navy. The ship is a project of the Defence Research and Development Organisation (DRDO) and built by Cochin Shipyard Limited (CSL).

The ship was conceived to serve as a sea-based platform for India's ballistic missile defence program and consists of 4 Ship Launch System (SLS) VLS for the same purpose. The Phase II of the BMD envisages intercepting and destroying enemy missile up to range of 5,000 kilometers by kinetic force with the FTR allowing live testing of the interdictor missiles and not computer simulations.

== Design ==
INS Anvesh was designed by Vik-Sandvik Design India Pvt Ltd ("VSDI"). It has a length of 118.4 m, 20 m width and 7.1 m draft and having a steel weight of approximately 3,900 tons.

The ship incorporates LRDE Long-Range Multi Function Radar (LRMFR) which will be used by Indian naval ships in future as Fire control radars for Ballistic Missile Defence. The 6 metre Active Antenna Array Unit (AAAU) for the radar was built by Astra Microwave Products Ltd. the first of which would be delivered in latter half of 2023. The LRMFR is an S-band radar system which is intended to replace the EL/M-2248 MF-STAR radar used by the Indian Navy as the primary naval radar of the next generation of naval ships. The functions of LRMFR includes acting as Fire Control Radar (FCR) for surface-to-air missile systems onboard ships and to track ballistic missiles.

The vessel equipped with electro-optical missile tracking, S-band radar tracking, telemetry devices apart from a launch pad, control and mission control center, for testing its Phase II of Ballistic Missile Defence (BMD) interceptor missiles. The Phase II of the BMD envisages intercepting and destroying enemy missile up to range of 5,000 kilometers by kinetic force with the FTR allowing live testing of the interdictor missiles and not computer simulations.

The missile launch system consists of 4 Ship Launching Systems (SLS) in the aft section which rests at 0° when not in used but the alignment is changed to 90° during test launches. The SLS was developed by Electropneumatics & Hydraulics Pvt Ltd. The ship has other specialised systems like damping tanks, missile integration and checkout bay, data processing room and mission control center. It is also equipped with a 15 ton crane and A-frame for cargo handling in the aft section.

It is also designed to test radars, sonars, telemetry equipment and propulsion. The configuration of the installed power generation is Integrated Full Electric Propulsion (IFEP). The output is 14 MW which is produced by diesel generators powering steerable contra-rotating propulsion thrusters.

== Construction ==
The construction of the then-DRDO Technology Demonstration Vessel was awarded to the Cochin Shipyard Limited (CSL) by the DRDO, India's premier agency for R&D in defence, in August 2015.

The original contract for the construction of the vessel was with Bharati Shipyard, but time overruns forced by the yard's poor finances led to termination of the contract. Subsequently, the Cochin Shipyard won the bid to execute this project.

Steel plate cutting of the vessel was started on 10 August 2016. Dr. S Christopher, chairman, DRDO and Secretary, Department of Defence R&D, launched the mega block assembly of hull blocks of the ship (Ship No. 20) on 27 January 2016 at CSL.

The ceremonial event of commencement of Mega Block Assembly of hull blocks of Ship No. 20, the Technology Demonstration Vessel, being built for the Defence Research & Development Organisation (DRDO), Government of India was held on 27 January 2017 at CSL.

It was reported that the ship will commence the sea trial in September 2021 and will be commissioned by the end of 2021.

== Commissioning ==
The ship had been quietly commissioned by National Security Advisor Ajit Doval on 11 March 2022. A photo of the commissioning ceremony has been made public for the first time in the Indian Navy Song 2022: 'Hum Taiyyar hain'.

== Service history ==
The first missile test onboard INS Anvesh was carried out on 21 April 2023 off the Odisha coast. The missile tested was an Advanced Air Defence (AAD) or Ashwin Ballistic Missile Interceptor. The missile included India in the list of countries who have developed naval BMD systems.She participated at the International Fleet Review 2026 held at Visakapatanam.

== See also ==
- INS Dhruv
- Strategic Forces Command
- Future of the Indian Navy
- Indian Ballistic Missile Defense Programme
