= Satheesh =

Satheesh may refer to:

- Satheesh Kurup Indian cinematographer
- G. Satheesh Reddy Scientific Adviser
