= DRDO Floating Test Range =

Indian ship

Class overview
- Name: Floating Test Range (FTR)
- Operators: DRDO
- Built: Since 2015
- Building: 1

General characteristics
- Type: Missile testing range
- Displacement: 11,300 tonnes (11,122 long tons)
- Length: 200 m (656 ft 2 in)
- Beam: 60 m (196 ft 10 in)
- Sensors & processing systems: Electro-optical missile tracking system, S Band radar, tracking and telemetry systems

Floating Test Range (FTR) is a ship designed by the Defence Research and Development Organisation of India which will serve as a missile testing range.

== Description ==
=== Characteristics ===
The Floating Test Range (FTR) is a ship designed by the Defence Research and Development Organisation which is expected to serve as a testing range for missiles. It has a displacement of 10,000 tonnes (9,842 long tons) and a length of 200 m (656 ft 2 in) with a width of 60 m (196 ft 10 in). The ship is equipped with an Electro-optical missile tracking system, a S-Band radar, and tracking and telemetry systems. Facilities such as a Launch pad, a Mission control center and a Launch control centre are also present.

The FTR will capable of launching missiles with ranges up to around 1,500 km (930 miles).

=== Purpose ===
The FTR will enable DRDO to overcome some of the disadvantages of testing missiles from the Abdul Kalam Island. It will enable testing of missiles at different trajectories and altitudes and various ranges by avoiding landmass and sea-lanes related constraints. Since missile testing from the FTR can be performed in the ocean, minimal safety precautions will be required. This will facilitate faster development of missile projects since advanced warnings and notices to ships and planes would not be required, and will minimise the risk of civilian damage.

The FTR is expected to facilitate the development of the Phase-II of the Indian Ballistic Missile Defence Programme.

== Construction ==
Construction work on the ship started in 2015 and was initially expected to be completed within 3–4 years. As of October 2019, the ship is expected to be fully ready by 2020.

== See also ==
- Indian Ballistic Missile Defence Programme
