= Jawaharlal Nehru Technological University, Anantapur =

State University in Andhra Pradesh, India

Coordinates: 14.649831°N 77.606429°E

Jawaharlal Nehru Technological University
- Motto: Yogah karmasu kaushalam
- Motto in English: excellence in action is yoga
- Type: Education and Research Institution
- Established: 1946; 80 years ago
- Chancellor: Governor of Andhra Pradesh
- Vice-Chancellor: Hanchate Sudarsana Rao
- Location: Anantapur, Andhra Pradesh, India
- Campus: Rural
- Website: www.jntua.ac.in

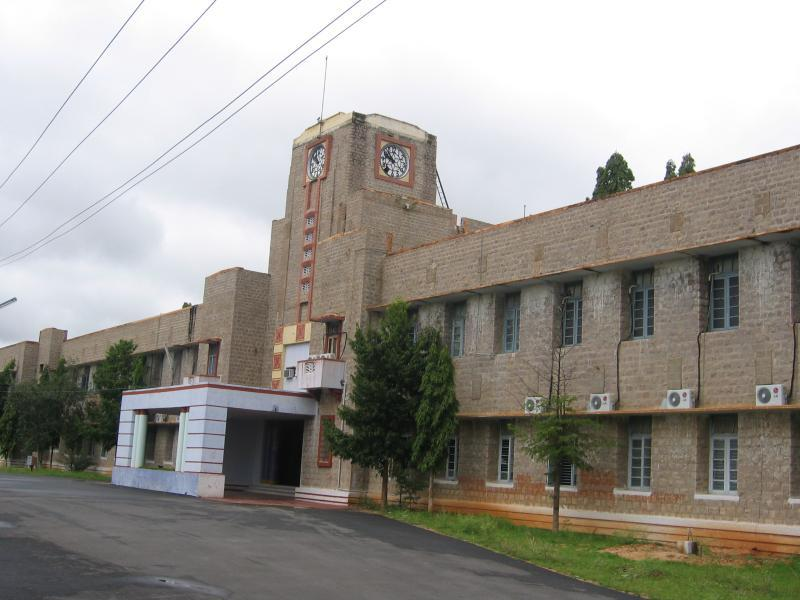
Jawaharlal Nehru Technological University, Anantapur

Jawaharlal Nehru Technological University, Anantapur (JNTU Anantapur) is a state university in Anantapur, Andhra Pradesh, India. Founded in 1946, it has since 1973 been a constituent college of Jawaharlal Nehru Technological University, as set by The Jawaharlal Nehru Technological University Act, 1972. In 2008 it had received autonomous status by the Jawaharlal Nehru Technological Universities Act, 2008.

== History ==
At the time when there was only one Government Engineering College at Guindy Madras for the entire former composite Madras province, three new Government Engineering Colleges were sanctioned under post World War II reconstruction programme, one at Coimbatore (1945), one at Kakinada (1946) and one at Anantapur (1946). The College of Engineering Anantapur was temporarily located at Guindy in 1946 and later shifted to Anantapur in 1948. The first batch of 60 students was admitted into the college at Guindy, Madras on 10 June 1946. Major B.H. Marley was appointed as the first full-fledged Principal of the college after the college shifted to Anantapur. The college was located in the Military Meat & Dehydration factory in the present old campus.

The college was formally inaugurated at Anantapur by the then Honorable Chief Minister O.Ramaswamy Reddiar. Later, about 300 acres of land was acquired to establish a new campus. The College Main Building, three Laboratories, one Workshop Block and Power House were constructed in 1958 with a total cost of INR 18 Lakhs. The college was initially affiliated with Madras University from 1946-1955 and with Sri Venkateswara University, Tirupathi from 1955-1972.

In the year 1972, under a broad policy of framework of providing technological education required for the industrial growth of the country in general and more particularly for the state of Andhra Pradesh, Jawaharlal Nehru Technological University (JNTU) was established on 2 October 1972 by an act of State Legislature; rightly named after the ardent lover of Science and Technology, Pandit Jawaharlal Nehru, the first Prime Minister of India. Government Engineering College Anantapur, Government Engineering College Kakinada and Government Engineering College Nagarjunasagar (later it was shifted to Hyderabad) were made as its constituent units. JNT University started functioning from Hyderabad. Thus, the College of Engineering, Anantapur went into the fold of JNTU and the college was renamed as JNTU College of Engineering Anantapur. Subsequently, JNTU Act 1972 was amended by JNTU Ordinance, 1992 to affiliate any other college or institution notified by State Government of Andhra Pradesh. Over time JNTU, Hyderabad has become a multi-campus university.

Later in the year 2008, JNTU, Hyderabad was divided into four independent universities. The Jawaharlal Nehru Technological University Anantapur (JNTUA) was established on 18 August 2008 by an Act of the Legislature of the State of Andhra Pradesh. JNTUA started functioning in the premises of JNTU College of Engineering, Anantapur (Formerly College of Engineering Anantapur). JNTU College of Engineering, Anantapur became a constituent college of JNTUA and was renamed as JNTUA College of Engineering, Anantapur. The JNTUA College of Engineering, Pulivendula, established in the year 2006 and Oil Technology Research Institute (OTRI), Anantapur, established in the year 1948 also became constituent units of JNTUA. A new constituent college – JNTUA College of Engineering, Kalikiri established in 2013 also came under the fold of JNTUA. The OTRI was later renamed as Oil Technology and Pharmaceutical Research Institute (OTPRI), in 2016. In addition to the above four constituent colleges, the JNTUA has 98 Engineering Colleges, 33 Pharmacy Colleges and 29 stand-alone MBA/MCA colleges affiliated to it.

== Organisation and administration ==
=== Governance ===
This university consists of the constituent and affiliated colleges. The main officers and councils of the university are chancellor, vice-chancellor (VC), rector, executive council and academic senate. The Governor of Andhra Pradesh is the chancellor of the university. The first vice-chancellor of the university was Prof. B. Krishna Gandhi. As of July 2019, the VC in-charge is Prof. S. Srinivas Kumar and the rector is Prof. V. Bhaskar Desai.

=== Constituent colleges ===
- JNTUA - Ananthapuramu
- JNTUA - Pulivendula
- JNTUA - Kalikiri
- JNTUA - (OTPRI) - Ananthapuramu

== Academics ==
=== Academic programmes ===
An institution with academic and research-oriented courses, the B. Tech programs (undergraduate programs) number about 25. Major branches among them are Aeronautical Engineering, Bio-Technology, Information Technology, Electronics, Electrical, Mechanical, Electronics & Instrumentation Engineering, Chemical, B. Pharmacy and Civil. A few courses are offered through the correspondence-cum-contact mode.

The postgraduate programs number 77, namely M. Tech, MSIT, MBA, MCA and MSc. The major branches are Bio-Technology, Biochemical Engineering, Chemical Engineering, Civil Engineering, Electronics and Communication Engineering, Water Resources, Mechanical Engineering, Nano-Technology, Energy Systems, Environmental Studies, Microbiology, Food Technology, Management, Computer Applications, Pharmaceutical Sciences, Environmental Geomatics and Environmental Management

=== Rankings ===
University and college rankings

Engineering – India
- NIRF (2024): 151-200

The National Institutional Ranking Framework (NIRF) ranked Jawaharlal Nehru Technological University, Anantapur in the 151-200 band among engineering colleges in 2024.

=== Sports ===
JNTUA, Ananthapuramu – Inter University Tournaments – 2019 – 20 – Selection Dates of Certain JNTUA Teams – Deputation of players. JNTUA – Tennis (Men) team – participation in South Zone Inter University Tournament at Jain University, Bangalore.

=== Grading system ===
JNTU Anantapur awards marks, class/division to students at the semester or degree level as per the academic regulations of the university. All the affiliated 'non-autonomous' colleges assess the students by a marking system. An aggregate score is calculated out of 100 as a percentage. Before R15 regulation the final score of students is not calculated as a GPA but instead used to award classes according to the marks obtained.

From 2015 onwards (according to the R15 regulation) JNTUA started following Cumulative Grade Point Average (CGPA) system on scale of 10.

For students who completed their Bachelor's and Master's degree before 2015 (Grading system before implementing R15 academic regulation of the university for affiliated colleges) the grading system is as follows:

Class Awarded	% of Marks Range	
First Class with Distinction	70% or more	From the aggregate marks secured for the best 220 Credits
First Class	Below 70% but not less than 60%	From the aggregate marks secured for the best 220 Credits
Second Class	Below 60% but not less than 50%	From the aggregate marks secured for the best 220 Credits
Pass Class	Below 50% but not less than 40%	From the aggregate marks secured for the best 220 Credits
Fail Class	Below 40%	From the aggregate marks secured for the best 220 Credits

For batches starting from 2015, Grading system according to the R15 academic regulation of the university:

Marks Range	Grade	Grade point assigned
>=95	S	10
90-94	A1	9.5
85-89	A2	9.0
80-84	A3	8.5
75-79	B1	8.0
70-74	B2	7.5
65-69	C1	7.0
60-64	C2	6.5
55-59	D1	6.0
50-54	D2	5.5
45-49	E1	5.0
40-44	E2	4.5
<40	F (Fail)	0
Absent	AB (Absent)	0

== Notable alumni ==
- G. Satheesh Reddy, B.Tech in ECE, Indian Missile Scientist, current chairman of DRDO
- S. P. Balasubrahmanyam, Indian film playback singer, actor, music director, voice actor and film producer
