= Avinash Chander (scientist) =

Indian scientist

11th Director General of Defence Research and Development Organisation
- In office 2013-2015
- Preceded by: Vijay Kumar Saraswat
- Succeeded by: S. Christopher

Avinash Chander is an Indian scientist who was Scientific Adviser to the Defence Minister, the Director General of Defence Research and Development Organisation (DRDO), and Secretary, Department of Defence Research and Development. He had succeeded V. K. Saraswat in this post but was sacked by the union government due to incompetency.

He is the chief architect of the Agni series of ballistic missile systems. Chander is a recipient of the Padma Shri from the Government of India

== Education ==
Chander joined DRDO after completing his training in Electrical Engineering from Indian Institute of Technology Delhi (IIT Delhi). He subsequently pursued an MS in Spatial Information Technology and Doctorate from Jawaharlal Nehru Technological University, Hyderabad (JNTU, Hyderabad).

== Sacking from DRDO ==
After completion of 42 years of Service in DRDO, on 14 January 2015, the Department of Personnel and Training advised his contract to end due to poor performance on 31 January 2015.

== Awards ==
Chander is recipient of numerous awards, some of which are listed below:

1. IIT Delhi Alumni Award
2. Padma Shri
3. DRDO Scientist of the year, 1989
4. Astronautical Society of India Award, 1997
5. Awarded by Dr. R. Chidambaram, Principal Scientific Advisor to Govt. of India.
6. AGNI Self-Reliance Award, 1999
7. Dr. Biren Roy Space Science Award, 2000
8. DRDO Award, 2007
9. Outstanding Technologist Award, 2008
10. DRDO Technology Leadership Award, 2008
11. Fellow, Indian National Academy of Engineers
12. Fellow, System Society of India
13. Fellow, Andhra Pradesh Academy of Sciences
14. Vice-president, Astronautical Society of India
15. Chairman – Sensors Research Society, India
16. Aryabhata Award - Astronautical Society of India.
17. Eminent Engineer Award, The Institute of Engineers (India) 2016.
