= Abdul Kalam Island =

Island off the coast of India

Dr. Abdul Kalam Island
- Location within Odisha

Geography
- Location: Bay of Bengal
- Coordinates: 20°45′28″N 87°05′02″E
- Area: 390 acres (160 ha)
- Length: 2 km (1.2 mi)

Administration
- India
- State: Odisha
- District: Bhadrak

Dr. Abdul Kalam Island, formerly known as Wheeler Island, is an island off the coast of Odisha, India, approximately 150 kilometres (93 mi) east of the state capital Bhubaneswar. The island was originally named after English commandant Lieutenant Hugh Wheeler. On 4 September 2015, the island was renamed to honour the former Indian president, Dr. A. P. J. Abdul Kalam. The Integrated Test Range missile testing facility operated by the DRDO is located on the island, and serves as the test facility for most of India's missiles such as the Akash, Agni, Astra, BrahMos, Nirbhay, Prahaar, Prithvi, Shaurya Missile, Advanced Air Defence, Prithvi Air Defence, Kusha system, LR–LARCM, SMART missile and ASAT missiles.

== Geography ==
Abdul Kalam Island is one among a group of five islands located in the Bay of Bengal, approximately 10 kilometres (6.2 mi) off the eastern coast of India, and about 70 kilometres (43 mi) south of Chandipur in Balasore district, Odisha. The island is about 2 kilometres (1.2 mi) in length and 390 acres (1.6 km^{2}) in area. The nearest port is Dhamra Port. The island is part of Bhadrak district.

== Integrated Test Range ==
The Integrated Test Range (ITR) is a missile testing facility composed of two complexes - Launch Complex-IV (LC-IV) located on Abdul Kalam Island and Launch Complex-III (LC-III) located at Chandipur, Balasore district.

== History ==
In the early 1980s the Government of India began searching for a suitable location to construct a dedicated military missile test range and begin development of the Agni series of ballistic missiles. The Defence Research and Development Organisation (DRDO) constructed an interim facility adjacent to the Proof and Experimental Establishment (PXE) at Chandipur. In 1986, the Union Government announced plans to construct a National Test Range at Baliapal in Balasore district, the same district as Chandipur. This would have required the government to move 130,000 people out of 130 villages located in the area. Agni-I was first tested at Launch Complex-III in Chandipur on 22 May 1989. In 1995, the Government abandoned the plan to move the test range from Chandipur to Baliapal, and instead built a new test site known as Launch Complex-IV at Abdul Kalam Island.

Dr. A. P. J. Abdul Kalam was appointed as the first director of the Integrated Test Range in 1982. Following the successful demonstration of the Prithvi missile in October 1993, the Indian Army requested the DRDO to conduct a confirmatory test on a land range to validate circular error probability. The Army was not convinced that the missile met the specified 150 meters accuracy, and wanted it fired on land to clearly view its impact point. The DRDO was unable to conduct the test at its desert range in Rajasthan because of concerns about range safety and geopolitical issues, and ruled out the Andaman and Nicobar Islands because they were far from the mainland. The agency decided to seek an uninhabited island off India's east coast to resolve the issue. Kalam spotted three small islands off Dhamra's coast, which were marked on a hydrographic map as Long Wheeler, Coconut Wheeler and Small Wheeler.

Kalam sent scientists Dr V. K. Saraswat and Dr S.K. Salwan to locate the islands. The team hired a boat from Dhamra for ₹250 (equivalent to ₹1,800 or US$19 in 2023), and armed with a directional compass, set off to locate the islands. However, they became lost and were unable to find the island until they came across some fishing vessels. The fishermen stated that they had not heard of Wheeler Island but provided directions to a nearby island they referred to as "Chandrachood", which they thought could be Wheeler Island. After Saraswat and Salwan reached "Chandrachood island", they confirmed that it was the same as Small Wheeler island on the map, and that it had the appropriate dimensions to host a missile testing facility. The team had to remain overnight on the island surviving only on bananas. In Ignited Minds: Unleashing the Power Within India (2002), Kalam wrote, "to their surprise they [Saraswat and Salwan] found a Bangladeshi flag flying atop a tree, as the island may have been frequented by fishermen from the neighbouring country. My friends quickly removed the flag". Kalam received clearance from then Defence Minister (and Prime Minister) P. V. Narasimha Rao to acquire the island, and wrote a letter to then Odisha Chief Minister Biju Patnaik requesting the use of the islands.

The DRDO had received indications that there were several reasons why the Chief Minister's Office would not be willing to allocate the island. Kalam received a meeting with Patnaik ten days after his request. According to Kalam, "When we reached his office, the file was in front of him. Chief Minister Biju Patnaik ji said, Kalam, I have decided to give all the five islands at no cost to you [DRDO], but I will sign the file of approval only when you give me a promise. Chief Minister held my hand and said, I have an invitation to visit China. I will visit only when you promise that you will make a missile that will reach China. I said, Chief Minister Sir, definitely, we will work for it. I immediately informed our Defence Minister. Chief Minister signed the file and I got the island, particularly the Small Wheeler island." The Odisha government leased the islands to DRDO for 99 years. Kalam referred to the island as his "Theatre of Action".

The first missile test conducted on Abdul Kalam Island was the successful test of the Prithvi missile on 30 November 1993. All three armed forces services chiefs witnessed the event. Dr. S.K. Salwan stated that "the entire Island was on fire after the strike, which had hit bullseye". The missile test had an accuracy of 27 meters, which was far more accurate than the Army's required 150 meters. A granite memorial called Prithvi Point stands at the location of the original impact point of the test. Wheeler Island was uninhabited when it was allocated to the DRDO. Since the construction of the Integrated Test Range, entry to Abdul Kalam Island is restricted for the general public, and only DRDO personnel and Defence Ministry officials are permitted to travel to the island. Some journalists have also visited the island. The island is largely empty for most of the year and staffed only by security personnel, but may host thousands of scientists, technicians and other staff during missile tests.

The test facility includes a launch pad, missile assembly/checkout buildings, and several administrative, and support buildings. The facility is only accessible by ship, as there is no airport or bridge connecting the island to the mainland. It does have a small helipad, but missile airframes and all supplies, construction materials and heavy equipment arrive by ship. Abdul Kalam Island also has a 2.3 kilometer long railway line which connects the missile assembly buildings and is used to carry missile airframes from the pier to the launch pad. The island also has residential and other facilities for DRDO scientists and staff.

== Biodiversity ==
Abdul Kalam Island is located close to the Gahirmatha Marine Sanctuary, the world's largest rookery of the endangered olive ridley sea turtle. Abdul Kalam Island's sandy beaches are a favoured nesting location for the turtles. The bright lights installed at the missile testing facility on the island caused some baby turtles to get lost as they were attracted towards the lights. Many baby turtles would fail to find their way to sea, and some died as a result. To protect the turtles, all lights at the facility are dimmed or masked during nesting season, and missile testing is restrained during the turtles' nesting and breeding season. The DRDO stated that around 150,000 olive ridley turtles had laid eggs on Abdul Kalam Island's beaches in February–March 2013 and that the number of turtles was growing.

In May 2013, increasing concern has been drawn to the change of the island's topography, owing to sand erosion. Since the island is technically a shoal, seawater frequently causes sand-shifting. The DRDO sought the assistance of geological experts from National Institute of Ocean Technology to monitor the situation.

== Gallery ==
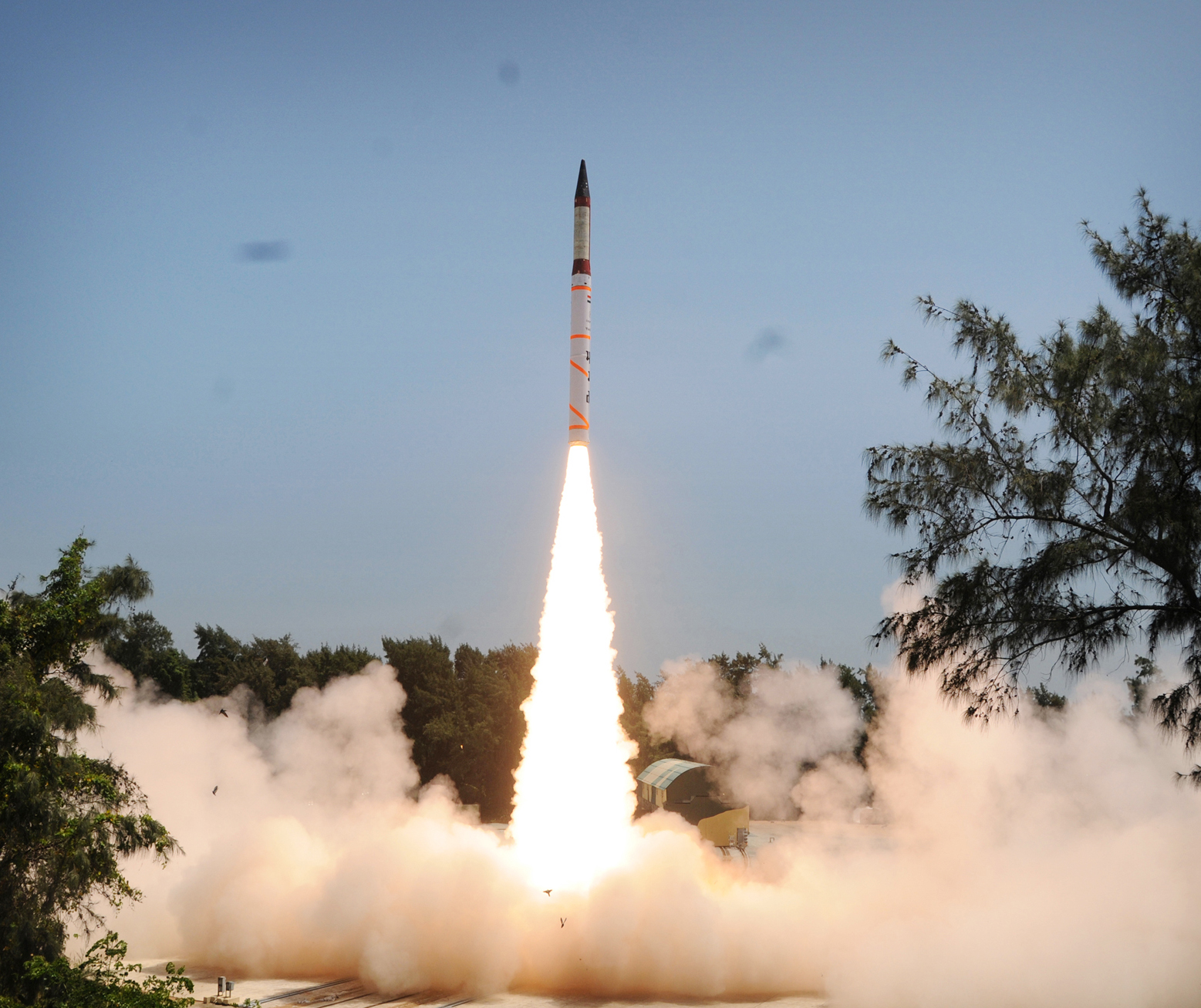
DRDO conducting the Agni-IV demonstration on Dr Abdul Kalam Island

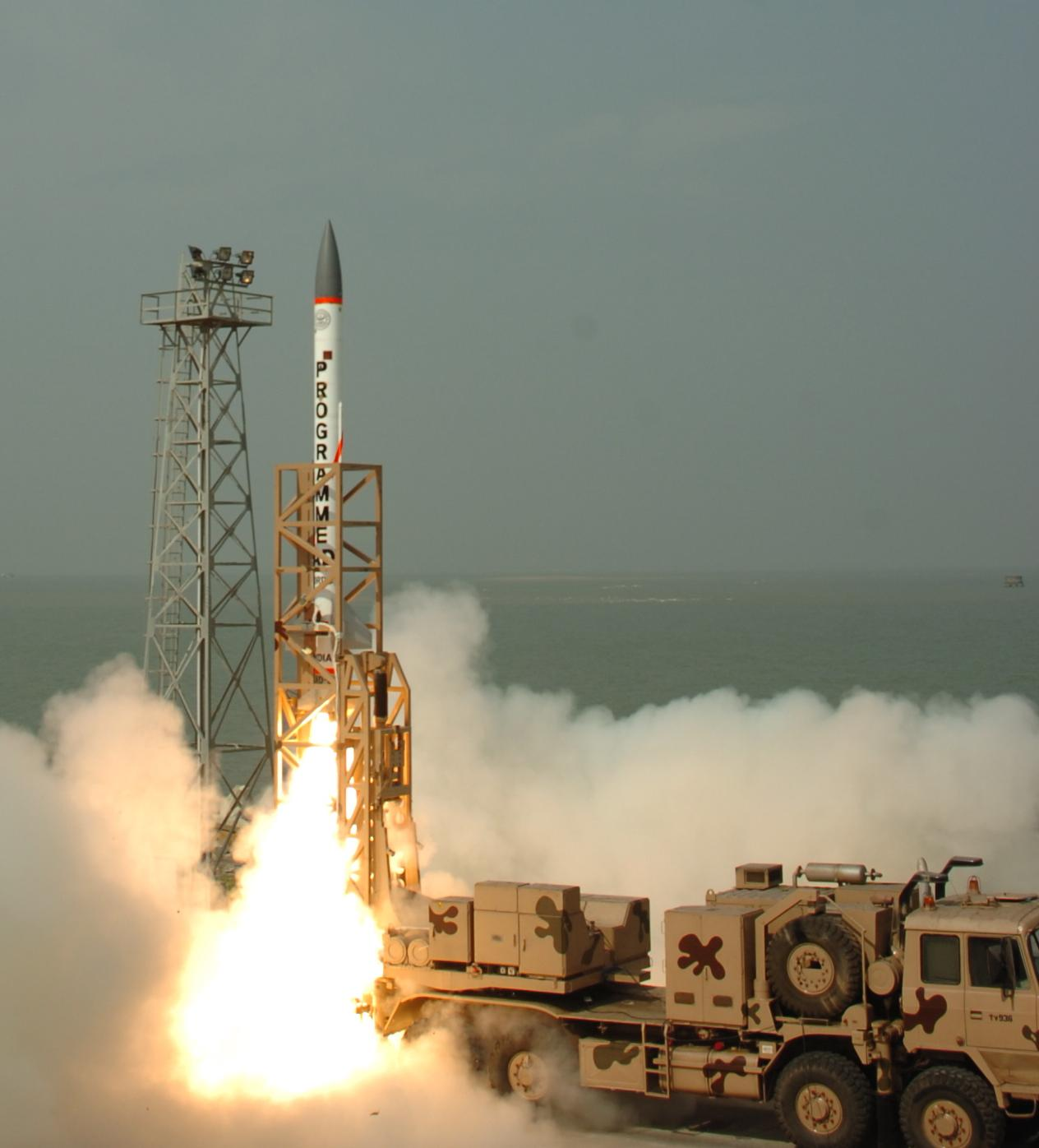
Advanced Air Defence Launch from Integrated Test Range (ITR), Dr Abdul Kalam Island

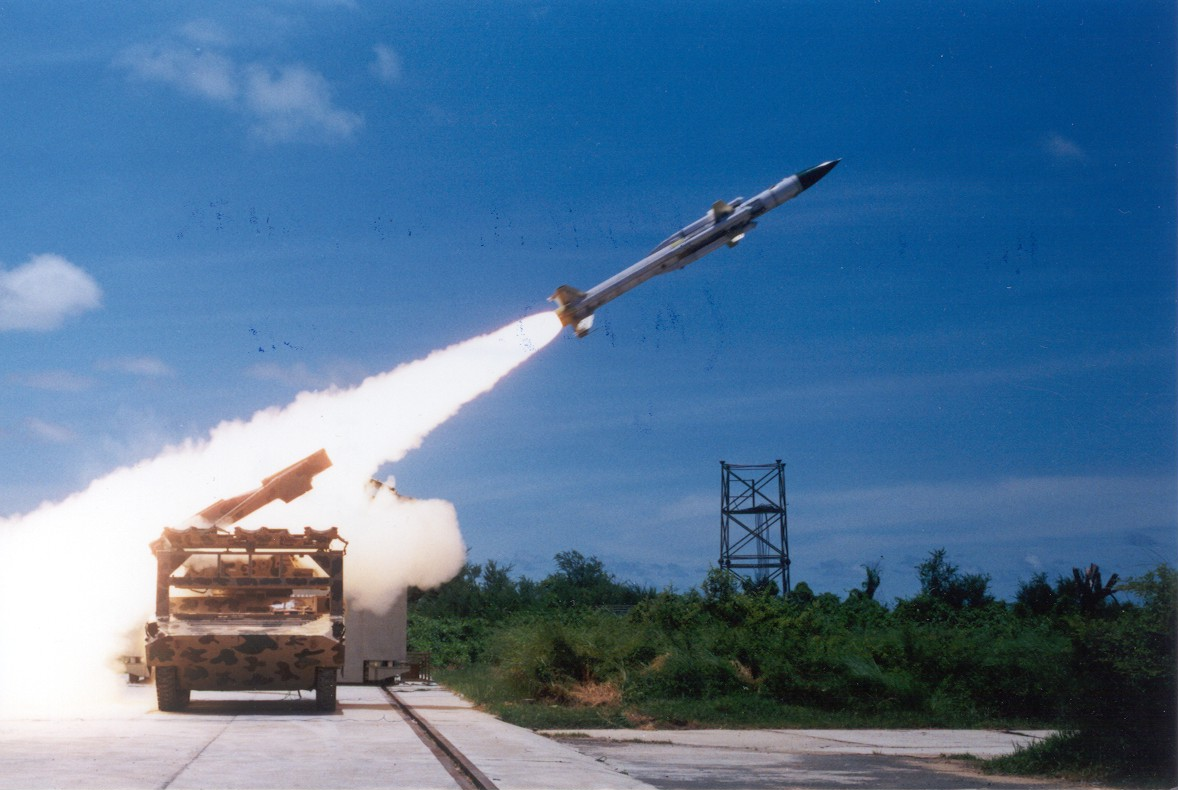
Akash Missile Launch from Integrated Test Range (ITR), Dr Abdul Kalam Island

== See also ==
- Guided missiles of India
- Indian Ballistic Missile Defence Programme
- Integrated Guided Missile Development Programme
