= G. Satheesh Reddy =

Scientific Advisor to Raksha Mantri

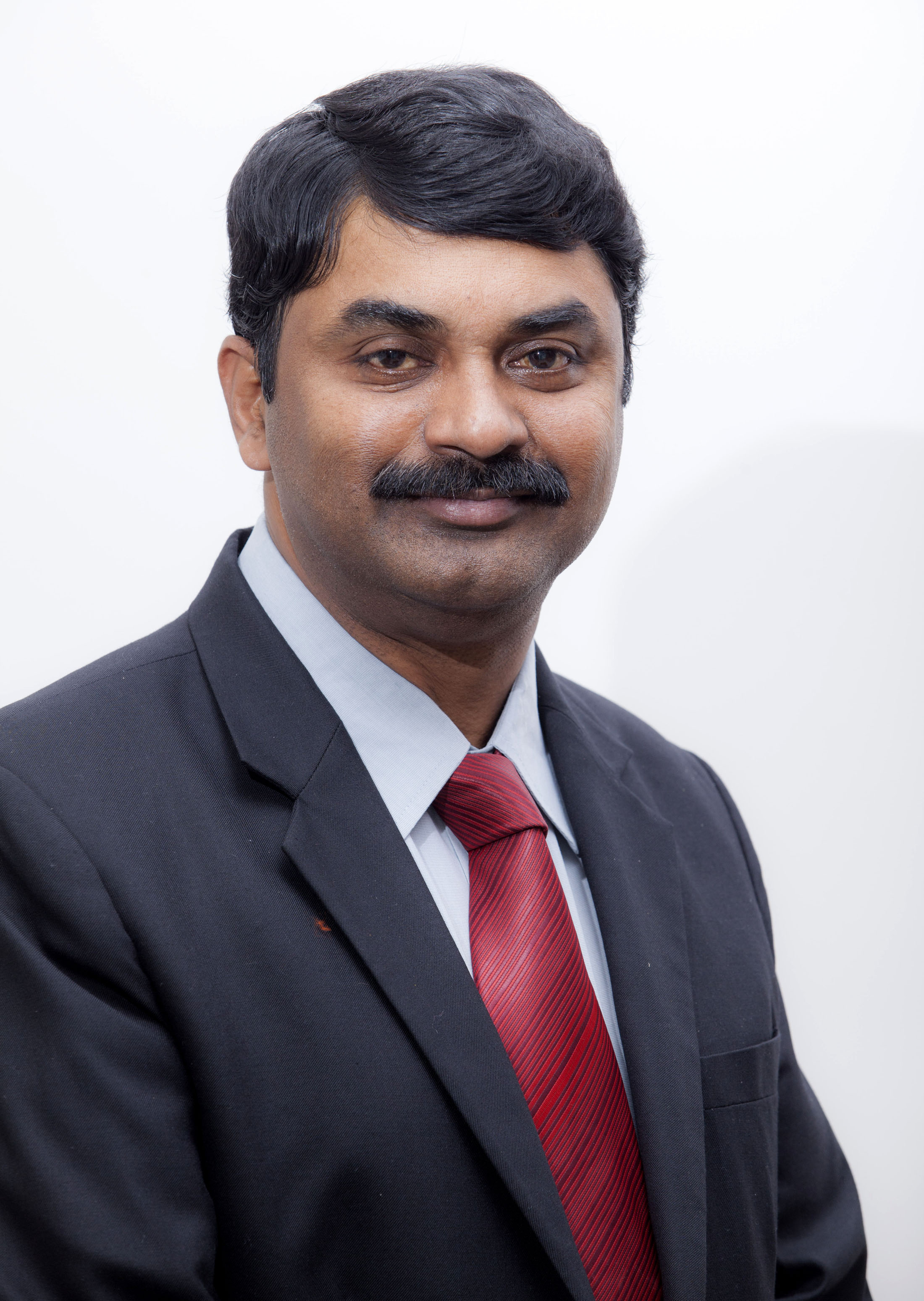

Chairman of Defence research and development organisation
- In office 2018–2022
- Preceded by: S Christopher
- Succeeded by: Samir V. Kamat

Personal details
- Born: 1 July 1963 (age 63) Mahimaluru, Atmakur, Nellore district, Andhra Pradesh
- Education: Jawaharlal Nehru Technological University, Anantapur; Jawaharlal Nehru Technological University, Hyderabad
- Occupation: Scientific Adviser to Defence Minister; Chairman, Governing Body, Aeronautical Development Agency (ADA)
- Awards: 2019 AIAA Missile Systems Award; 2015 RAeS Silver Medal; 2016 National Design Award, 2016 National Aeronautical Prize, 2015 National Systems Gold Medal, 2013 Homi J Bhabha Memorial Gold Medal

G. Satheesh Reddy (born 1 July 1963) is an Indian aerospace scientist who served as the thirteenth chairman of the Defence Research and Development Organisation (DRDO) from 2018 to 2022. He served as the chairman of the Governing Body of the Aeronautical Development Agency, and in 2015 became the 12th Scientific Adviser to the Minister of Defence (Raksha Mantri). He was appointed as the member of National Security advisory board.

== Early life and education ==
Reddy was born in Mahimaluru, Atmakur, Nellore district, Andhra Pradesh. He graduated in Electronics and Communication Engineering from Jawaharlal Nehru Technological University, Anantapur and received his M.S & PhD from Jawaharlal Nehru Technological University, Hyderabad.

== Career ==
Reddy joined Defence Research and Development Laboratory (DRDL), Hyderabad in 1986, subsequently joining Research Centre Imarat (RCI) after its formation. As Director at RCI, he led the development of IR seekers, integrated avionics modules, and other innovative systems.

First working as a navigation scientist and system manager, he eventually was elevated as a Distinguished Scientist in September 2014 and was appointed as a Scientific Adviser to the Defence Minister in May 2015.

He was also appointed as the Secretary of the Department of Defence R&D and Chairman of the Defence Research and Development Organisation of India (DRDO) in August 2018. As Director General of Missiles and Strategic Systems, he oversaw the development of missile systems like Indian Ballistic Missile Defence Programme, Nag, QRSAM, Rudram, Long Range Guided Bomb etc. He also oversaw India's first successful test of Prithvi Defence Vehicle Mark 2 Anti-Satellite (ASAT) missile (Mission Shakti). He was involved in the development of the world's longest-range gun ATAGS, anti-radiation missiles, smart air field weapons, smart bombs, and missile assisted torpedo release systems.

== Awards and recognition ==
Reddy has been induced as a fellow of the Royal Aeronautical Society, London. He has also received other awards including American Institute of Aeronautics and Astronautics (AIAA) Missile Systems Award, the Aeronautical Prize, National Systems Gold Medal, National Design Award, IEI-IEEE (USA) Award for Engineering Excellence and the Homi J Bhabha Gold Medal. In 2017, Reddy became a laureate of the Asian Scientist 100 by the Asian Scientist.
