= S. Christopher =

Indian scientist

S Christopher
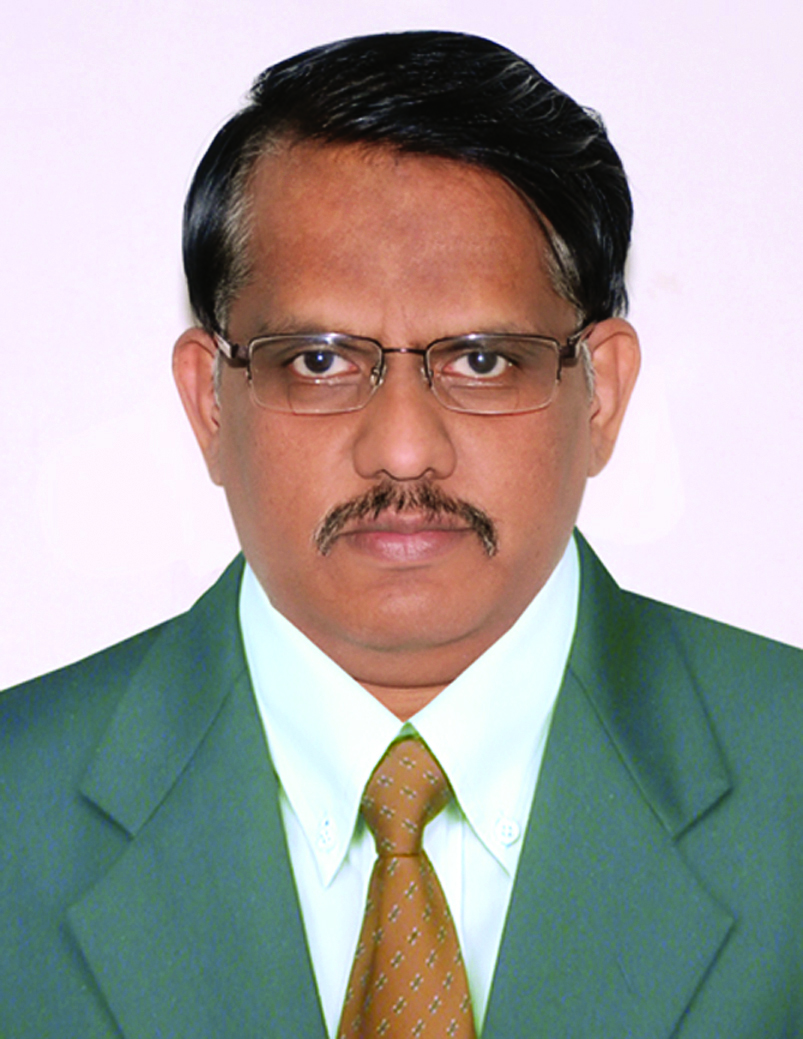

Chairman of Defence research and development organisation
- In office 2015-2018
- Preceded by: Avinash Chander (DRDO)
- Succeeded by: G. Satheesh Reddy

Personal details
- Born: Nagercoil, Tamil Nadu
- Spouse: Dr. Reeta Christopher
- Occupation: Chairman, Defence Research and Development Organisation

Selvin Christopher is an Indian scientist who served as chairman of the Defence Research and Development Organisation (DRDO). Formerly he was director of the Centre for Airborne Systems. He is also the author of various research publications, currently working as professor in Department of Electrical Sciences in IIT Madras.

== Career ==
Christopher is credited to have directed the manufacturing of India's first indigenous AEW&C system. He received various distinguished awards including the Best Defence Research and Development Organisation - Outstanding Scientist for 2012. He was appointed as chairman of the DRDO on 29 May 2015 for a two-year term. He further got extension of 1 year.

Christopher obtained his BE (Hons) in electronics & communication engineering from University of Madras and MTech in microwaves and radar engineering from IIT Kharagpur. He joined IIT Madras, as project associate in 1980, and carried out research in microwave antenna design and near-field measurement techniques. He then obtained PhD in antennae and measurement techniques from IIT Madras. Christopher is the driving force behind the induction of the Indian AEWC system.

== In popular culture ==
The character of the DRDO Chairman Brian D'Sousa played by Ivan Sylvester Rodrigues in the 2019 movie Uri: The Surgical Strike is based on S. Christopher.
