= Indian Ballistic Missile Defence Programme =

Indian military defence system, established 2000

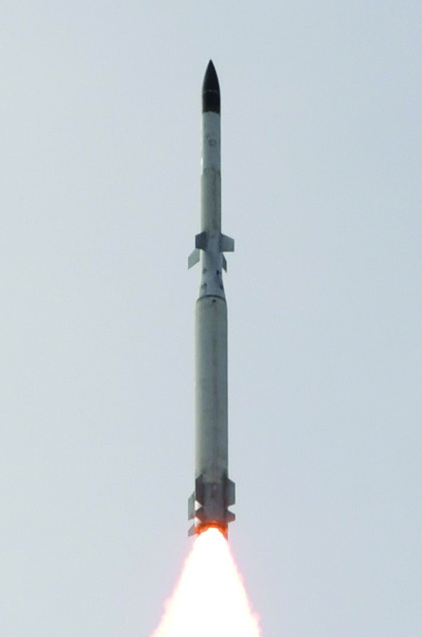
- Second phase of anti-ballistic missile defense test with AD-1 missile
- Type: Missile defense
- Place of origin: India

Service history
- In service: 2017–present
- Used by: Indian Armed Forces

Production history
- Designer: Defence Research and Development Organisation
- Manufacturer: Bharat Dynamics Limited
- Produced: Phase 1, focusing on Delhi and Mumbai, was declared ready for limited deployment and production in 2017-2018. Phase 2, targeting ICBMs, is under development.

Specifications
- Operational range: 2,000–5,000 kilometres
- Launch platform: ground-based

The Indian Ballistic Missile Defence Programme is an initiative to develop and deploy a multi-layered ballistic missile defence system to protect India from ballistic missile attacks. It was launched in 1999 after the Kargil War by the Atal Bihari Vajpayee government. Testing was carried out and continuing as of 2006, and the system was expected to be operational within four years according to the head of the country's missiles development programme, Vijay Kumar Saraswat.

Introduced in light of the ballistic missile threat from Pakistan and China, it is a double-tiered system consisting of two land and sea-based interceptor missiles, namely the Prithvi Air Defence (PAD) missile for High Altitude interception, and the Advanced Air Defence (AAD) Missile for lower altitude interception. The two-tiered shield should be able to intercept any incoming missile launched from 5,000 kilometres away. The system also includes an overlapping network of early warning and tracking radars, as well as command and control posts.

The PAD was tested in November 2006, followed by the AAD in December 2007. With the test of the PAD missile, India became the fourth country to have successfully developed an anti-ballistic missile system, after the United States, Russia, and Israel. The system has undergone several tests but system is yet to be officially commissioned.

As per reports emerged in January 2020, the first phase of BMD program is now complete. The Indian Air Force and the Defence Research and Development Organisation are awaiting for Government of India approval to install the missile shield around the national capital, which will take three to four years for installation post approval. It is one of the component of Mission Sudarshan Chakra.

== Background ==
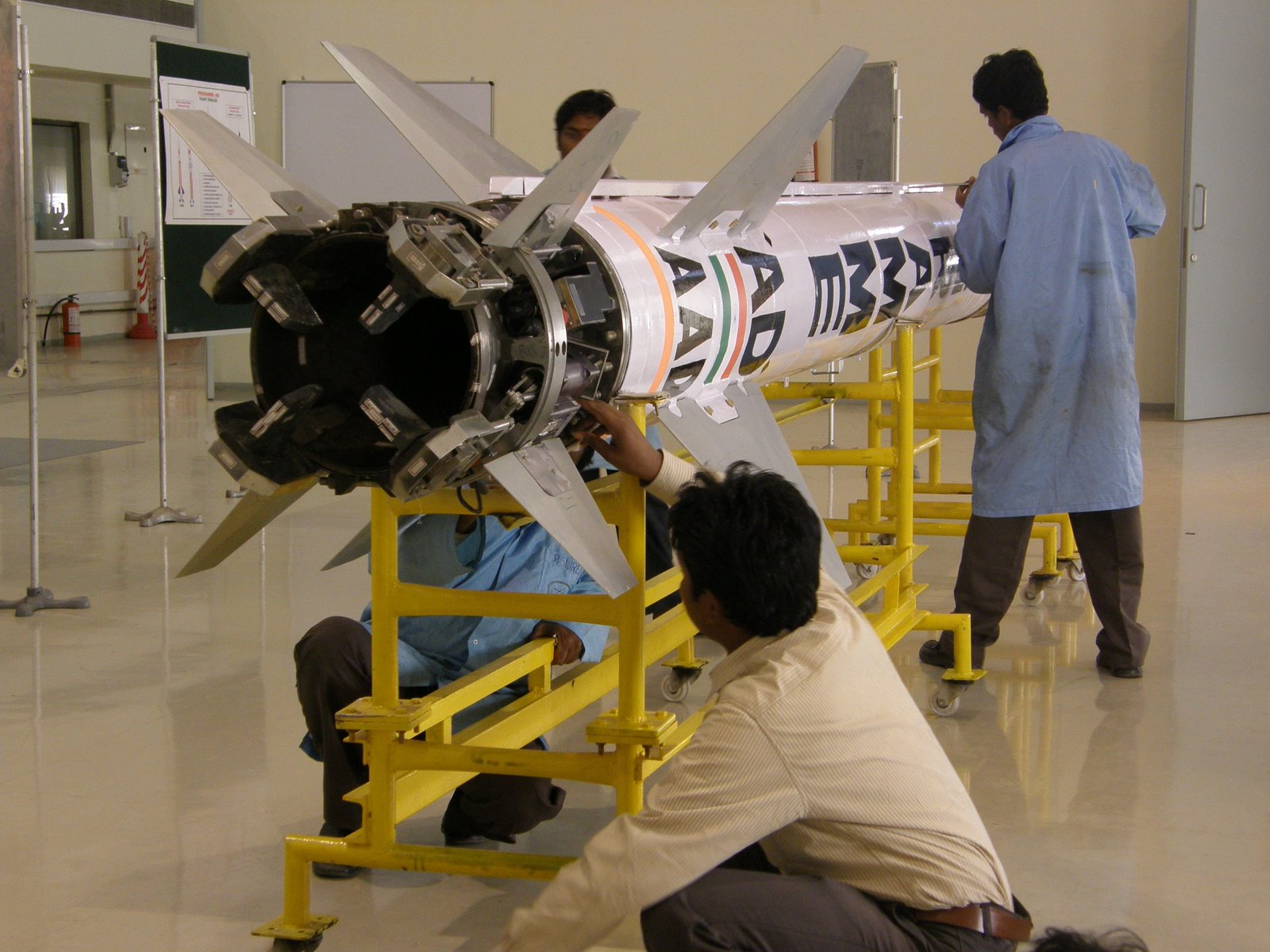
Advanced Air Defence (AAD) endo-atmospheric interceptor missile, being integrated at the Programme Air Defence ABM development facility at Research Centre Imarat. Note the Missile Jet Vanes at the end of the rocket motor. The system provides for very quick pitch over and roll control during launch.

Since the early 90s, India has faced the threat of ballistic missile attacks from Pakistan against which it has fought multiple wars in the past and also from China. With the heightening of tensions in the region, and in response to Pakistan's deployment of M-11 missiles bought from China, the Indian Government in August 1995 procured six batteries of S-300 Surface-to-air missiles to protect New Delhi and other cities. In May 1998, India for the second time (since its first test in 1974) tested nuclear weapons (see Pokhran-II), followed by Pakistan (see Chagai-I) with its first-ever nuclear test. With Pakistan's testing of nuclear weapons and missile delivery systems, this threat intensified. India has also developed and tested missile delivery systems during Integrated Guided Missile Development Programme.

In 1999, the Kargil War between India and Pakistan became the first direct conflict between two declared nuclear powers. As the war progressed, the first hint of the possible use of a nuclear weapon was on 31 May, when Pakistani foreign secretary Shamshad Ahmad made a statement warning that an escalation of the limited conflict could lead Pakistan to use "any weapon" in its arsenal. This was immediately interpreted as an obvious threat of a nuclear retaliation by Pakistan in the event of an extended war. The leader of Pakistan's senate noted that "the purpose of developing weapons becomes meaningless if they are not used when they are needed." Some experts believe that following nuclear tests in 1998, the Pakistani military was emboldened by its nuclear deterrent cover to markedly increase coercion against India.

Development of an anti-ballistic missile system began in late 1999, suggesting that India initiated the programme in light of Pakistan's eschewing of a nuclear No first use policy and heightened tensions during the Kargil War including a possibility of full-scale nuclear war. Development accelerated after Washington vetoed a bid by India to acquire the Israeli Arrow-2 interceptor in 2002.

Phase-I of the system will enable interception of missiles up to a 2,000-km range, which will be extended to 5,000-km+ range in Phase-II.

== Development ==
=== Phase 1 ===
Development of the anti-ballistic missile system began in 1999. Around 40 public and private companies were involved in the development of the systems. They include Ordnance Factory Board, Bharat Electronics Limited and Bharat Dynamics among others.

Defence Research and Development Laboratory developed the mission control software for the AAD missile. Research Centre Imarat developed navigation, electromechanical actuation systems and the active radar seeker. Advanced Systems Laboratory provided the motors, jet vanes and structures for the AAD and PAD. High Energy Materials Research Laboratory supplied the propellants for the missile. Research Centre Imarat and Programme Air Defence (PGAD) at Hyderabad are spearheading the Indian Ballistic Missile Defence Programme.

By April 2019, the Phase-1 of the program was completed.

=== Phase 2 ===
Two new anti ballistic missiles that can intercept IRBMs and ICBMs are being developed. These high speed missiles (AD-1 and AD-2) are being developed to intercept ballistic missiles with a range of around 5,000 km (3,100 mi). The new missile will be similar to the missile deployed by Terminal High Altitude Area Defense. These missiles will travel at hypersonic speeds and will require radars with scan capability of over 1,500 km (930 mi) to successfully intercept the target. On 6 May 2012, Dr. V. K. Saraswat confirmed the completion of Phase-I and added that Phase-II was planned to be completed by 2016 to protect against missiles having range up to 5,000 km, and intercept missiles which are capable of hypersonic speeds above Mach 5.

India is also planning to develop a laser-based weapon system as part of its defence to intercept and destroy missiles soon after they are launched towards the country. DRDO's Air Defence Programme Director V. K. Saraswat says its ideal to destroy a ballistic missile carrying nuclear or conventional warheads in its boost phase. Saraswat further added that it will take another 10–15 years for the premier defence research institute to make it usable on the ground.

As per reports in February 2026, reports indicated that India will enhance technical cooperation with Israel on ballistic missile defence. The Phase 2 program was completed in June 2026 with the testing of AD-1 and AD-2 interceptors that destroyed targets in both endo-atmospheric and exo-atmospheric flight.

== Missiles ==
=== Phase 1 ===
The two-tiered BMD System consisted of the PAD, which will intercept missiles at exo-atmospheric altitudes of 50–80 km (31–50 mi) and the AAD missile for interception at endo-atmospheric altitudes of up to 30 km (19 mi). The deployed system would consist of many launch vehicles, radars, Launch Control Centres (LCC) and the Mission Control Centre (MCC). All these are geographically distributed and connected by a secure communication network.

The MCC is the software intensive component of the ballistic missile defence system. It receives information from various sources such as radars and satellites which is then processed by ten computers which run simultaneously. The MCC is connected to all other elements of the defence through a WAN. The MCC performs target classifications and assignment as well as kill assessments. It also acts as a decision support system for the commander. It can also decide the number of interceptors required for the target for an assured kill probability. After performing all these functions, the MCC assigns the target to the LCC of a launch battery. The LCC starts computing the time to launch the interceptor based upon information received from a radar based on the speed, altitude and flight path of the target. The LCC prepares the missile for launch in real time and carries out ground guidance computation.

After the interceptor is launched, it is provided target information from the radar through a datalink. When the interceptors close onto the target missile, it activates the radar seeker to search for the target missile and guides itself to intercept the target. Multiple PAD and AAD interceptors can be launched against a target for high kill probability.

==== Prithvi Air Defence ====
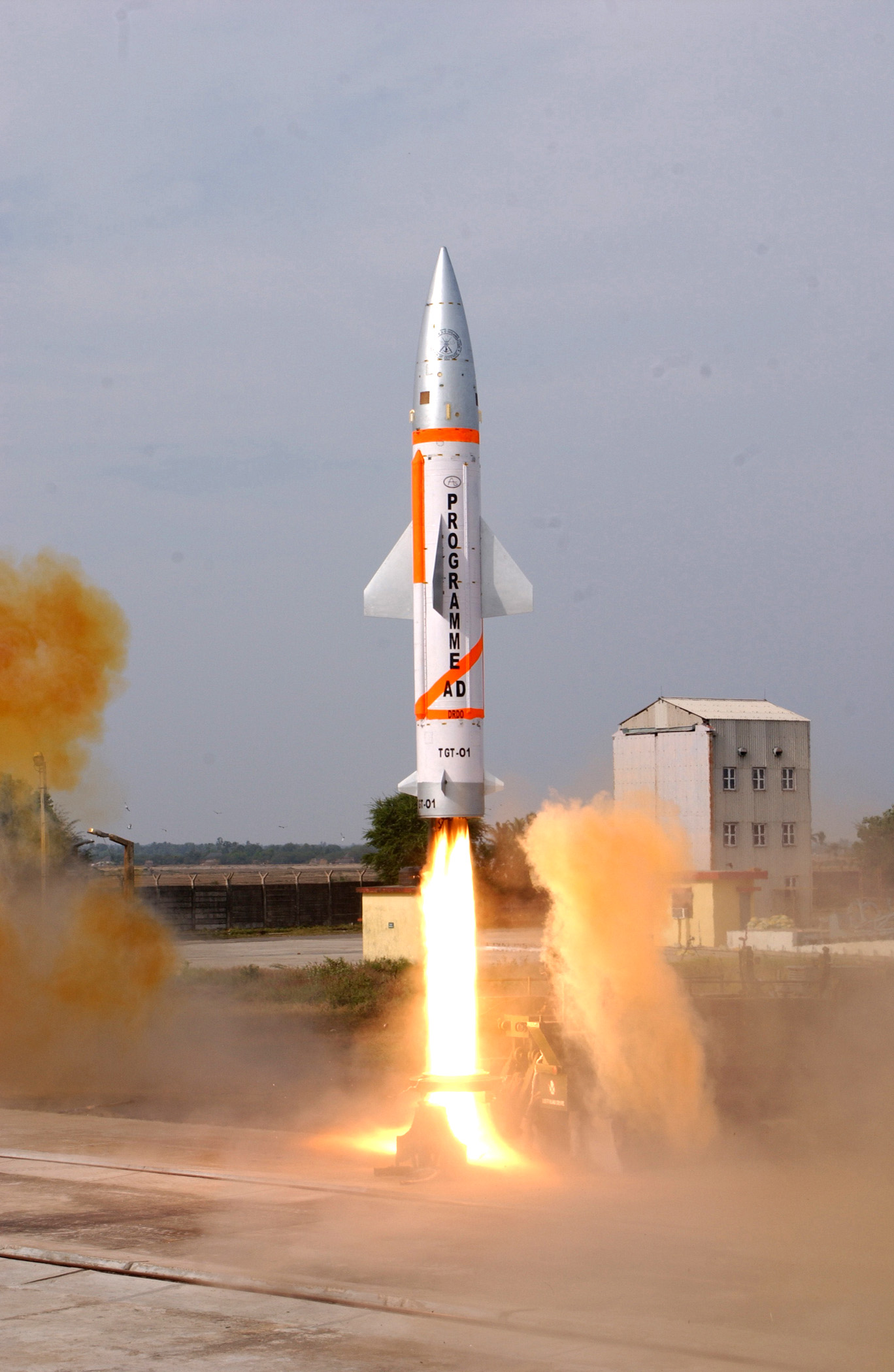
Prithvi Air Defence (PAD) missile test on 6 December 2007.

The Prithvi Air Defence (PAD), also known as Pradyumna Ballistic Missile Interceptor is an anti-ballistic missile developed to intercept incoming ballistic missiles outside the atmosphere (exo-atmospheric). Based on the Prithvi missile, PAD is a two-stage missile with a maximum interception altitude of 80 km (50 mi). The first stage is a Solid fuelled motor while the second stage is Liquid fuelled. It has manoeuvre thrusters which can generate a lateral acceleration of more than 5 gs at 50 km (31 mi) altitude. Guidance is provided by an internal navigation system with mid-course updates from LRTR and active radar homing in the terminal phase. PAD has capability to engage the 3,000 km (1,900 mi) class of ballistic missiles at a speed of Mach 5. PAD is fast enough to hit medium-range ballistic missiles and intermediate-range ballistic missiles.

LRTR is the target acquisition and fire control radar for the PAD missile. It is an active phased array radar having the capability to track 200 targets at a range of 1,500 km (930 mi). The PAD missile has also been called Pradyumna.

Further development led to the improvement of the interception range from 50 to 80 km (31 to 50 mi). The improved missile will utilise a gimbaled directional warhead, a technology also used by Israel, the US and Russia. This technology allows for a smaller warhead to destroy the target missile.

The second stage of the PAD uses liquid rocket propellant, which corrodes fuel tanks when stored for long, the PAD could not be on standby 24×7. Instead, it would need to be filled up during a period of crisis in anticipation of trouble. This is less than optimal for a weapon intended to defend against an attack at any moment.

Prithvi Air Defence Exercise

The PADE (Prithvi Air Defence Exercise) was conducted in November 2006 in which a PAD missile successfully intercepted a modified Prithvi-II Missile at an altitude of 50 km (31 mi). The Prithvi-II ballistic missile was modified successfully to mimic the trajectory of M-11 missiles.

The DRDO plans to test the anti-ballistic shield against missiles with a range of 3,000 km (1,900 mi). The test will be conducted with a modified Prithvi missile launched from a naval ship and the anti-ballistic missile launched from Abdul Kalam Island. The interception of the target missile will take place at approximately 80 km (50 mi) altitude.

On 6 March 2009 the DRDO carried out a second successful test of the PAD interceptor missile. The target used was a ship launched Dhanush missile which followed the trajectory of a missile with range of a 1,500 km (930 mi). The target was tracked by Swordfish (LRTR) radar and destroyed by the PAD at 75 km (47 mi) altitude.

On 6 March 2011 DRDO successfully test-fired an interceptor missile from the Advanced Air Defence (AAD) system which destroyed a 'hostile' target ballistic missile, a modified Prithvi, at an altitude of 16 km over the Bay of Bengal. The Advanced Air Defence (AAD) missile positioned at Abdul Kalam Island, about 70 km across sea from Chandipur, received signals from tracking radars installed along the coastline and travelled through the sky at a speed of Mach 4.5 to destroy it.

==== Advanced Air Defence (AAD) ====
The Advanced Air Defence (AAD) also known as Ashwin Ballistic Missile Interceptor is an anti-ballistic missile designed to intercept incoming ballistic missiles in the endo-atmosphere at an altitude of 40 km (25 mi). The AAD is a single-stage, solid-fuelled missile with siliconised carbon jet vanes. Guidance is similar to that of PAD with indigenous radio frequency seeker. It supports inertial navigation system (INS), mid-course updates from ground-based radar and active radar homing in the terminal phase. It is 7.5 m (25 ft) tall, weighs around 1.2 t (1.2 long tons; 1.3 short tons) and a diameter of less than 0.5 m (1 ft 8 in).

The land-based launcher of the missile system is manufactured by Tata Advanced Systems and was jointly developed by TASL and DRDO. The launcher is based on a 12×12 truck chassis. Each launcher carries 6 missiles in canisterised form and can launch them in Single or Salvo Mode as per situation. The launcher also includes Launch Control System and power generation system. The launcher, termed as Advanced Air Defence Mobile Launcher System (AAD MLS) is equipped with a dual redundant communication link to the Launch Control Complex (LCC) and has an RF Wireless Link and a Physical Link.

===== Trials =====
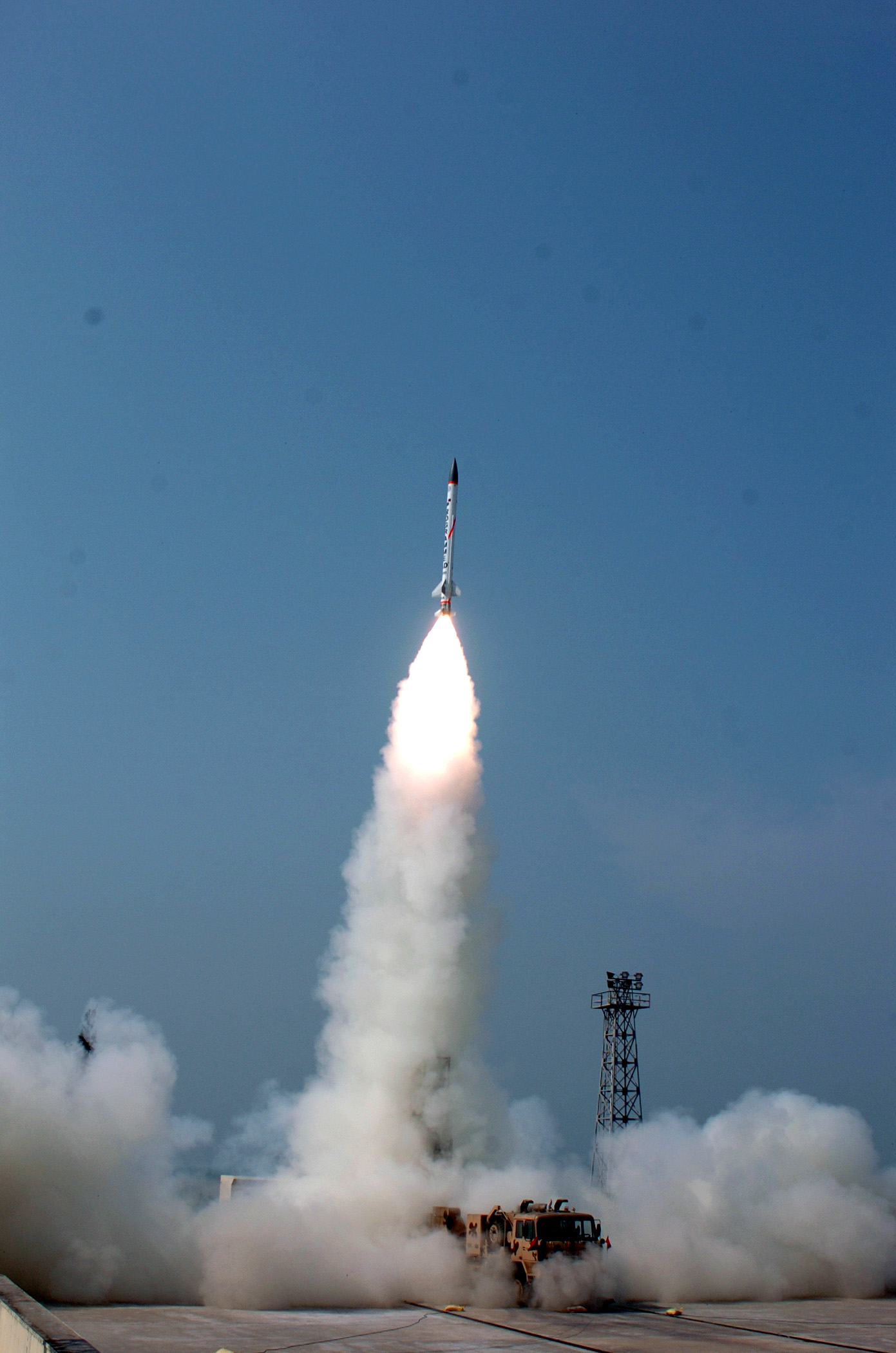
Advanced Air Defence (AAD) missile test on 6 December 2007 intercepted incoming missile at an altitude of 15 km.

- On 6 December 2007, AAD successfully intercepted a modified Prithvi-II missile acting as an incoming ballistic missile enemy target. The endo-atmospheric interception was carried out at an altitude of 15 km (9.3 mi). The interceptor and all the elements performed in a copy book fashion validating the endo-atmospheric layer of the defence system. The launch was also shown through a video link at a control room of DRDO Bhawan, in Delhi. The sequence of events of the test was as follows. At 11 am the Prithvi (missile) lifted off from Launch Complex III of Integrated Test Range at Chandipur, Odisha. Radars at Konark, Paradip detected the missile and were continuously tracking it. The target information was sent to MCC for further processing. MCC classified the target, calculated the trajectory of the missile and assigned the target to an AAD battery located on Abdul Kalam Island (Abdul Kalam Island), 70 km (43 mi) across the sea from Chandipur. The AAD was launched when the Prithvi reached an apogee of 110 km (68 mi). The AAD, with the help of midcourse updates and its terminal seeker, manoeuvred itself towards the target. The AAD made a direct hit at an altitude of 15 km (9.3 mi) and at a speed of Mach 4. Radars detected formation of a large number of tracks, signifying that the target had broken into multiple pieces. The thermal cameras located on Abdul Kalam Island also picked up the direct hit through thermal images.
- On 26 July 2010, AAD was successfully test-fired from the ITR at Abdul Kalam Island off the Odisha's east coast.
- On 6 March 2011, India launched its indigenously developed interceptor missile from the Odisha coast. India successfully test-fired its interceptor missile which destroyed a 'hostile' target ballistic missile, a modified Prithvi, at an altitude of 16 km over the Bay of Bengal. The interceptor, Advanced Air Defence (AAD) missile positioned at Abdul Kalam Island, about 70 km across sea from Chandipur, received signals from tracking radars installed along the coastline and travelled through the sky at a speed of Mach 5 to destroy it. As the trial was aimed at achieving the desired result with precision, the interceptor missile had its own mobile launcher, secure data link for interception, independent tracking and homing capabilities and sophisticated radars. "It was a fantastic launch. The trial, conducted from two launch sites of ITR off Orissa coast for developing a full fledged multi-layer Ballistic Missile Defence (BMD) system, was fully successful", he said.
- On 10 February 2012, the AAD was again successfully test-fired from Abdul Kalam Island off the state coast near Dhamra in Bhadrak district, about 170 km from Bhubaneswar.
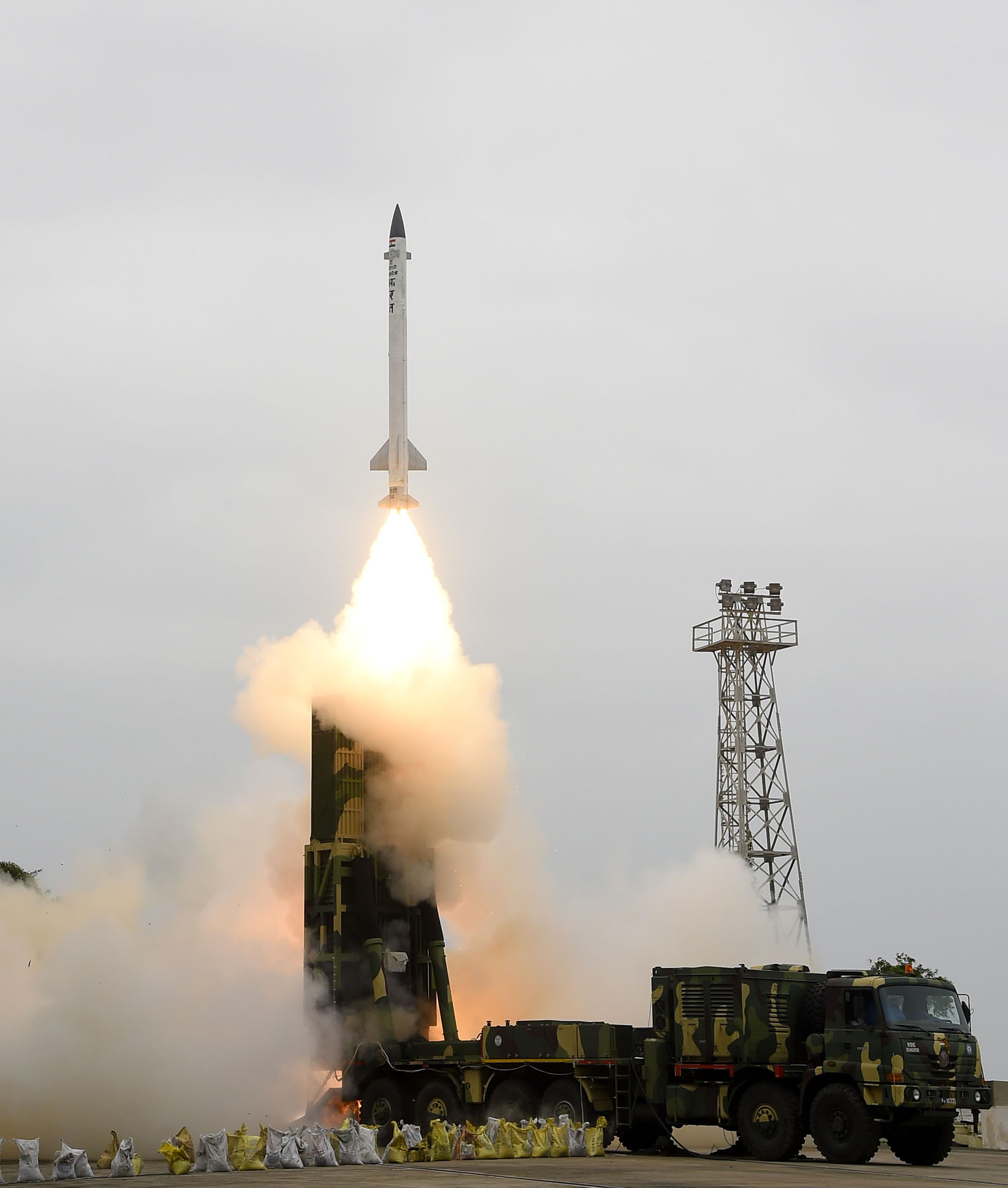
  Advanced Air Defence (AAD) missile test on 28 December 2017.
- On 23 November 2012, India again successfully testfired its home-made supersonic Advanced Air Defence (AAD) interceptor missile from a defence base off the coast of the eastern state of Odisha. "The test-firing was part of India's efforts to create a missile defence shield against incoming enemy missiles. The AAD interceptor missile, which was fired from the Abdul Kalam Island off the Odishan coast, successfully destroyed, in mid-air, an incoming ballistic missile launched from the ITR in Chandipur, about 70 km from the Abdul Kalam Island."
- On 6 April 2015 an improved AAD was tested. The missile was launched from a canister for the first time and the composite rocket motor fired successfully. The missile had improvements over the previous version in terms of bigger warhead, improved maneuverability and reduced miss-distance. As the missile was in the air one of the sub systems malfunctioned, making it veer away from the flight path resulting in the failure of the mission. Another test was planned to take place within 30–45 days after detecting and resolving the problem.
- On 22 November 2015, an upgraded version of AAD (Advanced Air Defence) was successfully tested. The anti-ballistic missile took off at 9.40 a.m. from the A.P.J. Abdul Kalam (Wheeler) Island as soon after it received the command to waylay and destroy an incoming electronically simulated target missile. Conditions similar to the launch of a target missile from Balasore were simulated electronically and upon receiving its coordinates, the interceptor missile, travelling at supersonic speed, engaged and destroyed the "virtual target" in mid-flight.
- On 15 May 2016, DRDO officially reported that AAD intercepted and destroyed a Prithvi ballistic missile fired from a ship.
- On 28 December 2017, DRDO successfully carried out an AAD missile test in which an incoming modified Prithvi ballistic missile was intercepted and destroyed with a direct hit.
- On 3 August 2018, a successful test was carried out from Abdul Kalam Island where one of multiple incoming targets simulating 1,500 km class ballistic missiles was destroyed.

===== Sea-based interception =====
The DRDO Floating Test Range is expected to assist in the development of the Phase 2. This vessel INS Anvesh (A41) was set to undergo sea trials in September 2021. On 21 April 2023, DRDO and the Indian Navy conducted the maiden flight trial of the sea-based interceptor missile for naval ballistic missile defence capability. The Newer versions of the Ashwin system, namely the AD-1 and AD-2 interceptors are planned to be deployed on Indian Naval vessels by 2027.

==== Prithvi Defence Vehicle ====
Prithvi Defence Vehicle (PDV) is an anti-ballistic missile designed to intercept incoming ballistic missiles in the exo-atmosphere at an altitude from 50 km (31 mi) to 180 km (110 mi). The PDV is a two-stage missile and both the stages are powered by solid propellants. It has an innovative system for controlling the vehicle at an altitude of more than 180 km. The PDV is intended to replace the existing PAD in the PAD/AAD combination. It has a IIR seeker for its kill vehicle as well. The PDV will replace the PAD with a far more capable missile and will complete Phase 1 of the BMD system, allowing it to be operational by 2013. Whereupon Phase 2 development will take over for protection against missiles of the 5,000 km (3,100 mi) range class. The first test flight of the missile was expected in 2010. The PDV is designed to take out target missiles at altitudes above 150 km (93 mi).

DRDO conducted three tests of the PDV — on 27 April 2014, 11 February 2017 and 12 February 2019, respectively.

==== Prithvi Defence Vehicle Mark 2 ====
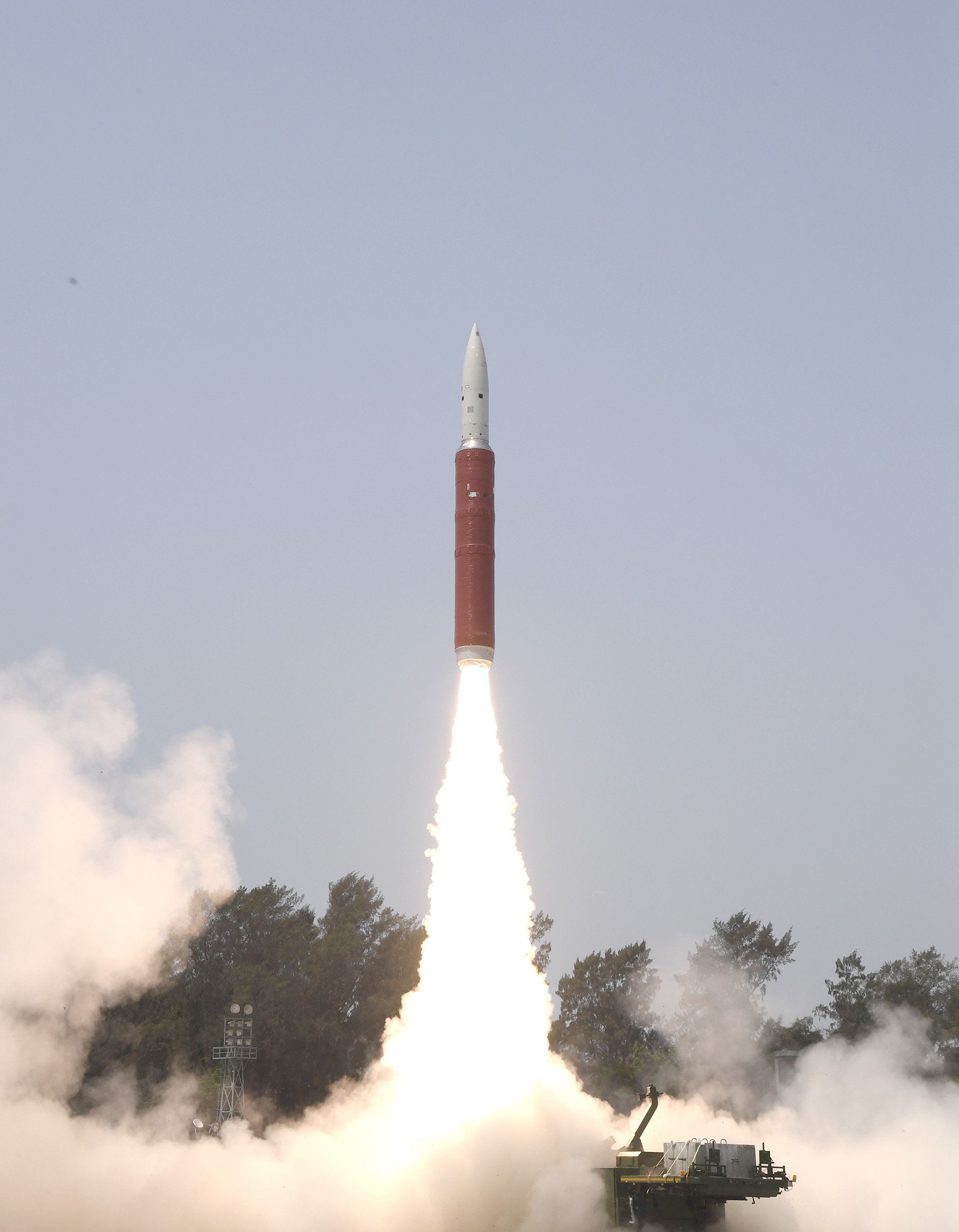
PDV Mk-2/XSV-1 interceptor launched to target Microsat-R

In March 2019, India conducted an ASAT test. India officially confirmed that this missile was a Ballistic Missile Defence interceptor. PDV Mk-2 is a 13 m tall, 18.87 tons, three stage missile. Solid rocket motors with flexible nozzles constituted the first two stages, with the Kill Vehicle being the third stage. According to a report published on the official DRDO website, the missile has the capability to shoot down targets moving at 10 km per second in orbits as high as 1,200 km. The accuracy of the missile is less than 10 cm

It has been suggested that this missile may have the capability of exo-atmospheric interception of intercontinental ballistic missiles. A report published on the official DRDO website suggested the same. At DefExpo 2020, DRDO confirmed that the PDV Mk-2 was ready for limited series production. The solid rocket booster used is a derivative of the technology first developed for the Sagarika missile. This missile was not derived from the Prithvi ballistic missile.

=== Phase 2 ===
Under the Phase 2 program, the AD-1 interceptor was designed to neutralize medium-range-class ballistic missiles at ranges of 1,000-3,000 km, whereas AD-2 was meant to intercept intermediate-range-class ballistic missiles at ranges of 3,000-5,500 km. According to Samir V. Kamat, the AD-1 can intercept an incoming missile with a range of 5,000 km.

==== AD-1 missile ====
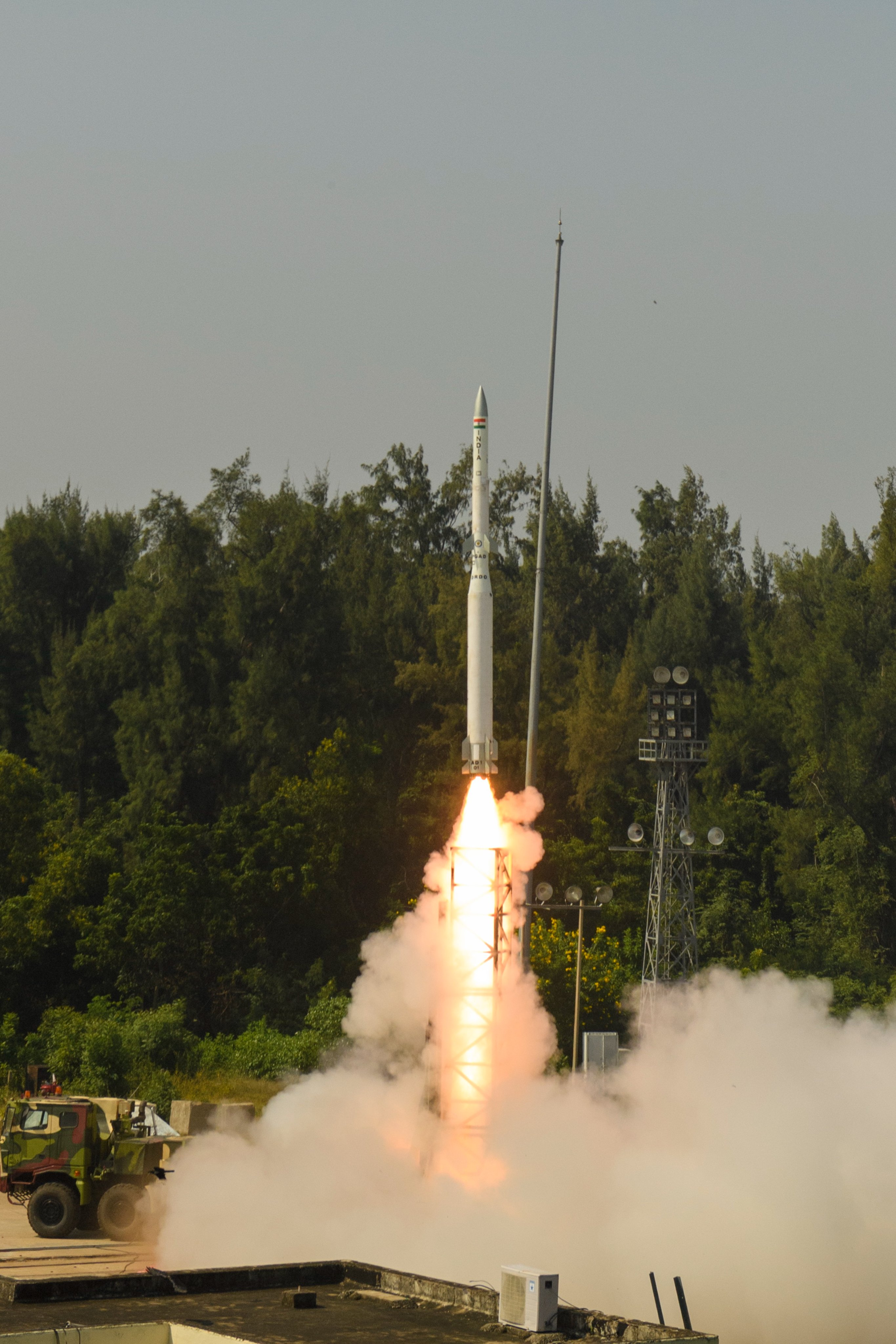
AD-1 missile test on 2 November 2022.

The AD-1 interceptor missile is developed for both low exo-atmospheric and endo-atmospheric interception roles and can be used against long range ballistic missiles. It is a two-stage missile and powered by solid propellants. The missile boasts an advanced but indigenous missile control system. It has a range of 1,500 km to 3,000 km along with a large kill altitude bracket. It has the capability to neutralise any nuclear-capable ballistic missile with a range of about 5,000 km.

==== AD-2 missile ====
The AD-2 missile is in the development phase with a maximum range of more than 5,000 km capable of intercepting intermediate-range ballistic missile and intercontinental ballistic missile with MIRV warhead.

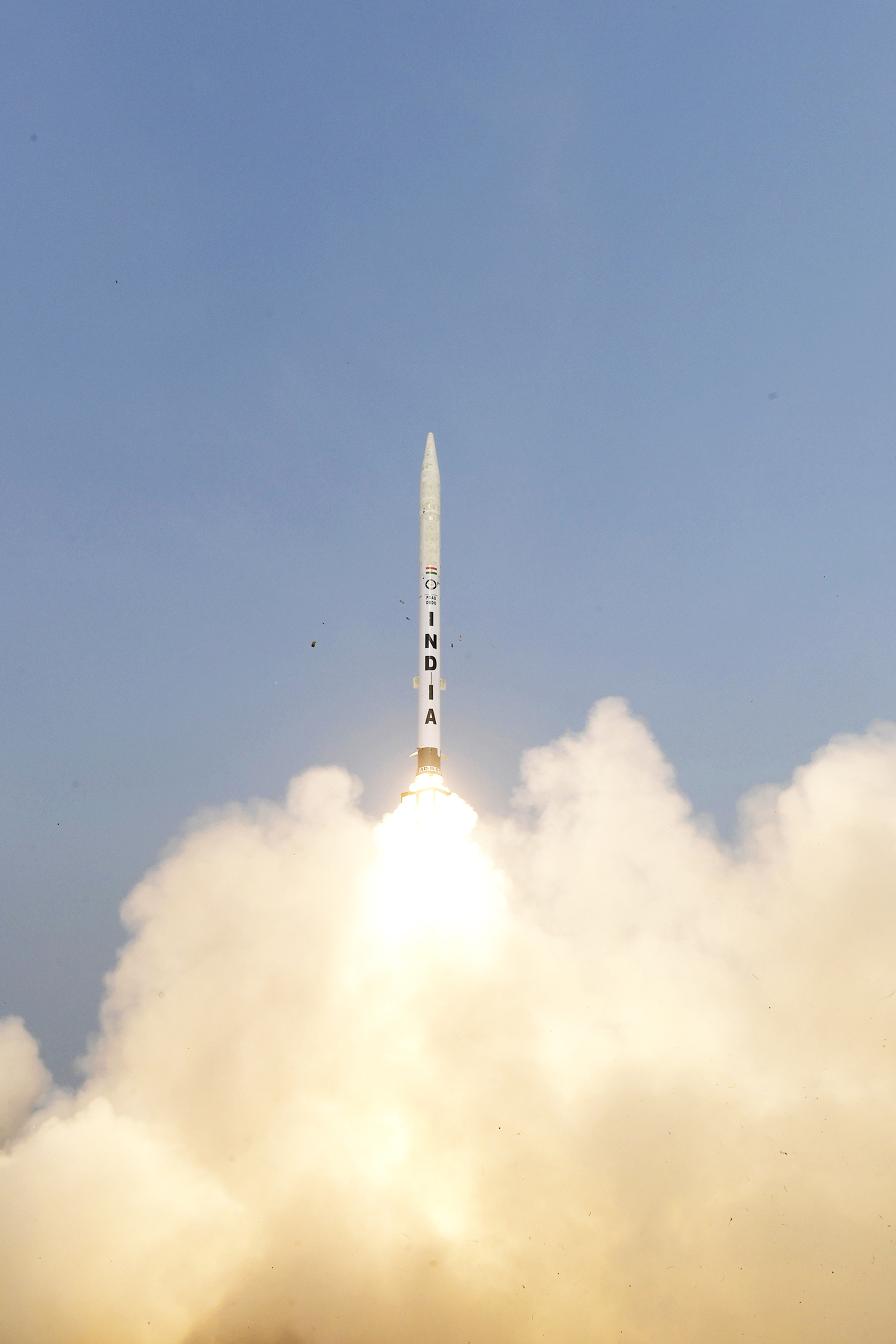
AD-2 missile test in June 2026.

==== Trials ====
- On 2 November 2022, the maiden successful test of the AD-1 Phase-II missile was conducted by DRDO. The test witnessed the participation of all BMD weapon system elements placed in different locations. The test was successful and all sub systems performed satisfactorily.
- On 24 July 2024, DRDO conducted another successful flight test of the Phase-II Ballistic Missile Defence System. At 1620 hours, the target missile was fired from Launch Complex-IV Dhamra in an attempt to simulate an adversary missile. Weapon system radars stationed on land and at sea spotted the target missile, activating the AD-1 Interceptor system. At 1624 hours, the AD-1 endo-atmospheric missile was fired from the ITR Launch Complex-III Chandipur. The entire network-centric weapon system, which includes interceptor missile, mission control center (MCC), low latency communication system, and long range sensors, were validated during the test.
- On 10 and 11 June 2026, DRDO conducted two consecutive flight tests of its multi-layered Ballistic Missile Defence (BMD) missiles. The interceptor missiles successfully intercepted their respective targets. These tests proved the capability of the BMD System to engage intercontinental ballistic missile (ICBM)-class threats.

=== Phase 3 ===
Reports in January 2026, suggested that India has begun the development of two additional missile interceptors under the third phase of Indian Ballistic Missile Defence Programme. The missiles will be deployed to intercept hypersonic weapons, multiple independently re-entry vehicles (MIRV) and non-ballistic atmospheric entry vehicles. The phase 3 missiles include Advanced Defence — Anti-Missile (AD-AM) and Advanced Defence — Anti-Hypersonic (AD-AH). While the former is meant to target hypersonic cruise missiles, the latter will be designed to engage hypersonic glide vehicles. The missiles will be equipped with kinetic warhead. The missiles are currently in advanced stages of development with maiden flight trials expected in early 2030s. The wind tunnel models of the kinetic warheads were showcased in 2024-end at DRDO's Hyderabad facility.

== Specifications ==
	Prithvi Air Defence (or Pradyumna)	Advanced Air Defence (or Ashwin)	Prithvi Defence Vehicle	Prithvi Defence Vehicle Mk2	AD-1	AD-2
Image						
Altitude Type	Exo-atmospheric	Endo-atmospheric	Exo-atmospheric	Exo-atmospheric	Endo-atmospheric and low exo-atmospheric	High exo-atmospheric
Target	MRBM and IRBM	MRBM	MRBM and IRBM	Satellite	MRBM and IRBM	IRBM and ICBM
Designer	Defence Research and Development Organisation					
Manufacturer	Bharat Dynamics Limited					
Warhead	Pre-fragmented warhead	Pre-fragmented warhead				
Warhead weight	40 kg (88 lb)	80 kg (180 lb)				
Detonation mechanism	Proximity fuze	Hit-to-kill				
Engine	Two stage with gas thruster	Single stage	Two stage rocket motor	Two stage rocket motor + kinetic kill vehicle	Two stage	
Propellant	First stage: Liquid fuel + oxidiser Second stage: Solid fuel	Solid fuel				
Range	300 km (190 mi) - 5,000 km (3,100 mi)	200 km (120 mi)	5,000 km (3,100 mi)	5,000 km (3,100 mi)	1,000 km (620 mi) - 3,000 km (1,900 mi)	3,000 km (1,900 mi) - 5,500 km (3,400 mi)
Interception Altitude	80 km (50 mi)	40 km (25 mi)	50 km (31 mi) to 180 km (110 mi)	>1,200 km (750 mi)		
Mid-course Guidance	INS + ground-based mid-course correction	INS + mid-course update	RLG-INS + redundant micro-INS			
Terminal Guidance	ARH	ARH	IIR homing			
Maximum speed	Mach 5	Mach 4.5		Mach 8-10	Mach 6.5	
Launcher	BEML-Tatra TEL 8×8	BEML-Tatra TEL 8×8, INS Anvesh	TEL	TEL	TEL (6 missiles); planned	TEL (2 missiles); planned
First test date	November 2006	December 2007	April 2014	March 2019	November 2022	
Most recent test	March 2011	April 2023	February 2019	March 2019	July 2026	June 2026
Number of tests	3	11	3	1	2–3	1–2
Status	Being deployed	Being deployed	In production	Flight trials	Flight trials	Flight trials

== Swordfish LRTR ==
Swordfish is the target acquisition and fire control radar for the BMD system. The Long Range Tracking Radar (LRTR) currently has a range of 600 km (370 mi) to 800 km (500 mi) and can spot objects as small as a cricket ball. The DRDO plans to upgrade the capacity of Swordfish to 1,500 km by 2017.

=== Super Swordfish ===
As per the Ministry of Defence, two units of VLRTR systems were accorded by the Union government under a memorandum of understanding between the National Technical Research Organisation and the IAF for the Indian Ballistic Missile Defence Programme. First unit was raised in 2017 and the system is operational.

== Deployment ==
According to scientist V K Saraswat of the DRDO, the missiles will work in tandem to ensure a hit probability of 99.8 percent. On 6 May 2012, Dr V K Saraswat confirmed that Phase-I was complete and can be deployed to protect two Indian cities at a short notice. He also added that Phase-I was comparable with the PAC-3 system. New Delhi, the national capital, and Mumbai were selected for the ballistic missile defence shield. After successful implementation in Delhi and Mumbai, the system will be used to cover other major cities in the country. This shield can destroy incoming ballistic missiles launched from as far as 2,500 km (1,600 mi) away. When the Phase II is completed and PDV is developed, the two anti-ballistic missiles can intercept targets from up to 5,000 km (3,100 mi) both at exo and endo-atmospheric (inside the atmosphere) regions.

In August 2017, the government cleared the allocation of 850 hectares of land in Alwar district and 350 hectares in Pali district of Rajasthan for setting up radars to track missiles to the DRDO.

== Cruise missile defence ==
Defending against an attack by a cruise missile, on the other hand, is similar to tackling a low-flying crewed aircraft and hence most methods of aircraft defence can be used for a cruise missile defence system.

In order to ward off the threats of nuke-tipped cruise missile attack India has a new missile defence programme which will be focused solely on intercepting cruise missiles. The technological breakthrough has been created with an Advanced Air Defence missile (AAD). DRDO Chief, Dr V K Saraswat stated in an Interview "Our studies have indicated that this AAD will be able to handle a cruise missile intercept".

Furthermore, India is acquiring airborne radars like EL/W-2090 AWACS to ensure detection of cruise missiles in order to stay on top of the threat.

Barak-8 is a long-range anti-air and anti-missile naval defence system developed jointly by Israel Aerospace Industries and the DRDO. The Indian Army inducted a variant of Barak 8 missile to meet its requirement for a medium-range surface-to-air air defence missile. The naval version of this missile has the capability to intercept incoming enemy cruise missiles and combat jets targeting its warships at sea. It would also be inducted into the Indian Air Force, followed by the Army. India has a joint venture for this missile with Israel. Recently developed, India's Akash missile defence system also has the capability to "neutralise aerial targets like fighter jets, cruise missiles and air-to-surface missiles".

Project Kusha is an Indian long-range mobile surface-to- air missile defence system under development by the DRDO. The missile system will have a range of 250 km against fighter jets, 350 km against cruise missiles, sea skimming anti-ship missiles, AWACS and mid air refuelers and will be capable of bringing down ballistic missiles and stealth fighters in the terminal stage. The naval version of the missile might be also developed to supplement the LR-SAM missile in the Indian Navy.

On 17 November 2010, an interview with Rafael's Vice President Lova Drori confirmed that the David's Sling system has been offered to the Indian Armed Forces.

== Reactions to testing ==
=== International ===
- Pakistan – Following the successful test on 15 May 2016, Pakistan on 20 May 2016 voiced concerns over India's test-fire of supersonic interceptor missile and said it would "take all necessary measures to augment the country's defense capabilities".
  - In 2017, Pakistan claimed that it tested the MIRV, nuclear-capable ballistic missile, Ababeel, in response to the Indian Ballistic Missile Defence system.
- United States – According to US Deputy Defence Secretary Ashton Carter, there is a potential for co-operation with India to develop a Ballistic Missile Defence (BMD) shield.

"That is an important potential area for our future cooperation", Carter said while on his visit to India in July 2012.

== Export ==
On 18 December 2023, Zee Business revealed that, as part of a government-to-government agreement, Armenia purchased 15 AAD systems and Akash missile systems from Bharat Dynamics Limited. The transaction was valued at about ₹5,000 crore to ₹6,000 crore.

== See also ==
- Integrated Guided Missile Development Programme
- List of Indian military missiles
- Defence Research and Development Organisation - the agency involved in the development of the ABM systems.
- Defence Space Agency
- Mission Sudarshan Chakra - proposed multi-layer defense architecture.

Other nations

- United States national missile defense
- Golden Dome - proposed multi-layer defense system for the United States
- Strategic Defense Initiative - U.S. military defense program (1984–1993)

General concepts

- Anti-ballistic missile
- Comparison of anti-ballistic missile systems
- Anti-satellite weapon
- Militarisation of space
- Outer Space Treaty
