= V. K. Saraswat =

Indian scientist (born 1949)

Vijay Kumar Saraswat
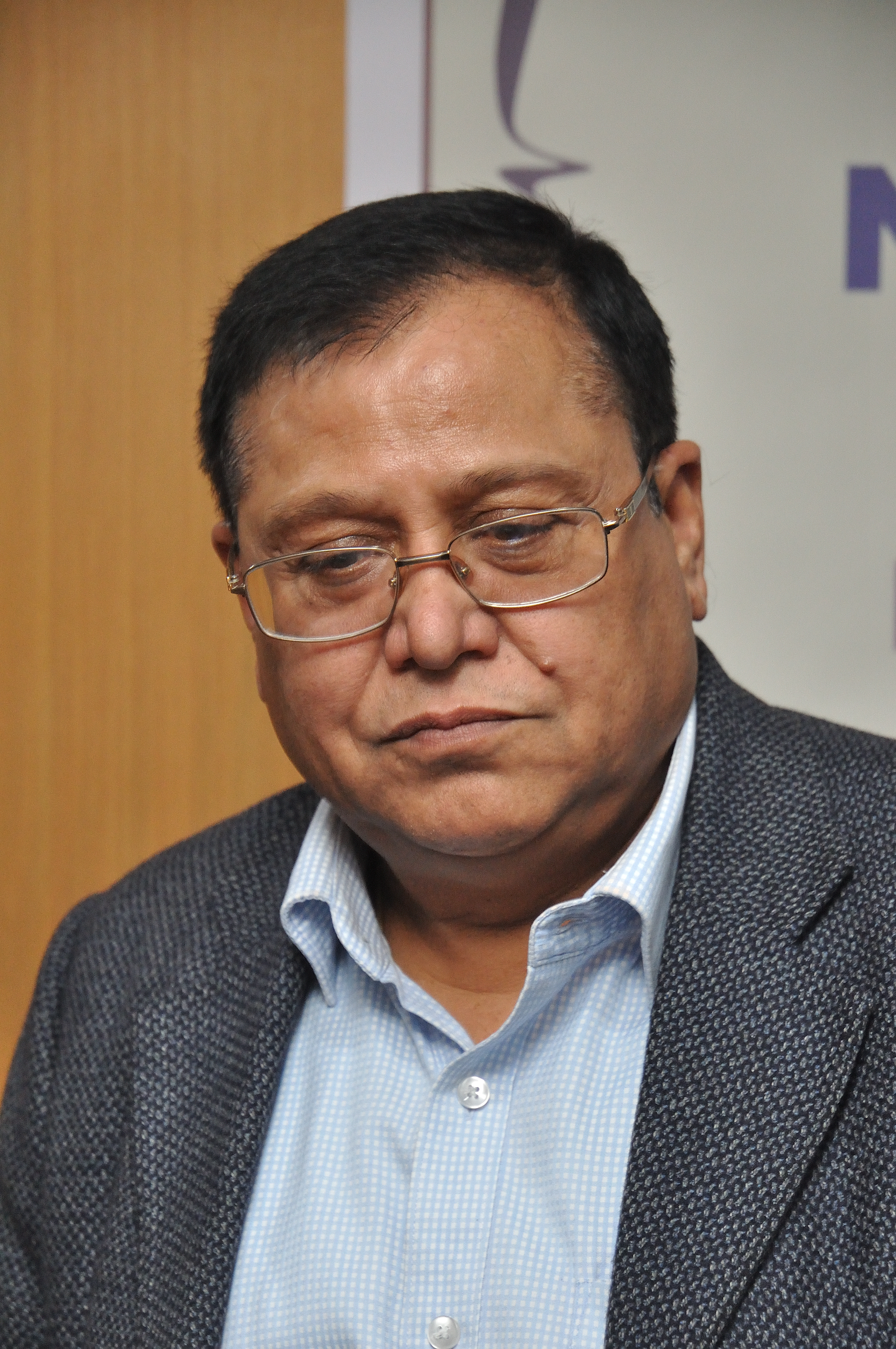

10th Director General of Defence research and development organisation
- In office 2009-2013
- Preceded by: M Natarajan
- Succeeded by: Avinash Chander (DRDO)

Personal details
- Born: 25 May 1949 (age 77) Gwalior, Madhya Pradesh, India
- Education: Madhav Institute of Technology and Science; IISC, Bangalore; Osmania University
- Occupation: Former Chancellor of JNU
- Awards: Padma Shri; Padma Bhushan; Aryabhata Award

Vijay Kumar Saraswat is an Indian scientist who formerly served as the Director General of the Defence Research and Development Organisation (DRDO) and the Chief Scientific Advisor to the Indian Minister of Defence. He retired as the Director General of the DRDO on 31 May 2013. Saraswat served as member of NITI Aayog, the Indian Government's apex public policy think tank from 2015 till 2026. Saraswat is also a former Chancellor of Jawaharlal Nehru University. and former President of Sree Chitra Tirunal Institute for Medical Sciences and Technology, Trivandrum.

Saraswat is the key scientist in the development of the Prithvi missile and its induction in the Indian armed forces. He is a recipient of the Padma Shri and Padma Bhushan from the Government of India.

== Early life ==
Born on 25 May 1949 in Danaoli locality in Gwalior, Saraswat completed his Bachelors in Engineering from Madhav Institute of Technology and Science Gwalior, M.P. He earned a Master of Engineering degree from Indian Institute of Science (IISc) followed by a Doctorate in Propulsion Engineering from Osmania University.

== Honors ==
Saraswat is fellow of National Academy of Engineering, Aeronautical Society of India, Astronautical Society of India, and Institution of Engineers. He is a member of governing council of SAMEER and member of Board of Research of AICTE, CSIR labs, and board of studies of Osmania University. He is chairman, Combustion Institute (Indian Section), and Aeronautical Society of India (Hyderabad Branch). Saraswat is a forerunner in the development of number of critical missile technologies that were under denial due to the Missile Technology Control Regime, thus making India self-reliant in Missile Technologies. He has headed various committees of national importance.

Saraswat is the recipient of DRDO Scientist of the Year Award – 1987, National Aeronautical Prize – 1993, DRDO Technology Transfer Award – 1996 and Performance Excellence Award – 1999. For his outstanding contributions to the Nation, he has been conferred with Padma Shri in 1998 and Padma Bhusan in 2013. In January 2010 and December 2012 he was awarded with honorary doctorate from Sardar Vallabhbhai National Institute of Technology, Surat, SRM Institute of Science and Technology Chennai and Jawaharlal Nehru Technological University, Hyderabad respectively. He received the Aryabhata Award in 2011. Academy of Grassroots Studies and Research of India (AGRASRI), Tirupati, awarded him the Rajiv Gandhi Outstanding Leadership National Award for the year 2014 on 20 August 2014 at Tirupati, by Dr. A. Chakrapani, the then Chairman, Andhra Pradesh State Legislative Council. Dr. V.K. Saraswat delivered the 14th Rajiv Gandhi Memorial Lecture on 20 August 2014 at Tirupati.

== Issues and controversies ==
After internal audit reports and CAG raising red flags over many of V. K. Saraswat's decisions, the Ministry of Defence decided to impose severe restrictions on his financial powers. Government of India in 2013 turned down his extension as DRDO's Chief.
