= List of current nuclear triads =

The following list of nuclear triads, deployed in 2024, includes all five countries known to possess them (United States, Russia, China, India and Pakistan). Where available, the names and number of nuclear warheads are given. The list excludes non-strategic (tactical) nuclear weapons.

The United States and Russia, previously Soviet Union, have been wielding their nuclear triads since the 1960s. Pakistan completed its nuclear triad in 2017, India in 2018 and China in 2020.

== United States ==
Land
Weapon	Type	Warhead	Number of warheads	Delivery
LGM-30G Minuteman III	ICBM	W78 / W87	400 (Note: If authorized by the President, Minuteman III could carry up to two additional warheads.)	Ground silo

Sea
Weapon	Type	Warhead	Number of warheads	Delivery
Trident II D5	SLBM	W76-0/1/2, W88	1920 (Note: Of them 1511 W76-1, 384 W88 and 25 W76-2.)	Ohio-class submarines

Air
Weapon	Type	Warhead	Delivery
AGM-86B/C/D	ALCM	W80-1	B-52H Stratofortress
B61-7/11, B83-1	Unguided bomb	—N/a	B-2A Spirit

== Russia ==
Land
Weapon	Type	Number of warheads	Delivery
RS-24 Yars	ICBM	772	Ground silo / transporter erector launcher
RS-20V Voyevoda (Note: Expected to be replaced by RS-28 Sarmat.)	ICBM	340	Ground silo
RT-2PM2 Topol-M	ICBM	78	Ground silo / transporter erector launcher
Avangard missile complex	ICBM	7	Ground silo

Sea
Weapon	Type	Number of warheads	Delivery
RSM-56 Bulava	SLBM	576	Borei-class submarines
R-29RMU Sineva / Layner	SLBM	320	Delta-III and Delta IV-class submarines

Air
Weapon	Type	Number of warheads	Delivery
Kh-55, Kh-102	ALCM	448	Tupolev Tu-95MS
Kh-55, Kh-102	ALCM	132	Tupolev Tu-160

== India ==
Land
Weapon	Type	Number of warheads	Delivery
Agni-I	SRBM	~20	Transporter erector launcher / rail mobile
Agni-II	SRBM	~8	Transporter erector launcher
Agni-III	IRBM	~8	Transporter erector launcher / rail mobile
Agni-IV	IRBM	—N/a	Transporter erector launcher/ rail mobile
Agni-V	ICBM	—N/a	Transporter erector launcher / rail mobile
Prithvi-II	SRBM	~24	Transporter erector launcher

Sea
Weapon	Type	Number of warheads	Delivery
Dhanush	ShLBM	~4	Sukanya-class patrol vessels
Sagarika (K-15)	SLBM	12	INS Arihant, INS Arighaat
K-4	SLBM	—	INS Arighaat, INS Aridhaman
K-5	SLBM	—	INS Arisudan, S5 Class Submarines

Air
Weapon	Type	Number of warheads	Delivery
Classified 20-kt bomb	Unguided bomb	~16	Dassault Mirage 2000H
?	Unguided and laser guided bombs	~32	SEPECAT Jaguar

== Pakistan ==
Land
Weapon	Type	Number of warheads	Delivery
Nasr	SRBM	24	Transporter erector launcher
Abdali-I	SRBM	10	Transporter erector launcher
Ghaznavi	SRBM	16	Transporter erector launcher
Shaheen-I	SRBM	16	Transporter erector launcher
Shaheen-II	MRBM	24	Transporter erector launcher
Shaheen-III	MRBM	—	Transporter erector launcher
Ghauri	MRBM	24	Transporter erector launcher
Ababeel	MRBM	24	Transporter erector launcher
Babur-1	GLCM	12	Transporter erector launcher

Sea
Weapon	Type	Number of warheads	Delivery
Babur-III	SLCM	—	Agosta-class submarine

Air
Weapon	Type	Number of warheads	Delivery
Ra'ad	ALCM	36	Dassault Mirage III/V
Ra'ad-II	ALCM	36	Dassault Mirage III/V

== China ==
Land
Weapon	Type	Number of warheads	Delivery
DF-5A	ICBM	6	Ground silo
DF-5B	ICBM	60	Ground silo
DF-5C	ICBM	?	Ground silo
DF-21A/E	MRBM	?	Mobile launcher
DF-26	IRBM	108	Mobile launcher
DF-31	ICBM	?	Ground silo / transporter erector launcher
DF-31A	ICBM	24	
DF-31AG	ICBM	64	Mobile launcher
DF-31BJ	ICBM	?	Ground silo
DF-41	ICBM	84	Ground silo / transporter erector launcher, rail mobile
DF-61	ICBM	?	Mobile launcher

Sea
Weapon	Type	Number of warheads	Delivery
JL-2, JL-3	SLBM	0 (for the JL-2), 72 (for the JL-3)	Type 094 submarines

Air
Weapon	Type	Number of warheads	Delivery
JL-1	ALBM	?	Xi'an H-6N
?	Unguided bomb	10	Xi'an H-6K

== See also ==
- List of states with nuclear weapons
