= INS Arisudan =

Arihant-class nuclear submarine

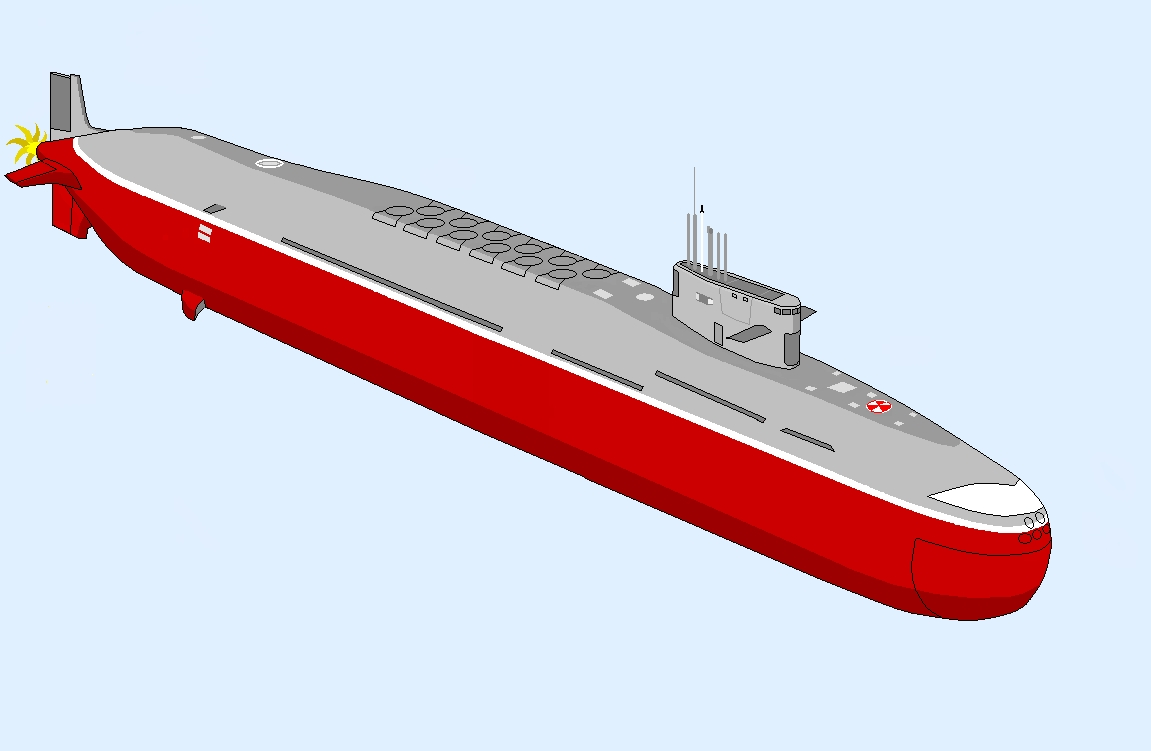
- A conceptual drawing representing the Arihant Stretch design

History

India
- Name: INS Arisudan
- Builder: Shipbuilding Centre (SBC), Visakhapatnam, India
- Laid down: 2018
- Launched: 16 October 2024
- Status: Sea trials underway

General characteristics
- Class & type: Arihant-class submarine
- Type: Nuclear ballistic missile submarine
- Displacement: 7,000 tonnes
- Length: 130 m
- Beam: 11 m
- Draft: 9.5 m
- Installed power: 1 x CLWR-B1 Compact Light-water reactor, 83 MW
- Propulsion: 1 × propeller shaft, nuclear propulsion
- Speed: Surfaced: 12–15 knots (22–28 km/h) Submerged: 24 knots (44 km/h)
- Range: Unlimited except by food supplies
- Endurance: Unlimited except by food supply and maintenance
- Test depth: Between 300 m (980 ft) to 400 m (1,300 ft)
- Sensors & processing systems: USHUS sonar; Panchendriya unified submarine sonar, control system and underwater communication system
- Armament: 6 × 21" (533 mm) torpedo tubes – est 30 charges (torpedoes, cruise missiles or mines); 8 VLS cells for either; 24 K-15 Sagarika SLBM; 8 K-4 SLBM

INS Arisudan (SSBN 83) (lit. 'Slayer of foes') is a nuclear-powered ballistic missile submarine, and the fourth and final Arihant-class submarine of the Indian Navy. It is designated S4* Strategic Strike Nuclear Submarine. The 7,000-tonne vessel was built under the Advanced Technology Vessel (ATV) project at the Ship Building Centre in the port city of Visakhapatnam. It is an upgraded variant of the Arihant-class submarine.

== Description ==
The boat will have one seven-blade propeller powered by a Compact Light Water Reactor (CLWR). It can achieve a maximum speed of 12–15 knots (22–28 km/h) when on surface and 24 knots (44 km/h) when submerged. The CLWR is an upgraded form of the one that powers INS Arihant. The CLWR has exceptionally lower acoustic signature than the previous generation making it harder to detect by enemy vessels along with longer endurance.

The submarine has eight VLS tubes in its hump, as compared to four on her predecessors— She can carry up to 24 K-15 Sagarika missiles (each with a range of 750 km or 470 mi), eight K-4 missiles (with a range of 3,500 km or 2,200 mi) or K-5 missiles (with range of 6,000 km or 3,700 mi).

== Construction ==
Around 2012, the S5 submarine project to succeed and supplement the first three Arihant class submarines remained in the developmental stage. Hence, another Arihant-class submarine was cleared for production as a stopgap measure to avoid idling of the production line.

The newly designated S4* submarine will be fourth and final submarine of the class, with an indigenous content of over 80% and equipped with K4 missiles, was thereafter launched on 16 October 2024. By December 2025, the submarine entered sea trials. During the fourth week of the month, the vessel sailed out from her berth at the Shipbuilding Centre.

== Naming ==
The submarine was designated as S4*, as it was an follow on order to the previous class and will be built before the tentative S5 class submarines. The new unit designated as S4* would feature the stretched configuration of the third submarine of the class, INS Aridhaman. S4* could be commissioned in late 2027 and would enable continuous at-sea deterrence. The submarine may also take upp the pennent number S76. The submarine will be initially homeported in Visakapatnam before moving to INS Varsha.

It was also reported in January 2026, that the final submarine, so far referred to as S4*, will be named INS Arisudan upon entry into service. The name has been proposed by the ship-naming committee of the Indian Navy and is yet to be receive clearance by the defence ministry and eventually, the President of India, who is also the Supreme Commander of the Armed Forces.

== See also ==
- Future of the Indian Navy
- K Missile family
