= INS Aridhaman =

Arihant-class nuclear submarine

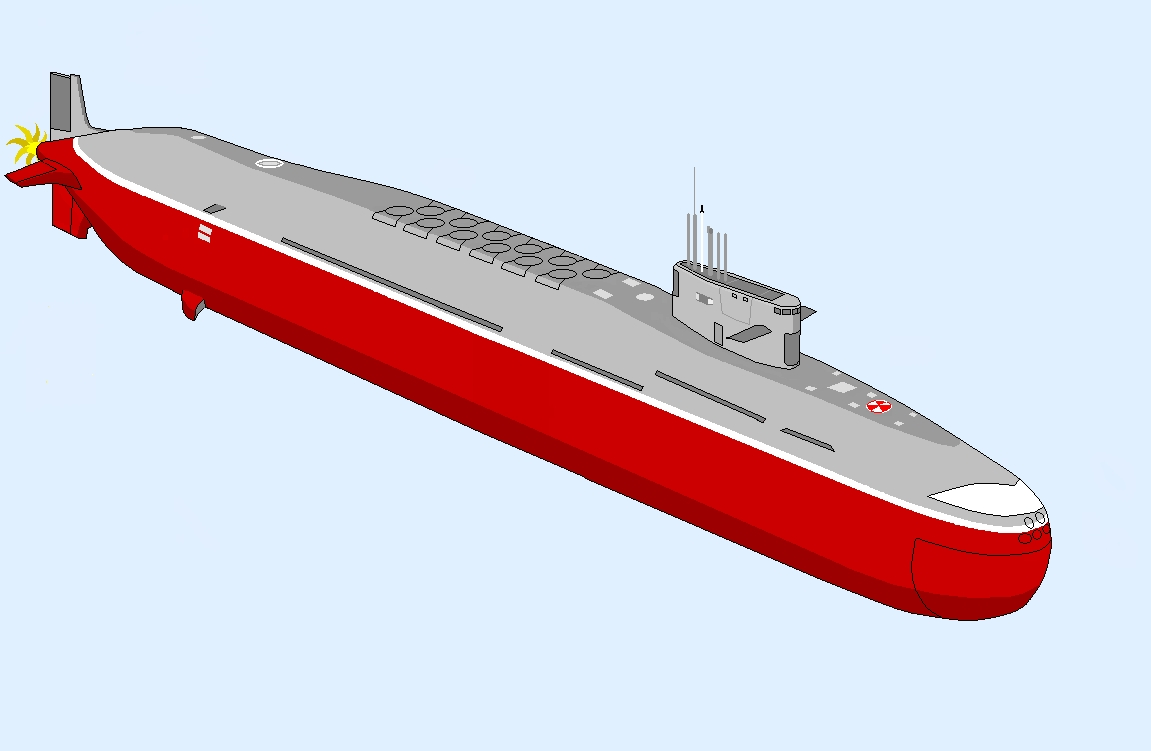
- A conceptual drawing representing the Arihant Stretch design

History

India
- Name: INS Aridaman
- Builder: Shipbuilding Centre (SBC), Visakhapatnam, India
- Laid down: 2018
- Launched: 23 November 2021
- Commissioned: 3 April 2026
- Status: In active service

General characteristics
- Class & type: Arihant-class ballistic missile submarine
- Type: Ballistic missile submarine
- Displacement: 7,000 tonnes
- Length: 130 m
- Beam: 11 m
- Draft: 9.5 m
- Installed power: 1 x CLWR-B1 Compact Light-water reactor, 83 MW
- Propulsion: 1 × propeller shaft, nuclear propulsion
- Speed: Surfaced: 12–15 knots (22–28 km/h) Submerged: 24 knots (44 km/h)
- Range: Unlimited except by food supplies
- Endurance: Unlimited except by food supply and maintenance
- Test depth: Between 300 m (980 ft) to 400 m (1,300 ft)
- Sensors & processing systems: USHUS sonar; Panchendriya unified submarine sonar, control system and underwater communication system

INS Aridhaman (SSBN 82) (lit. 'Vanquisher of Foes') is a nuclear-powered ballistic missile submarine, and the third of the Indian Navy's Arihant-class submarine. It is designated S4 Strategic Strike Nuclear Submarine. The 7,000-tonne vessel was built under the Advanced Technology Vessel (ATV) project at the Ship Building Centre in the port city of Visakhapatnam. It is an upgraded variant of the Arihant-class submarine.

== Description ==
The boat will have one seven-blade propeller powered by a Compact Light Water Reactor (CLWR). It can achieve a maximum speed of 12–15 knots (22–28 km/h) when on surface and 24 knots (44 km/h) when submerged. The CLWR is an upgraded form of the one that powers INS Arihant. The CLWR has exceptionally lower acoustic signature than the previous generation making it harder to detect by enemy vessels along with longer endurance.

The submarine has eight VLS tubes in its hump, as compared to four on her predecessors—INS Arihant, the lead ship of the class, and INS Arighaat. She can carry up to 24 K-15 Sagarika missiles (each with a range of 750 km or 470 mi), eight K-4 missiles (with a range of 3,500 km or 2,200 mi) or K-5 missiles (with range of 6,000 km or 3,700 mi).

== Construction and career ==
INS Aridhaman was launched on 23 November 2021. As of February 2025, the submarine was undergoing trials and was expected to be commissioned in 2025 itself.

On 2 December 2025, the Navy chief, Admiral Dinesh K Tripathi, announced that the submarine had entered the final stages of trials and would be commissioned soon. By late December, the boat had completed sea trials. On 19 February 2026, an NDTV report indicated that the submarine is ready for induction between April and May in the year.

The submarine was commissioned on 3 April 2026 by the Defence Minister, Rajnath Singh.

== See also ==
- INS Arihant (S2)
- INS Arighaat (S3)
- List of ships of the Indian Navy
- List of Submarines of the Indian Navy
- Future of the Indian Navy

== See also ==
- INS Arihant
- Arihant-class submarine
- Future of the Indian Navy
- K Missile family
