= INS Arighaat =

Arihant-class nuclear submarine

- An artist's impression of an Arihant-class submarine

History

India
- Name: INS Arighaat
- Builder: Shipbuilding Centre (SBC), Visakhapatnam, India
- Laid down: 2011
- Launched: 19 November 2017
- Commissioned: 29 August 2024
- Status: Active

General characteristics
- Class & type: Arihant-class ballistic missile submarine
- Type: Ballistic missile submarine
- Displacement: 6,000 tonnes
- Length: 111.6 m
- Beam: 11 m
- Draft: 9.5 m
- Installed power: 1 x CLWR-B1 Compact Light-water reactor, 83 MW
- Propulsion: 1 × propeller shaft, nuclear propulsion
- Speed: Surfaced: 12–15 knots (22–28 km/h) Submerged: 24 knots (44 km/h)
- Range: Unlimited except by food supplies
- Endurance: Unlimited except by food supply and maintenance
- Test depth: Between 300 m (980 ft) to 400 m (1,300 ft)
- Sensors & processing systems: USHUS sonar; Panchendriya unified submarine sonar, control system and underwater communication system
- Armament: 6 × 533 mm (21 in) torpedo tubes - estd. 30 charges (torpedoes, missiles or mines); 4 VLS cells for; 12 × K-15 Sagarika SLBM (or); 4 × K-4 SLBM

INS Arighaat (SSBN 81) (lit. 'The one who attacks the enemy') is the second of the Indian Navy's Arihant-class submarine. It is designated S3 Strategic Strike Nuclear Submarine. The 6,000 tonne vessel was built under the Advanced Technology Vessel (ATV) project at the Ship Building Centre in the port city of Visakhapatnam.

The submarine was quietly launched in 2017 and little has been publicly announced about its capabilities and current status. The submarine was originally known as INS Aridhaman but was renamed INS Arighaat upon its launch. Arighaat was commissioned on 29 August 2024.

== Description ==
The boat will have one seven-blade propeller powered by a Compact Light water reactor (CLWR). It can achieve a maximum speed of 12–15 knots (22–28 km/h) when on surface and 24 knots (44 km/h) when submerged. The CLWR is an upgraded form of the one that powers INS Arihant. The CLWR has exceptionally lower acoustic signature than the previous generation making it harder to detect by enemy vessels along with longer endurance.

The submarine has four launch tubes in its hump, just like her predecessor. She can carry up to 12 K-15 Sagarika missiles (each with a range of 750 km or 470 mi), or four K-4 missiles (with a range of 3,500 km or 2,200 mi).

== Status ==
INS Arighaat was launched in November 2017. INS Arighaat was expected to be commissioned in 2021. However the commissioning was pushed to 2024 as per a report in the Hindustan Times. INS Arighaat has been commissioned on 29 August 2024 after extensive trials and upgrades. The commissioning ceremony was held in the presence of Defence Minister Rajnath Singh in Naval Dockyard at Visakhapatnam.

INS Arighaat is significantly more advanced than the INS Arihant with an increased indigenous content of 70%. In contrast to its predecessor which is equipped with only 750-km range missiles, Arighaat is equipped with both K-15 Sagarika and K-4 missiles.

== Service history ==
On 27 November 2024, a nuclear-capable K-4 SLBM with a range of 3,500 km (2,200 mi) was tested from INS Arighaat in Bay of Bengal. The missile was tested without a warhead and this was the first submarine launch of the long range missile system. While the missile launch was a success, the other parameters for the missile test is being examined as of 2 December.

== See also ==
- INS Arihant
- Arihant-class submarine
- Future of the Indian Navy
- K Missile family
