= K-6 (missile) =

Indian submarine-launched ballistic missile

- Type: SLBM
- Place of origin: India

Service history
- In service: Under development

Production history
- Designer: Advanced Systems Laboratory (DRDO)

Specifications
- Mass: 50 t (55 short tons)
- Length: >12 m (39 ft)
- Diameter: >2 m (6.6 ft)
- Warhead: 3,000 kg (6,600 lb), 4-6 MIRV nuclear/conventional weapon
- Engine: Solid-fuelled
- Operational range: 8,000–10,000 km (5,000–6,200 mi)
- Maximum speed: Mach 7 – Mach 7.5 (8,600–9,190 km/h; 5,300–5,710 mph; 2.4–2.55 km/s)
- Launch platform: S5-class submarine

K-6 is an intercontinental submarine-launched ballistic missile under development by the Defence Research and Development Organisation of India. The missile has a planned range of more than 8000 Kilometres.

== History ==
The development of the K-6 missile, with a range of 6,000 km, was initially reported in early 2017.

Admiral Arun Prakash wrote in 2018 that the missile range of the Arihant-class submarines is not sufficient to target potential adversaries of India; a missile with a range of around 6,000-8,000 kilometres would be required for this task to be performed by a submarine patrolling in a "safe haven".

When the missile payload limitations of the Arihant-class were realised, India began developing the S5-class of submarines and the K-6 ballistic missiles. The developmental work for these missiles started in February 2017 at the Advanced Systems Laboratory of the Defence Research and Development Organisation (DRDO), with a completion target of less than ten years.

== Description ==
The K-6 is an intercontinental submarine-launched ballistic missile. It is a three-stage missile and is solid fuelled. It is planned to armed with multiple independently targetable reentry vehicles and will have a range of around 8,000 to 12,000 kilometres with a three-tonne payload. It has a planned length of over 12 metres and a diameter of over 2 metres. It will be able carry both conventional and nuclear warheads.

== Development ==
The K-6 is being developed by the Advanced Systems Laboratory of DRDO since 2017. Testing of the K-5 missile will assist in developing the K-6.

== See also ==
- K Missile family
- S5-class submarine
- India and weapons of mass destruction
