= K Missile family =

Indian ballistic missile

'K' Missile family
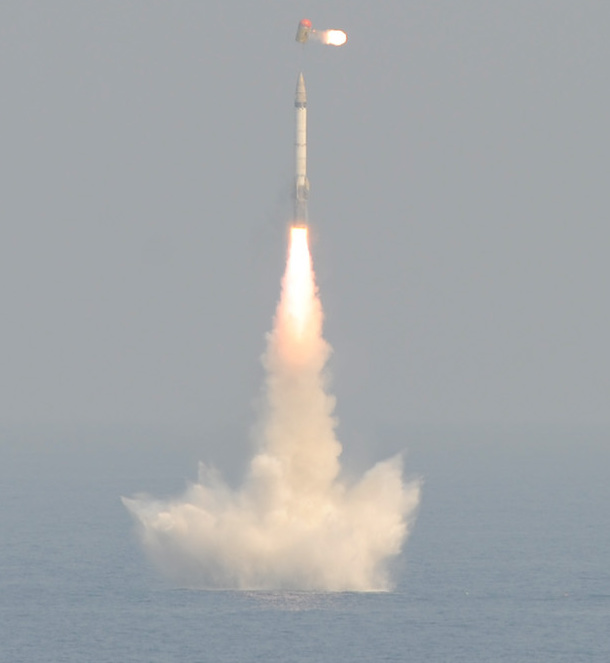
- Underwater launch of a K Series Missile
- Type: SLBM
- Place of origin: India

Service history
- In service: K-15 (2018); K-4 (2024).
- Used by: Indian Navy

Production history
- Designer: Defence Research and Development Organisation
- Manufacturer: Bharat Dynamics Limited
- Produced: K-15 and K-4 in production

Specifications
- Mass: 6-7 tonnes (K-15); 17 tonnes (K-4)
- Length: 10 m (K-15, K-4); 12 m (K-6)
- Width: 0.74 m (K-15); 1.3 m (K-4)
- Maximum firing range: 8,000-9000 km MIRV capable (K-6 SLBM)
- Warhead: K-15:1 tonne, K-4:1-2.5 tonnes, K-5:2.5 tonne
- Operational range: 3,500 km
- Maximum depth: over 50 m (tested)
- Maximum speed: Mach 7.5 (Shaurya, which is land-based version of sagarika K-15 missile),(K-6)
- Launch platform: Arihant-class submarine, S5-class submarine

The K family of missiles (K for 'Kalam') (Note: named in honour of Indian rocket scientist and former president of India A. P. J. Abdul Kalam (1931-2015)) is a family of submarine-launched ballistic missiles (SLBM) developed by India to boost its second strike abilities and thus augment its nuclear deterrence. Information about this family of missiles has mostly been kept classified. It is reported that 'K missiles' are faster, lighter and stealthier than their Agni missile counterparts. High Energy Materials Research Laboratory (HEMRL) developed a new formulation of composite propellant that is more efficient and provide greater thrust compare to Agni missile series. The objective behind the development is to make K missile family faster and lighter without compromising on operational range.

== Missiles in the series ==
| Name | Type | Range (km) |
|---|---|---|
| K-15 (SLBM) | SRBM | 750–1,500 (operational) |
| K-4 (SLBM) | MRBM | 3,500–4,000 (operational) |
| K-5 (SLBM) | ICBM | 5,000–6,000 (in development) |
| K-6 (SLBM) | ICBM | 8,000–9,000 (in development) |

=== K-15 or Sagarika missile ===
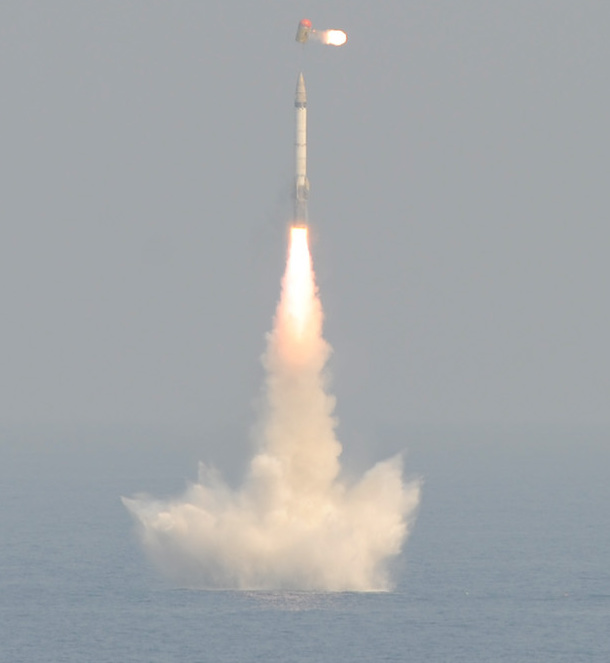
Sagarika SLBM

The Sagarika/K-15 missile (Sanskrit: सागरिका, IAST:Sāgarikā, meaning Oceanic) is the SLBM version of the land-based Shaurya missile. With a shorter range than K-4 missiles it is to be integrated with Arihant class submarine concurrently developed for the use of Indian Navy.

Sagarika/K-15 was developed at the Defence Research and Development Organisation's (DRDO) missile complex in Hyderabad. The complex consists of the Defence Research and Development Laboratory (DRDL), the Advanced Systems Laboratory (ASL) and the Research Centre Imarat (RCI). DRDL designed and developed the missile, while the ASL provided the motors and propulsion systems. The RCI's contribution was in avionics, including control and guidance systems and inertial navigation systems.

Medium range K-15 ballistic missile has a range between 700 km to 1,500 km with varying payload. This will also get help from Indian Regional Navigation Satellite System (IRNSS) to ensure guaranteed national access to precision navigation. These will enable high accuracy required for precision strike. The last development test of the missile occurred on 28 January 2013, from an underwater launch platform off the coast of Visakhapatnam.

=== K-4 Missile ===
This missile was developed after facing significant difficulties in compacting a similarly capable Agni-III to equip the INS Arihant.

K-4 is an intermediate-range submarine-launched ballistic missile developed by DRDO. It is 10 meters long, weighs 20 tonnes, and can carry a 2 tonne payload up to a range of 3,500 km. INS Arihant, first of the Arihant-class submarines, will be able to carry 4 K-4 missiles. The K-4 missile was successfully tested on 24 March 2014 from an underwater pontoon submerged 30 m deep. India successfully test fired the 3,500 km strike range nuclear-capable K-4 submarine-launched ballistic missile off the coast of Andhra Pradesh on 19 January 2020. On 24 January 2020, the final trials were carried out by DRDO in which the missile achieved the near zero circular error probability and hit the target 3,500 km away. This was carried from INS Arihant and clears all validation test.

K-4 has completed all the trials and been cleared for production by the government. It will be used to arm the Arihant-class submarine and future S5-class submarine. It will greatly enhance India's nuclear doctrine as K-15 has range of 750 km and it will have the range of 3,500 km.

=== K-5 Missile ===
K-5 missile is reportedly being developed by Defence Research and Development Organisation (DRDO) for the Indian strategic forces' underwater platforms. It will arm the future variants of Arihant-class submarines of the Indian Navy. Reportedly, DRDO is in the process of developing a submarine-launched solid fuel missile with a maximum range of 5,000-6,000 kilometres. In October 2020, Hindustan Times reported that the missile was then in development and expected to be tested by 2022.

=== K-6 Missile ===
K-6 missile is SLBM which is reportedly under development by Defence Research and Development Organisation's (DRDO) Advanced Naval Systems Laboratory in Hyderabad. It is a three-stage solid fuel multiple independently targetable reentry vehicle (MIRV) capable missile with a length of 12 m, width of 2 m, payload of 2-3 tonne warhead, and a range of 6,000 to 8,000 km. It will arm the S5-class submarine of ballistic missile submarines of the Indian Navy.

== Significance ==
These 'K' missiles are intrinsically important for India's nuclear deterrence arsenal because they provide India with a much needed ideal and invulnerable second-strike capability stated in India's Nuclear Doctrine and thus shift the balance of power in India's favour in the Asian region.

== See also ==
- R-29 Vysota – (Soviet Union)
- R-29RM Shtil – (Soviet Union)
- R-29RMU Sineva – (Russia)
- R-29RMU2 Layner – (Russia)
- RSM-56 Bulava – (Russia)
- UGM-133 Trident II – (United States)
- M45 (missile) – (France)
- M51 (missile) – (France)
- JL-1 – (China)
- JL-2 – (China)
- Pukguksong-1 – (North Korea)
- R-39 Rif – (Soviet Union)
- R-39M – (Russia)
