= Shaurya (missile) =

Indian surface-to-surface weapon

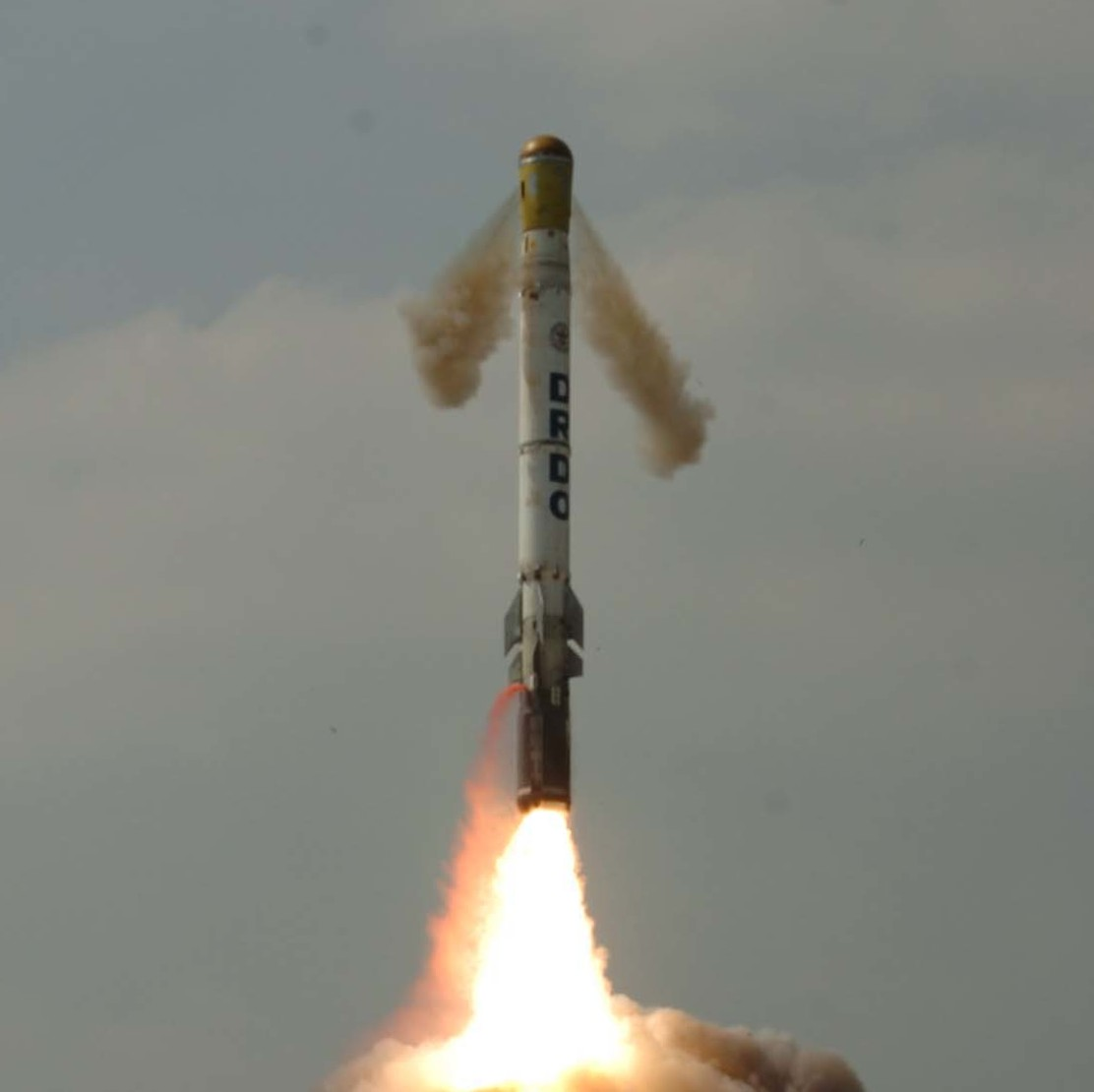
- Shaurya Missile first test launch
- Type: Short-range ballistic missile
- Place of origin: India

Service history
- Used by: Strategic Forces Command

Production history
- Designer: Research Centre Imarat
- Manufacturer: Bharat Dynamics Limited
- Produced: 2011–present

Specifications
- Mass: 6.2 t (6.8 short tons)
- Length: 10 m (33 ft)
- Diameter: 0.74 m (2.4 ft)
- Warhead: Conventional and strategic nuclear weapon
- Warhead weight: 200–1,000 kilograms (440–2,200 lb)
- Engine: Two-stage solid rocket motor
- Propellant: Solid fuel
- Operational range: 700 to 1,900 km (430 to 1,180 mi)
- Flight altitude: 50 km (31 mi)
- Maximum speed: Mach 7.5 (9,190 km/h; 5,710 mph; 2.55 km/s)
- Guidance system: RLG-INS and accelerometer
- Accuracy: 20 m to 30 m CEP
- Launch platform: Canisterised transporter erector launcher or underground silo

Shaurya (lit. 'Valour') is a hypersonic, canister-launched surface-to-surface short-range ballistic missile developed by the Indian Defence Research and Development Organisation for use by the Indian Armed Forces. It has a range of 700 to 1,900 km (430 to 1,180 mi) and is capable of carrying a payload of 200 to 1,000 kg (440 to 2,200 lb) conventional or nuclear warhead.

== Description ==
The Shaurya missile is speculated to be the land version of the submarine-launched Sagarika K-15 missile. However, the DRDO officials have reportedly denied its connection with the K-15 programme.

Shaurya incorporates a ring laser gyroscope and accelerometer, which was tested and integrated by the Research Centre Imarat, based in Hyderabad.

The Shaurya missile was revealed to be designed specifically to be fired from submarines. Once it reaches the target area it manoeuvres towards the target before striking with an accuracy of 20 to 30 m within the target area.

== Testing ==
The missile was launched from an underground facility with an in-built canister from Complex-3 of the Integrated Test Range at Chandipur.

The missile was successfully test-fired for the third time, from the Integrated Test Range at Chandipur, Odisha, on Saturday 24 September 2011, in its final configuration. The missile flew at 7.5 Mach, and covered its full range of 700 km in 500 seconds. After this test, the missile is ready for production and induction into the Navy.

On 3 October 2020, DRDO successfully test-fired an advanced version of the Shaurya with an 800km range from Balasore as part of user trials.

== Operators ==
- India - As of 6 October 2020, the Union Government of India under the guidance of the National Security Council (NSC) approved induction and deployment of Shaurya in the Strategic Forces Command (SFC).

== Gallery ==
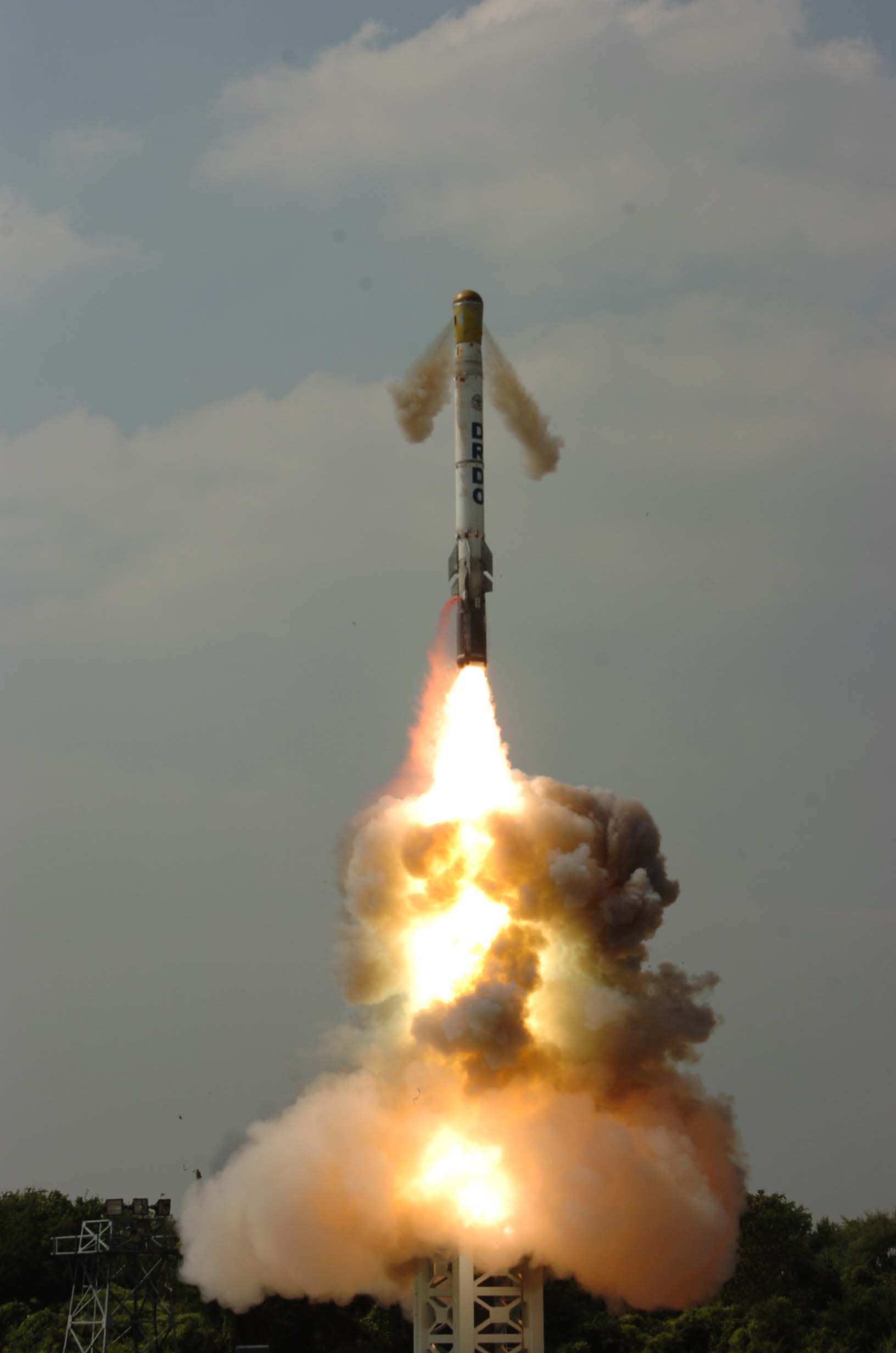
DRDO test fired Shourya from canister on November 12, 2008.

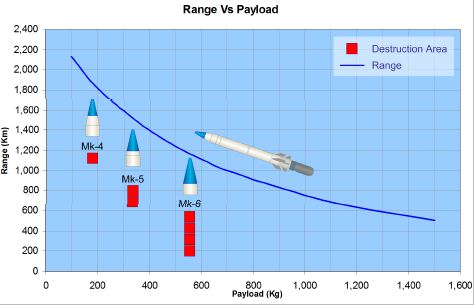
Range v/s Payload for Shaurya Missile

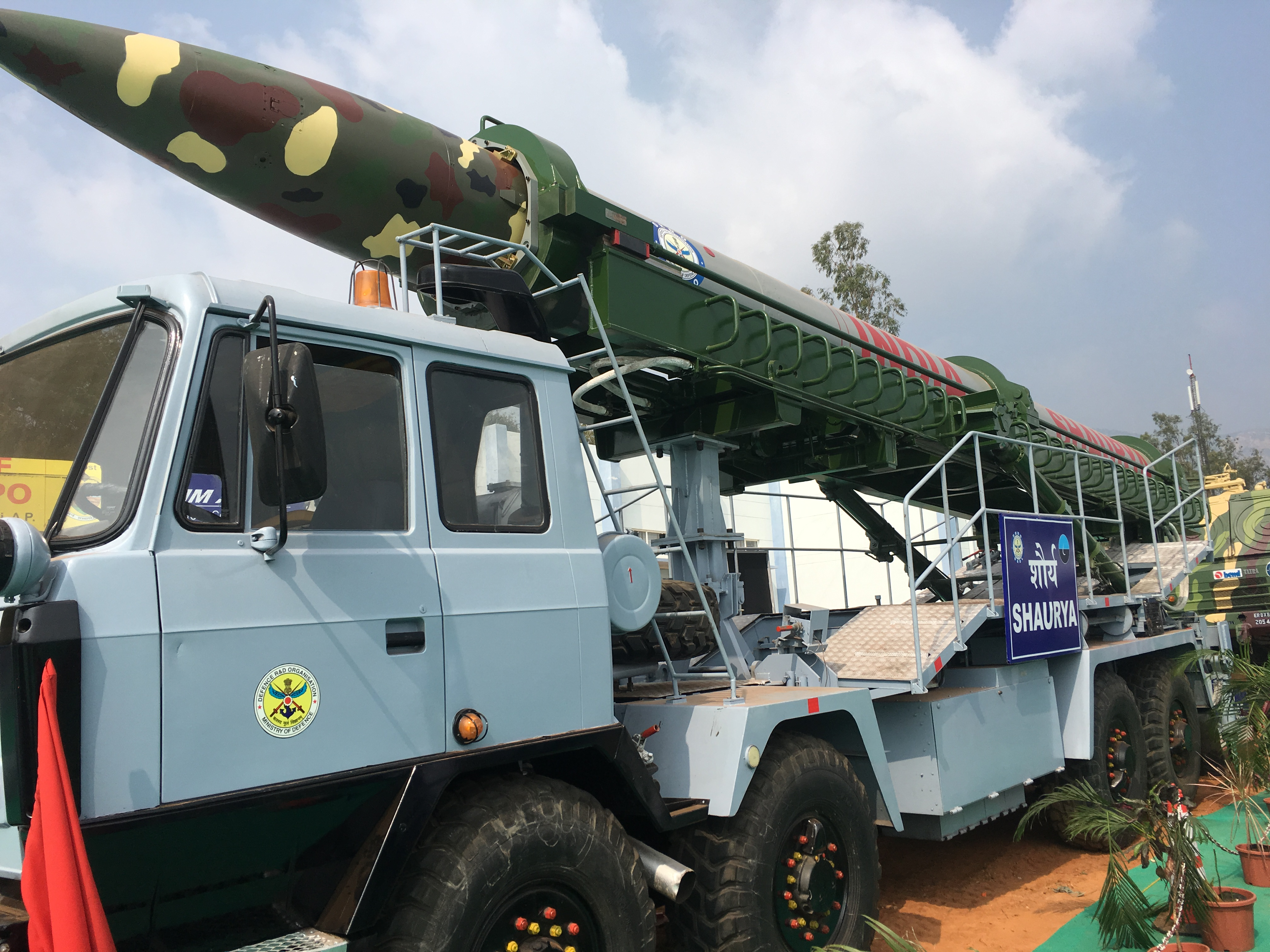
Shaurya missile on launcher

== See also ==
Related development

- Sagarika
- K Missile family
