= Arihant-class submarine =

Class of Indian nuclear-powered ballistic missile submarines

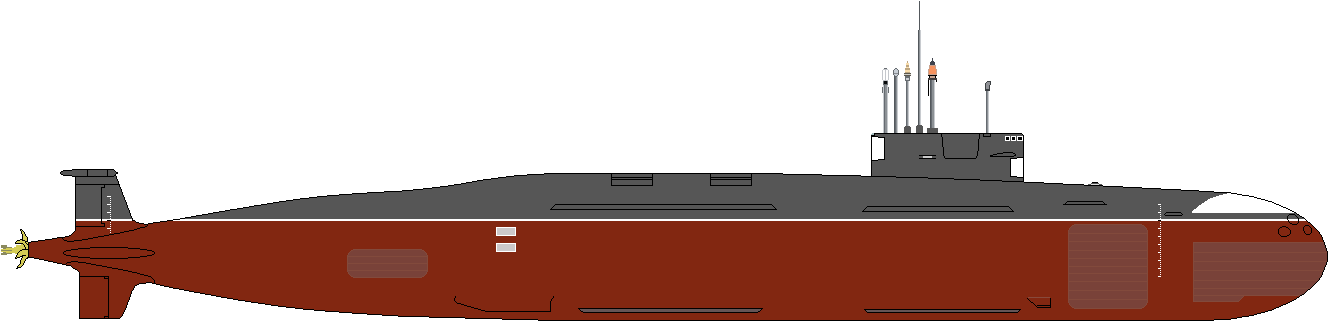
- Profile of Arihant-class submarine

Class overview
- Name: Arihant
- Builders: Ship Building Centre (SBC), Visakhapatnam
- Operators: Indian Navy
- Succeeded by: S5 class
- Cost: ₹40 billion (US$430 million) per submarine
- In commission: 2016–present
- Planned: 4
- Completed: 4
- Active: 3

General characteristics
- Type: Ballistic missile submarine
- Displacement: Arihant & Arighaat: 6,000 t (5,900 long tons; 6,600 short tons) surfaced; Aridhaman & Arisudan: 7,000 t (6,900 long tons; 7,700 short tons)
- Length: Arihant subclass: 111 m (364 ft); Aridhaman subclass: 130 m (430 ft)
- Beam: 11 m (36 ft)
- Draft: 15 m (49 ft)
- Propulsion: 1 x CLWR-B1 pressurized water reactor (83 MW-100MW); 1 × shaft
- Speed: Surfaced: 12–15 kn (22–28 km/h); Submerged: 24 kn (44 km/h)
- Range: Unlimited except by food supplies
- Test depth: 450 m (1,480 ft)
- Complement: 95
- Sensors & processing systems: USHUS sonar; Panchendriya sonar
- Armament: 6 × 21" (533 mm) torpedo tubes – est 30 charges (torpedoes, cruise missiles or mines); 4 × SLBM tubes for Arihant subclass: 8 × SLBM tubes for Aridhaman subclass: Per SLBM tube: 3 × B-05: 750–1,500 km (470–930 mi) range, or; 1 × K-4: 3,500 km (2,200 mi) range, or; 1 × K-5: 5,000–6,000 km (3,100–3,700 mi) range (for Aridhaman subclass)

The Arihant-class (lit. 'Destroyer of Enemies') is a class of ballistic missile submarines in service with the Indian Navy. They were developed under the Advanced Technology Vessel (ATV) project to design and build nuclear-powered submarines. It is considered as a black project. These vessels are classified as strategic strike nuclear submarines by India.

After INS Arihant, the lead ship of the class, was commissioned in August 2016, India became the only country outside the five permanent members of the United Nations Security Council to operate a ballistic missile submarine. INS Arihant and INS Arighaat are already on deep sea patrols by 25 October 2024.

== History ==
In December 1971, during the Indo-Pakistani War of 1971, the US President, Richard Nixon, sent a carrier battle group, named Task Force 74, led by the nuclear-powered USS Enterprise into the international waters of the Bay of Bengal in a show of force. Task Force 74 remained in international waters, where it was legally entitled to be. The records of Nixon-Kissinger communications show no contingency nor any plan under which Enterprise would enter Indian or Pakistani waters, or otherwise intervene in the conflict but it is well known that the duo viewed Pakistan as a strong ally in that region and were silent on the Bangladesh genocide committed by Pakistani military. In response, the Soviet Union sent a submarine armed with nuclear missiles from Vladivostok to trail the US task force in support of India. The event demonstrated the significance of nuclear weapons and ballistic missile submarines to the then Indian Prime Minister, Indira Gandhi. Following the Smiling Buddha nuclear test in 1974, the Director of Marine Engineering (DME) at Naval Headquarters initiated a technical feasibility study for an indigenous nuclear propulsion system for a submarine by a small task force, led by a Commander-ranked officer, under Project 932 in coordination with the Department of Atomic Energy (DAE).

The Indian Navy's Advanced Technology Vessel project to design and construct a nuclear submarine took shape in the 1990s. Then Defence Minister George Fernandes confirmed the project in 1998. The initial intent of the project was to design nuclear-powered fast attack submarines, though following nuclear tests conducted by India in 1998 at Pokhran Test Range and the Indian pledge of no first use, the project was re-aligned towards the design of a ballistic missile submarine in order to complete India's nuclear triad.

== Description ==
Conceptual drawing of INS Arihant

=== General characteristics ===
The first two submarines are 111.6 m (366 ft) long with a beam of 11 m (36 ft), a draught of 15 m (49 ft), displacement of 6,000 tonnes (5,900 long tons; 6,600 short tons). The latter submarines included an additional 10 m (33 ft)-long section of four launch tubes increasing the displacement by 1,000 tonnes (980 long tons; 1,100 short tons). The complement is about 95, including officers and sailors. The submarines, being constructed at the Ship Building Centre (SBC), Visakhapatnam using a US HY-80 grade equivalent Russian steel, has two compartments including propulsion and combat management systems, platform management centre, and the torpedo room. The vessels feature a double hull encompassing ballast tanks, two standby auxiliary engines, and a retractable thruster for emergency power and mobility.

=== Propulsion system ===
The boats are powered by a single seven blade propeller powered by an 82.5 MWe-rated pressurised light-water reactor (PWR) powered by highly enriched uranium fuel. and can achieve a maximum speed of 12–15 knots (22–28 km/h) when surfaced and 24 knots (44 km/h) when submerged.

=== Weapon systems ===
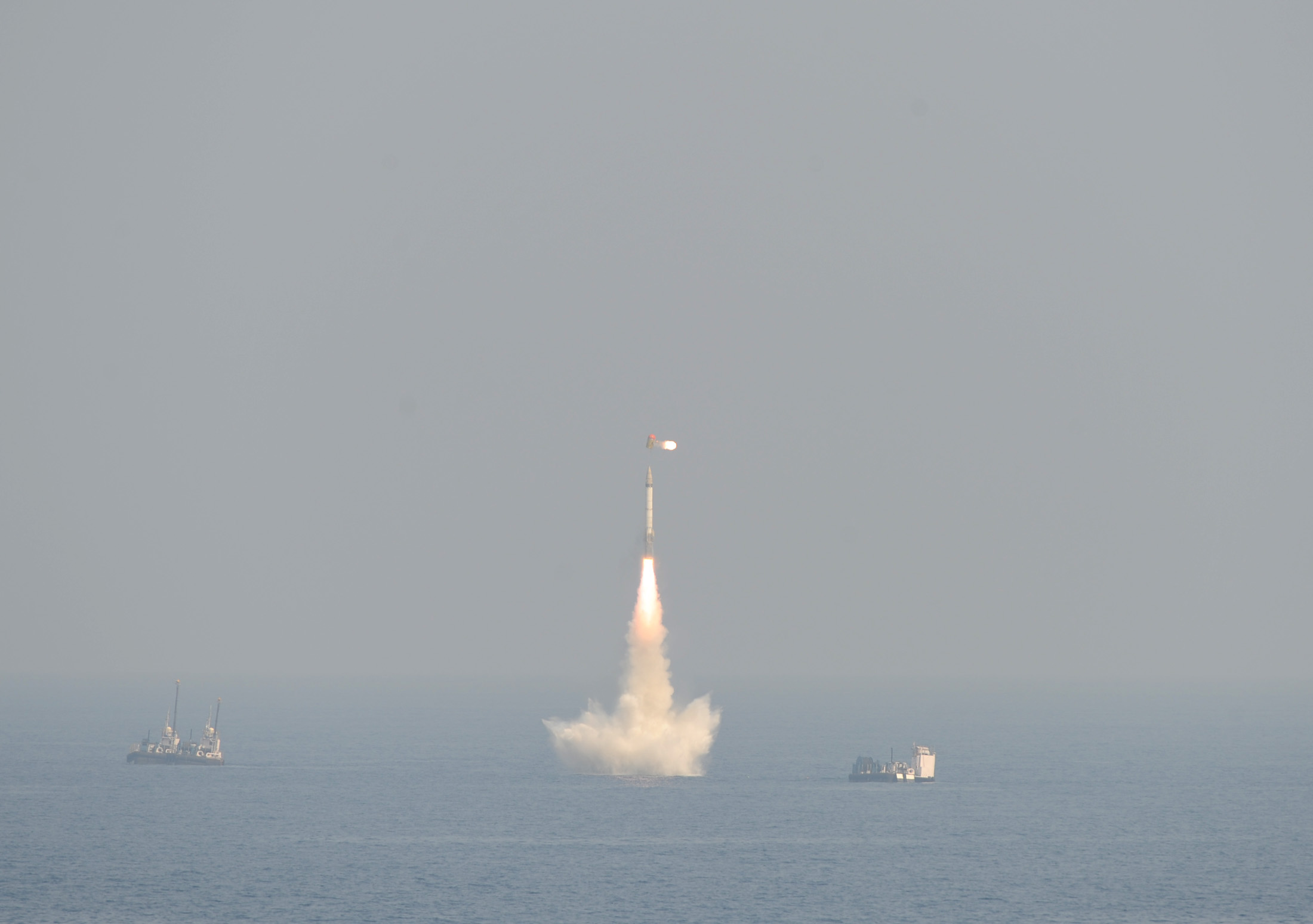
Sagarika SLBM

The initial batch of two submarines have four launch tubes in their hump and can carry up to twelve K-15 Sagarika missiles with one warhead each (with a range of 750 km or 470 mi) or four K-4 missiles (with a range of 3,500 km or 2,200 mi). The third and fourth submarines, featuring Arihant Stretch design, will have a larger configuration, carrying twenty-four K-15 Sagarika or eight K-4 missiles, due to the addition of four launch tubes. The Indian Navy personnel received training on INS Chakra, an Akula-class submarine leased from Russia in 2012.

The submarine's K-15 missiles can reach most of Pakistan and its K-4 can target all of Pakistan. The K-4 may also be capable of targeting Beijing, but would need to be in the northern most waters of Bay of Bengal. Deployment of the Arihant to the Pacific Ocean is unlikely given the submarine's noise issues.

Prior to her retirement in 2003, INS Karanj served as trials as platform for validating the command and communication systems for the Arihant class including the Rani and Pachendriya sonar equipment.

== Development ==
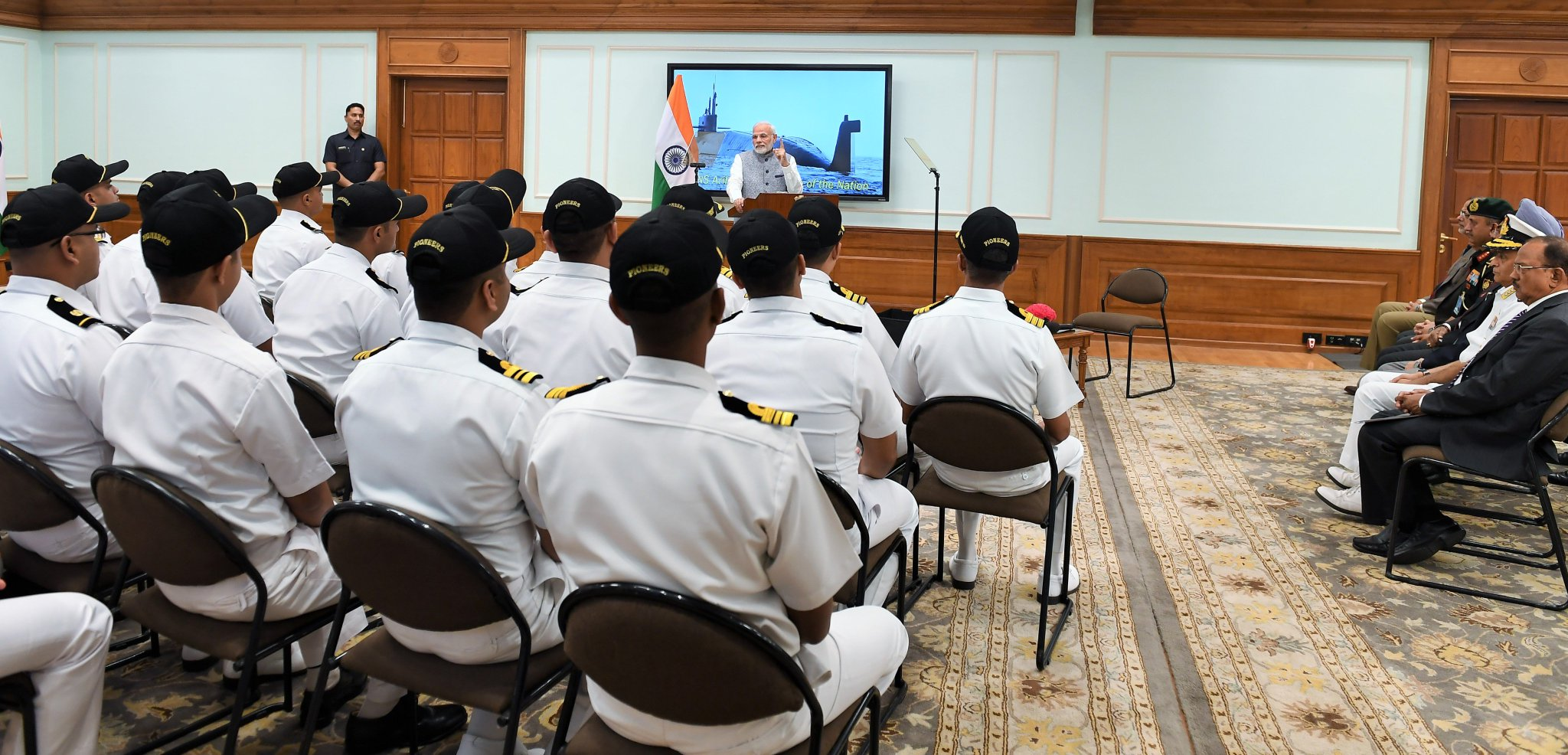
PM Narendra Modi addressing the crew of INS Arihant. Note the picture of the submarine in the background.

The Arihant-class submarines are nuclear-powered ballistic missile submarines built under the Advanced Technology Vessel (ATV) project. Originally, three submarines were authorised under the ATV project, at a cost of ₹30,000 crore (US$6.2 billion), which itself is part of a larger programme to construct five nuclear submarines for the Indian Navy. Later, a fourth submarine was added. These are the first nuclear submarines designed and built by India. The overall project cost had hiked to ₹90,000 crore (US$13.82 billion) by 2017.

The classified project is headquartered in New Delhi and remains under direct supervision of the Prime Minister's Office and the National Security Advisor. Larsen & Toubro undertook critical detailed engineering based on design provided by the Navy and DRDO at its submarine design centre. The firm was also the single largest contributor to the programme ranging from the steel cutting of the submarines to their launch. The facility served as the site for hull construction. Tata Power SED built the control systems for the submarine. The steam turbines and associated systems integrated with the reactor were supplied by Walchandnagar Industries. Former Prime Minister of India, Manmohan Singh, had lauded ATV project as a "productive public–private partnership".

On 24 December 2009, the Hindustan Shipyard, located at Visakhapatnam, was transferred from the Ministry of Shipping to the Ministry of Defence to support the construction of Arihant-class submarine programme. This would help in utilising the shipyard's infrastructure in the project.

=== Prototype light water reactor ===
The miniaturised version of the reactor was designed and built by the Bhabha Atomic Research Centre (BARC) at the Indira Gandhi Centre for Atomic Research (IGCAR) in Kalpakkam. It included a 42-metre (138 ft) section of the submarine's pressure hull containing the shielding tank with water and the reactor, a control room, as well as an auxiliary control room for monitoring safety parameters. The prototype reactor became critical on 11 November 2003 and was declared operational on 22 September 2006. Successful operation of the prototype for three years enabled the production version of the reactor for Arihant. The reactor subsystems were tested at the Machinery Test Center in Visakhapatnam. Facilities for loading and replacing the fuel cores of the naval reactors in berthed submarines were also established. The prototype 83 MW light water reactor that was installed at Kalpakkam by BARC is codenamed S1 and is used to train nuclear submariners.

== Project timeline ==
=== 1970–2000 ===
- 1974: The nuclear submarine project was sanctioned following the Smiling Buddha tests under the then Prime Minister, Indira Gandhi.
- 1983: Additional funds were allotted for the project during the Fourth Indira Gandhi ministry.
- 1998: A. P. J. Abdul Kalam cut the first steel for the submarine hull at the Larsen & Toubro facility at Hazira. L&T had received the submarine hull construction contract. Simultaneously, the submarine's design was upgraded from nuclear attack profile to nuclear-powered ballistic missile submarine following Pokhran-II.

=== 2001–10 ===
- 2006: A high-level committee led by R. Chidambaram, the then principal scientific advisor to the Government of India, assessed India's ability to construct three S5 series of SSBNs. The project, with a budget of ₹10,000 crore (US$2.21 billion), was assigned to DRDO, BARC and the ATV headquarters. The construction would tentatively begin in 2015 followed with the first submarine to be deployed in 2021. The projected specifications included a displacement of 13,500 t (13,300 long tons; 14,900 short tons), 12 VLS with an MIRV-equipped SLBM with a range of 6,000 km (3,700 mi). The missile later evolved as K-6 ballistic missile.
- 2007: The then finance minister, P. Chidambaram, member of the political committee monitoring the ATV programme, questioned the huge amount of money being spent on submarines with just 4 missile launch tubes. Thereafter, the ATV project team evolved the design into Arihant-stretch. The improved design incorporated a 10-metre-long section for four more missile tubes to be equipped with K-4 SLBMs. This design would be applied to S4 boat. The boat would then have capacity for 24 B-05 short-range or 8 K-4 long-range missiles.
- 12 February 2009: The Advanced Technology Vessel project, meant to deliver three submarines, is part of a $2.9 billion programme to build five nuclear submarines. As per the then Defence Minister, A. K. Antony, the first submarine was in the final stages of construction after supply chain bottlenecks were cleared and DRDO was already developing submarine-launched ballistic missile. The project was conceived in 1970s and operationalised in 1980s, though public acknowledgement never came from official sources until this announcement by the defence minister. There were delays to miniaturise the nuclear reactor core for the submarine and Russian technology help was sought to solve the issues without delays. Another factor that resulted in delays was lack of metallurgical expertise and lack of experience of Indian hull makers on the chosen material for the submarine. The successful development of a nuclear submarine came after two failed attempts in the 1970s and 1980s.
- 16 July 2009: Multiple reports suggested that the first vessel under the Advanced Technology Vessel would be launched by Gursharan Kaur, the wife of the then Prime Minister, Manmohan Singh, on 26 July 2009. The ceremony would be held in Naval Dockyard (Visakhapatnam). The vessel was named INS Arihant, meaning "destroyer of enemies". The design is based on Charlie-I submarines, while both the displacement and submerged speed are higher than the Charlie-I designs. While being launched, the dry dock in the Shipbuilding Centre in Visakhapatnam will be flooded and the submarine would be moved out of the SBC. The vessel would be then towed to a nearby pier for harbour trials during which, the nuclear power plant and auxiliary systems would be validated before its sea trials in the Bay of Bengal. The submarine was expected to be commissioned within two to three years. Meanwhile, hull sections of two additional ATVs have been completed in the Hazira facility of Larsen & Toubro and are to be transported to the SBC soon after Arihant exits the dock space.
- 26 July 2009: The first submarine of the class, Arihant, was launched into the water. The launch took place after three decades of initiating the design stage of the project. The Defence Minister would also attended the event. The harbour acceptance and system trials was scheduled for one year. The submarine was built at a cost of $2.9 billion. Meanwhile, many expected that the operationalisation of the submarine would take much longer than two years. Harbour acceptance trials and followed by sea acceptance trials, including the surface and sub-surface domains, respectively, were to be conducted before commissioning the submarine. Even the nuclear reactor was yet to be fitted onboard and would be followed by the reactor reaching criticality, which would be a milestone. The submarine, equipped with Sagarika missiles, would serve as a technology demonstrator for the following nuclear submarines.

=== 2011–20 ===
- 2012: Another Arihant-class submarine was cleared for production to avoid idling of the production line since the S5 project remaining in developmental stage. The new unit, designated as S4* (between S4 and S5), would also feature the Arihant Stretch design.
- 9 August 2014: The submarine's nuclear reactor became critical for the maiden time after four years of harbour acceptance patrol. The Navy wanted the submarine ready for deterrent patrol in 2014. Meanwhile, the second submarine was already at an advanced stage of construction at the SBC and could be launched in a year later.
- 13 December 2014: Arihant was entered sea for the first time after being flagged off for extensive sea trials following harbour trials. The sea acceptance trials for the submarine was initially slated for February 2012.
- 25 November 2015: A dummy or unarmed B-05 Sagarika missile was successfully test fired from INS Arihant from a depth of 20 metres.
- 31 March 2016: The K-4 missile was successfully tested from INS Arihant, 45 nautical miles away from the Vishakhapatnam coast. The missile with a dummy payload was launched from the submarine in full operational configuration. The trial was carried out with the support of the personnel of Strategic Forces Command (SFC) while the DRDO provided all the logistics.
- August 2016: The first boat of the class, INS Arihant, was commissioned.
- 19 November 2017: The second submarine, christened Arighaat, was launched by the then defence minister, Nirmala Sitharaman, with a low-profile, traditional ceremony. The vessel was floated out after flooding the drydock. Reportedly, commissioning of the vessel would take three years. It has an indigenous content of 60%. The third (S4) and fourth (S4*) submarine, with eight launcher units, was expected to be launched in 2020 and 2022, respectively.
- July 2018: The submarine was reportedly ready to be fully operationalised with several weapons firing trials and deep diving trials off the coast of Visakhapatnam having been completed since five months earlier. The submarine was being accompanied by RFS Epron, a Russian-origin Prut-class submarine rescue ship which arrived in India on 1 October 2017.
- 11–12 August 2018: The B-05 missile system was fired twice on 11th and once on 12th of August from INS Arihant and was operationalised two decades since the missile systems development commenced. All the missiles followed the designated trajectories and were fired 10 km away from Visakhapatnam from a depth of 20 m.
- 4 November 2018: Arihant completed its first deterrence patrol for 20 days.

=== 2021–present ===
- 2020–21: Arighaat conducted harbour trials in 2020 and, during August 2021, was expected to commence sea trials later the same year.
- 23 November 2021: A report citing the Jane's Defence Weekly magazine dated 29 December indicated that INS Aridhaman had been launched. The boat had been moved towards the ‘fitting-out wharf’ which was occupied by Arighaat, awaiting to be commissioned. The programme was facing a delay amid the COVID-19 pandemic in India. Aridhaman, the first Arihant stretch submarine, was originally expected to be launched by 2020. The stretched variant measured 125.4 m (411 ft) against the original design of 111.6 m (366 ft) length.
- 2022: Aridhaman begun sea trials.
- 11 August 2024: Arighaat was being prepared for being commissioned within two months.
- 29 August 2024: Arighaat was commissioned in the presence of the Defence Minister, Rajnath Singh. A report suggested that Aridhaman would be commissioned within 6 months.
- 16 October 2024: The fourth and final submarine of the class, with an indigenous content of 75% and equipped with K4 missiles, was launched.
- 2 December 2025: Aridhaman had entered the final stages of trials and was expected to be commissioned soon.
- 30 December 2025: The fourth submarine, S4*, had reportedly departed the harbour for sea trials a week earlier and is expected to be commissioned in early 2027. Meanwhile, Aridhaman, the third unit had completed its sea trials a few weeks ago and is now to be commissioned in early 2026 after being delivered.
- 5 January 2026: A report suggested that the final submarine, so far referred to as S4*, will be named INS Arisudan. The name has been proposed by the ship-naming committee of the Indian Navy. The name is yet to be receive clearance by the defence ministry and eventually, the President of India, who is also the Supreme Commander of the Armed Forces.
- 3 April 2026: INS Aridhaman was commissioned.

== Boats of the class ==
Name	Pennant	Subclass	Displacement (surfaced)	Laid down	Launch	Sea trials begin	Sea trials completed	Commissioned	Status
Arihant (S2)	SSBN 80	Arihant subclass	6,000 tonnes	2004	26 July 2009	13 December 2014	23 February 2016	August 2016	Active
Arighaat (S3)	SSBN 81	Arihant subclass	6,000 tonnes	2009	19 November 2017	Q4 2021	—N/a	29 August 2024	Active
Aridhaman (S4)	SSBN 82	Aridhaman subclass	7,000 tonnes	2018	23 November 2021	2022	December 2025	3 April 2026	Active
Arisudan (S4*)	SSBN 83	Aridhaman subclass	7,000 tonnes	2020	16 October 2024	December 2025		2027 (expected)	Sea trials

== Timeline ==
Date	Event
19 May 1998	Confirmation of ATV project by the then Defence Minister George Fernandes
11 November 2003	Prototype nuclear reactor becomes critical
22 September 2006	Nuclear reactor is declared operational
2007	Design of S4 is modified to allow four more launch tubes.
26 July 2009	Lead vessel of the class, INS Arihant, is formally launched
2012	Additional unit S4* is cleared to avoid idling of production line.
10 August 2013	Arihant's on-board nuclear reactor attains criticality
13 December 2014	INS Arihant begins extensive sea & weapons trials
25 November 2015	INS Arihant successfully test-fired dummy B5 missile
31 March 2016	INS Arihant successfully test-fired K4 missile
August 2016	INS Arihant commissioned.
19 November 2017	INS Arighaat launched
8 January 2018	INS Arighaat to begin sea trials
5 November 2018	INS Arihant completed its first deterrence patrol
March 2021	INS Arighaat's sea trials are completed.
November 2021	INS Aridhaman is speculated to be launched.
29 August 2024	INS Arighaat officially commissioned.
16 October 2024	S4* launched
3 April 2026	INS Aridhaman was commissioned.

== See also ==
- Future of the Indian Navy
- List of active Indian Navy ships
- List of submarines of the Indian Navy
- List of submarine classes in service
- Submarine-launched ballistic missile
