= Ships of the Indian Navy =

Ships of the Indian Navy may refer to:

- List of active Indian Navy ships, list of commissioned ships of the Indian Navy
- List of historical ships of the Indian Navy, list of historical ships of the Indian Navy
