= Advanced Systems Laboratory =

Indian defence laboratory

- Director: Dr. M. Raghavendra Rao
- Location: Hyderabad, Telangana, India
- Operating agency: DRDO
- Website: https://www.drdo.gov.in/labs-and-establishments/advanced-systems-laboratory-asl

The Advanced Systems Laboratory (ASL) is an Indian defence laboratory of the Defence Research and Development Organisation (DRDO). Located in Hyderabad, Telangana, it conducts research on Solid Propulsion Technologies, Composites, Aerospace Mechanisms, NDT Techniques, System Design and Analysis, Mission Design and Studies, Guidance Design and Control Systems. The director of ASL is Dr. M. Raghavendra Rao, a missile propulsion and aeronautical systems expert known for his contributions to the Integrated Guided Missile Development Programme (IGMDP).
