= INS Arihant =

Indian nuclear powered submarine

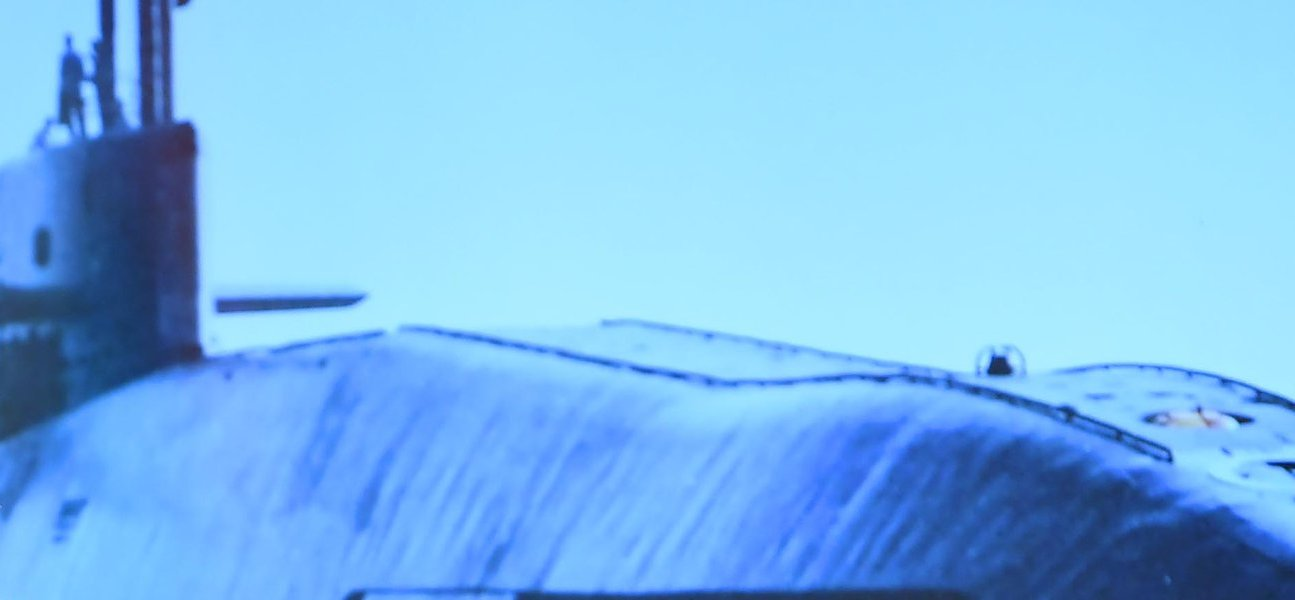
- INS Arihant

History

India
- Name: INS Arihant
- Namesake: Sanskrit for "Conqueror"
- Builder: Shipbuilding Centre, Visakhapatnam, India
- Laid down: 2004
- Launched: 26 July 2009
- Acquired: 13 December 2014
- Commissioned: August 2016
- Status: in active service

General characteristics
- Class & type: Arihant-class ballistic missile submarine
- Displacement: Surface: 6,000 tonnes
- Length: 111 m (364 ft)
- Beam: 15 m (49 ft)
- Draft: 11 m (36 ft)
- Propulsion: 1 x CLWR-B1 Compact 83 MW Light-water reactor one turbine; one shaft; one 7-bladed, high-skew propeller
- Speed: Submerged: 24 kn (44 km/h; 28 mph); Surfaced: 15 kn (28 km/h; 17 mph)
- Range: unlimited except by food supplies
- Test depth: 350 m (1,150 ft) (estimated)
- Complement: 95–100 officers and men
- Sensors & processing systems: USHUS sonar; Panchendriya sonar suite
- Armament: 6 × 533 mm (21.0 in) torpedo tubes (est. 30 charges); 4 VLS cells for; 12 × K-15 Sagarika SLBM (or); 4 × K-4 SLBM

INS Arihant (SSBN 80) (lit. 'Conqueror'), is the lead ship of Indian Navy's Arihant class of nuclear-powered ballistic missile submarines. The vessel was built under the Advanced Technology Vessel project at the Ship Building Centre in Visakhapatnam. The submarine was launched on 26 July 2009, and after fitting out and extensive sea trials, she was commissioned in August 2016, and deployed operationally in 2018.

== Design ==
Conceptual drawing of INS Arihant

INS Arihant is the first of the five planned Arihant class submarines designed and constructed as a part of the Indian Navy's Advanced Technology Vessel (ATV) project launched in 1984. The design of the submarine is based on the Soviet designed Akula-class submarine, one of which was under the service of the Indian Navy under the name INS Chakra. As per the Indian Navy, Arihant is intended to be more of "a technology demonstrator" than a fully operational ballistic missile submarine.

The vessel is powered by an 83 MW pressurized water reactor and uses enriched uranium fuel. It is based on a land-based prototype that was built at the Madras Atomic Power Station at Kalpakkam and made operational in September 2006. The reactor was built at the Bhabha Atomic Research Centre, with Russian aid in miniaturising the reactor to fit into the hull of the nuclear submarine. The submarine has a double hull design, and the hull was built by the Larsen & Toubro shipbuilding facility at Hazira. Tata Power SED built the control systems for the submarine, and the steam turbine system was supplied by Walchandnagar Industries. Consultancy was provided by Russia.

=== Armament ===
The Arihant has four vertical launch torpedo tubes, which can carry up to 12 (three per tube) K-15 missiles or four K-4 missiles. The K-15 missile possesses a range of 750 km (470 mi), and the K-4 missile has a longer range of 3,500 km (2,200 mi), and had commenced trials in 2014.

== Development and launch ==
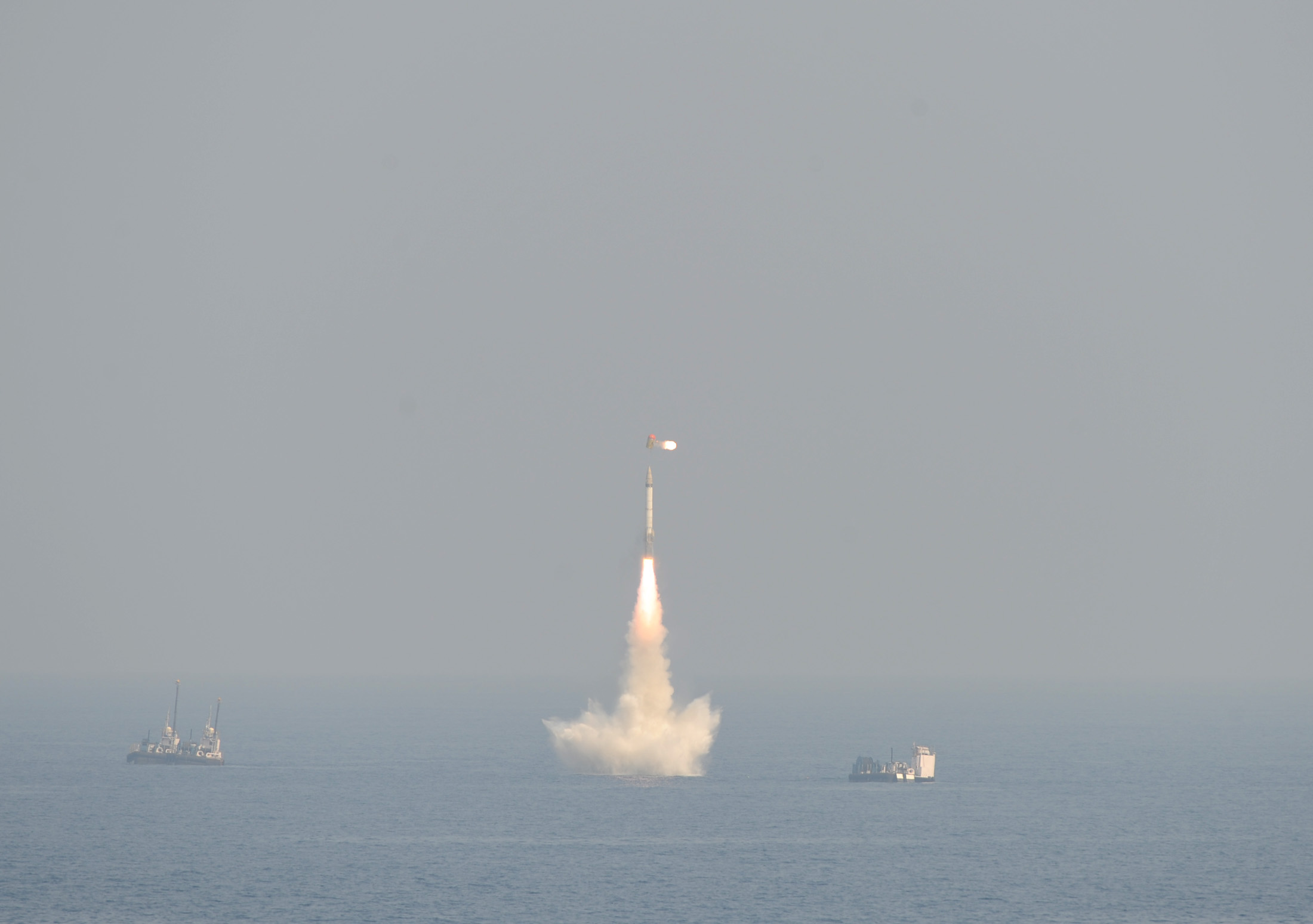
K-15 missile launched from Arihant

The construction of the submarine began in the early 2000s, with the nuclear reactor integrated into the hull in January 2008. The Arihant was introduced to the public at a symbolic launch ceremony on 26 July 2009, on the 10th anniversary of the conclusion of the Kargil War. The vessel was floated by flooding the dry dock at Visakhapatnam, in the presence of Indian prime minister Manmohan Singh. It was expected that the integration of systems, and sea trials would take further three to five years. On 7 August 2012, the Chief of the Naval Staff told that sea trials of the submarine would commence in the coming months, and she was progressing towards operationalisation.

On 27 January 2013, the K-15 missile completed its final developmental tests and was integrated with the submarine. On 10 August 2013, the nuclear reactor of the submarine went critical, after the reactor's was slowly power until it reached full power. On 13 December 2014, the Arihant sailed north along the Bay of Bengal coast for its sea based trials. On 25 November 2015, an unarmed K-15 missile was successfully test-fired from the submarine. The sea trials were completed by early February 2016. In August 2016, prime minister Narendra Modi commissioned the Arihant into the Indian Navy, which completed India's nuclear triad.

== Operational history ==
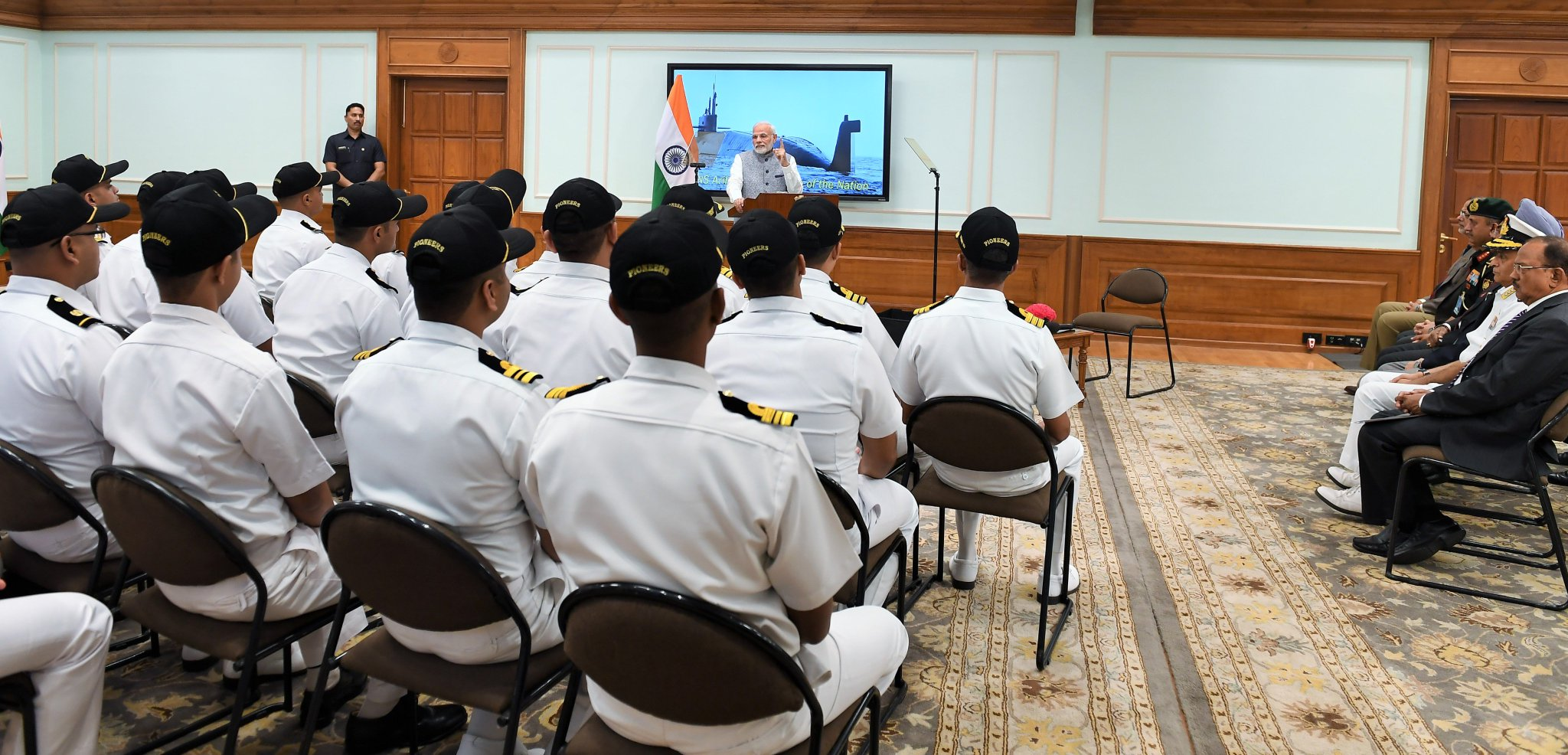
Indian prime minister Narendra Modi addressing the crew of INS Arihant

In January 2018, it was reported that an aft hatch on the submarine was left open by mistake while the submarine was docked in 2017, leading to saltwater flooding the propulsion compartment, rendering the submarine inoperative for ten months while the corroded pipes were replaced. The Indian defence ministry refused to comment on the allegation, claiming it would be a breach of national security. In the aftermath of the allegations, there was conflicting information about if the flood could have actually occurred due to the design of the submarine and location of hatches.

On 5 November 2018, the Indian Navy announced that that INS Arihant had completed its first 20-day long deterrent patrol the previous day. Prime minister Modi met with the crew of the submarine after the successful completion of the first patrol.

On 14 October 2022, INS Arihant successfully launched an SLBM with a predetermined range and hit the target area in the Bay of Bengal with accuracy. As per a defence ministry source, the missile launched was a K-15 Sagarika missile.

== See also ==
- INS Arighaat, second submarine in the Arihant class
- INS Varsha, home-port of the INS Arihant
- List of active Indian Navy ships
- Submarines of the Indian Navy
