= Sagarika (missile) =

Indian short-range submarine-launched ballistic missile

Sagarika (K-15 or B-05)
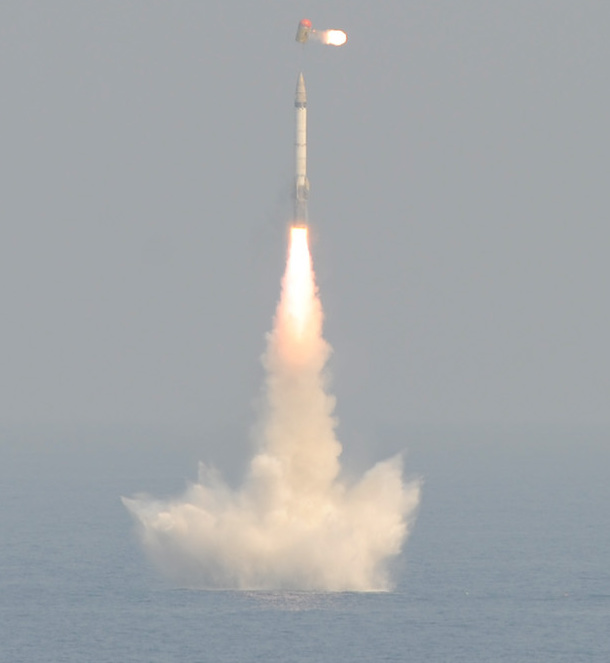
- A Sagarika flight test on 27 January 2013.
- Type: Short-range submarine launched ballistic missile
- Place of origin: India

Service history
- In service: August 2018
- Used by: Indian Navy

Production history
- Designer: Defence Research and Development Organisation
- Manufacturer: Bharat Dynamics Limited

Specifications
- Mass: 6–7 t (6.6–7.7 short tons)
- Length: 10 m (33 ft)
- Diameter: 0.74 m (2.4 ft)
- Warhead: High explosive or nuclear warhead
- Warhead weight: 1,000 kg (2,200 lb)
- Engine: Two stage solid-fuel rocket motor
- Propellant: Solid propellant
- Operational range: 750–1,500 km (470–930 mi)
- Maximum speed: Mach 7.5 (Shaurya missile, which is land-based version of Sagarika K-15 missile)
- Guidance system: Mid-course: INS + multi-GNSS; Terminal: TERCOM
- Accuracy: <10 m
- Launch platform: Arihant-class submarines, S5-class submarines

Sagarika (pronounced: sɑːgərikɑː) (lit. 'Oceanic'), also known by the code names K-15 or B-05 or PJ-08, is an Indian submarine-launched ballistic missile (SLBM) with a range of 750 kilometres (466 mi) that was designed for retaliatory nuclear strikes. It belongs to the K Missile family and forms a part of India's nuclear triad.

== Description ==
The K-15 is a two-stage submarine-launched ballistic missile which uses a gas booster to eject out of its launch platform and rise up to the surface of water. A solid rocket motor is fired after the missile reaches a fixed altitude. The missile has a range of around 750 kilometres (466 mi).

== Development ==
Development of the K-15 missile started in the late 1990s with the goal of building a submarine-launched ballistic missile for use with the Indian Navy's nuclear-powered Arihant-class submarines. It was developed at the Defence Research and Development Organisation’s (DRDO) missile complex in Hyderabad. Early US reports indicated that India had actively sought Russian particapation, but eventually developed the missile in-house.

The development of the underwater missile launcher, known as Project 420, was completed in 2001 and handed over to the Indian Navy for trials. The missile launcher is developed at Hazira in Gujarat. The Sagarika missile began integration with India's nuclear-powered Arihant-class submarine that began harbour trials on 26 July 2009.

The missile was fully operationalised in August 2018.

== Testing ==
- By 2008, the missile was successfully test fired seven times, and tested to its full range up to four times. The tests of 26 February 2008, were conducted from a submerged pontoon 50 metres (160 ft) beneath the surface off the coast of Visakhapatnam.
- A land-based version of the K-15 Sagarika was successfully test-fired on 12 November 2008.
- A full range test of the missile was done on 11 March 2012.
- The missile was test fired on 26 December 2012 in full operational configuration after being delayed from November. Though two tests were scheduled, one from a pontoon and other from a live submarine, the latter task was cancelled and scheduled for a later day the following year. The missile was fired from a depth of 20-40 m with the help of a gas generator and reached an altitude of 20 km (12 mi). It was tested at a range of 650 km (400 mi) during its 11th developmental trial. A.K. Chakrabarti was the then Programme Director of the K-15 programme and was also the Director of the Defence Research and Development Laboratory (DRDL).
- The twelfth and final development trial of the missiles was conducted on 27 January 2013. According to DRDO Director General V. K. Saraswat, the missile was again tested for its full range of 700 km and met all its objectives with a single digit impact-accuracy. The test will be followed by integration of the missile with INS Arihant.
- On 25 November 2015, a dummy or unarmed K-15 Sagarika missile was successfully test fired from INS Arihant.
- The missile was tested for a total of three times on 11 and 12 August 12, 2018. This completed the first phase of user trials of the missile.
- A successful user training trial was conducted on 14 October 2022 from INS Arihant to impart training to its crew members operating such SBMs.

== Operators ==
India

- Indian Navy

== See also ==
=== Comparable missiles ===
- Hyunmoo 4-4 – (South Korea)
- Hwasong-11S
- Pukguksong-1 – (North Korea)
- JL-1 – (China)
- R-21 – (Soviet Union)

=== India's related developments ===
- K Missile family
- Arihant-class submarine
- K-4 (SLBM)
- LR-ASHM
