= K-4 (missile) =

Indian submarine-launched missile

- Type: Intermediate-range SLBM
- Place of origin: India

Service history
- In service: August 2024
- Used by: Indian Navy

Production history
- Designer: Defence Research and Development Organisation
- Manufacturer: Bharat Dynamics Limited

Specifications
- Mass: 17 t (19 short tons)
- Length: 12 m (39 ft)
- Diameter: 1.3 m (4.3 ft)
- Warhead: Strategic nuclear weapon
- Warhead weight: 2,500 kg (5,500 lb)
- Engine: Two stage solid rocket motor
- Propellant: Solid rocket propellant
- Operational range: 3,500 km (2,200 mi)
- Guidance system: Mid-course: INS + multi-GNSS; Terminal: TERCOM
- Launch platform: Arihant-class submarines

K-4 or Kalam-4 is a nuclear capable intermediate-range submarine-launched ballistic missile developed by the Defence Research and Development Organisation of India to arm its Arihant-class submarines. The missile has a maximum range of about 3,500 km which offers greater operational flexibility compared to its predecessor K-15 having a limited shore-bounding range. On deployment, the missile will be the first to operationalise India's sea-based nuclear triad and can accommodate the demand of credible second-strike capability of its nuclear doctrine.

The Arihant and Arighaat have four vertical launching system for the missile while Aridhaman and S4* submarines have double the number of vertical launching system. The latter three submarines will be equipped with K4 missiles while Arihant is equipped with B-05 missiles. The missile completed developmental launch trials and reportedly entered serial production after a final two consecutive launch trials in January 2020 within a gap of six days. On August 29, 2024, the missile was commissioned into the Indian Navy. In September 2024, ANI reported the deployment of the missile onboard the Arighaat, several days past her commissioning.

== Development ==
The importance of submarine launched nuclear weapon capability has been recognised early due to its inherent flexibility, survivability and secrecy which aligned well with India's no first use and credible minimum deterrence policy. The first indigenous SSBN was launched in 2009 and was commissioned seven years later as INS Arihant. Concerns related to the limited range of K-15 ballistic missile operationalised by the submarine was addressed gradually with the development of a higher range version.

Test launch of the K-4 in March 2014. The missile traversed 3000 km into Indian Ocean

In January 2010, the K-4 was secretly tested off Vishakhapatnam. The 10 metre long and 1.3 metre wide 'black and white' missile emerged from a pontoon submerged 50 metre underwater and breached the surface. A second firing was also conducted in Visakhapatnam which has revalidated the critical ability of a 20-tonne projectile to withstand 50 kg of water pressure and eject from a submerged launcher before engaging its rocket booster.

=== Agencies responsible ===
The High Energy Material Research Laboratory (HEMRL) and the Advanced Centre for Energetic Materials (ACEM) of the DRDO have been involved in developing the three motors responsible for propelling the K-4, the systems responsible for separating the stages of K-4, the low-thrust boosters, the gas generator and other components. The launch system of K-4 has been developed by the Naval Systems Group of the Research and Development Establishment (Engineers).

== Description ==
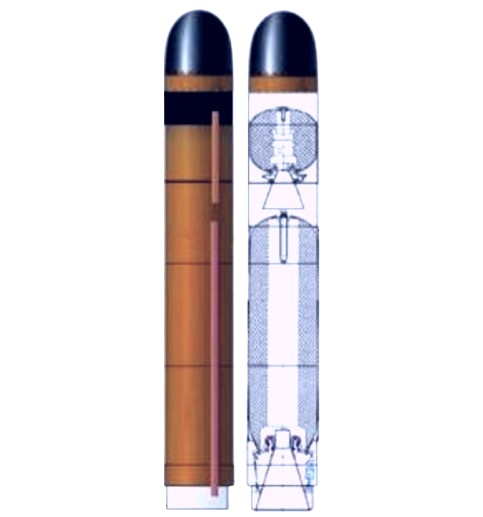
Conceptual render of K-4

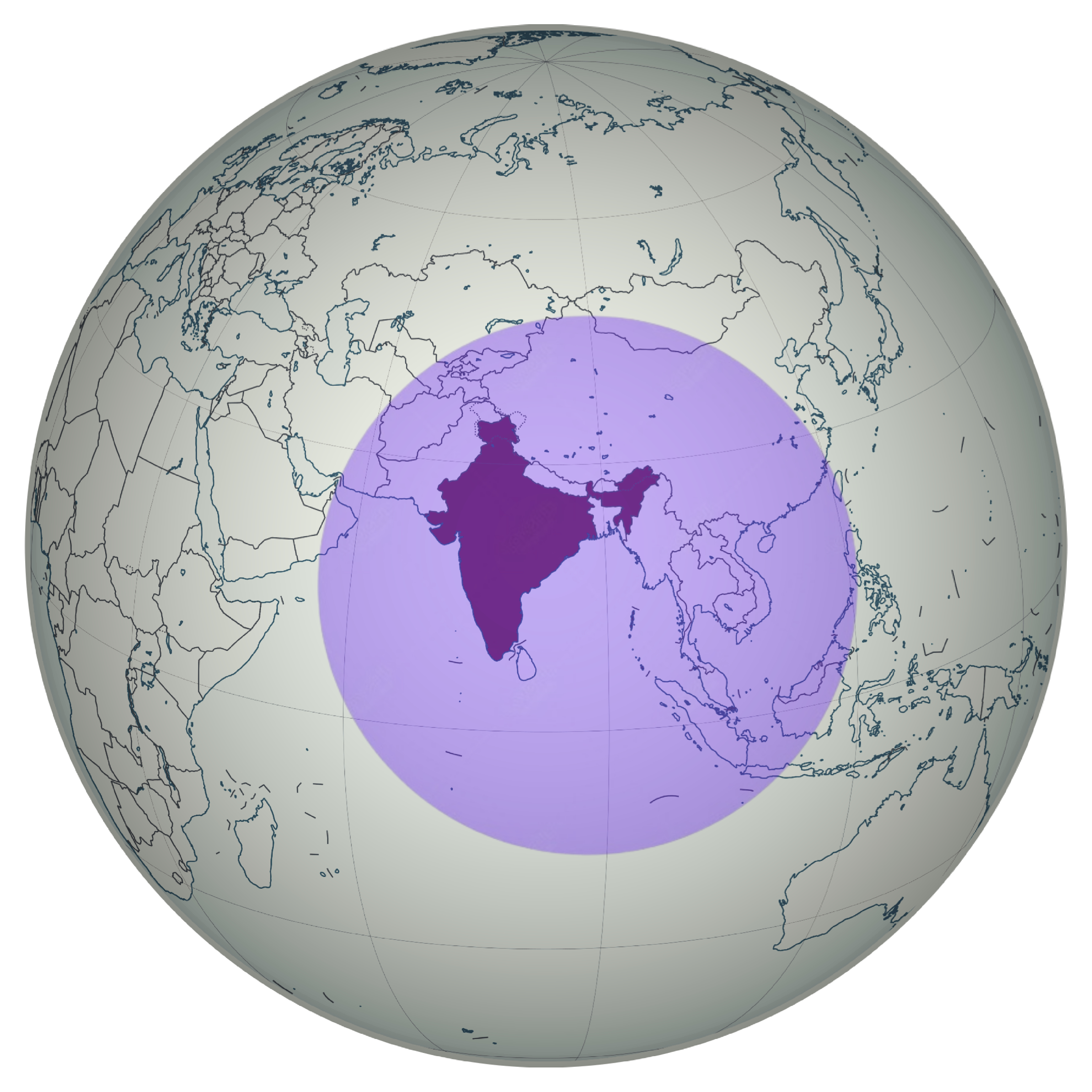
3500 km range envelope from Bay of Bengal

The K-4 is a submarine-launched ballistic missile which is composed of two stages. The missile is reported to be 12 metres (39 ft) long with a diameter of 1.3 metres (4 ft 3 in) and weighs nearly 17 tonnes (19 tons). It can carry a warhead weighing up to 2 tonnes (2.2 tons) and is powered solid rocket propellant. The DRDO stated that the aim of the missile was to achieve a high accuracy. As a countermeasure against ballistic missile defence systems, the K4 can perform three-dimensional maneuvers.

Specifications

- Range (exact is classified):
  Full load: ~3,000 kilometres (1,900 mi)
  Reduced load: ~4,000 kilometres (2,500 mi)
- Guidance system: Inertial navigation system with GPS/NavIC satellite guidance
- Circular error probable: <10 metres (33 ft). (Alleged)

The K-4 uses a powerful nose mounted motor which has two diametrically opposite mounted nozzles which fires underwater and enable the transition of missile through water, break the surface and continue the ascend into the atmosphere for the first few seconds. The gases ejected from this system is expected to create a gas bubble encapsulation around the missile which will reduce the drag during underwater transition. During the ascent into atmosphere, the four control surfaces at the base of the missile provide the necessary aerodynamic control to the missile.

After the burnout of the nose mounted motor, the base shroud at the bottom of the missile housing the control surfaces and control actuation system is ejected. The first stage will ignite to coincide with the burnout and ejection of nose mounted motor to prevent zero thrust condition. The flex nozzle control of the first stage will provide necessary steering during boost phase. The airflow pattern over the nose cone of the missile is reminiscent of the one seen of blunt nose cones or nose cones with an aerospike which will reduce drag and heat load significantly.

== Testing ==
K-4 SLBM launch log
Flight No.	Launch date and site	Platform and Depth	Range	Function	Outcome
1	15 January 2010 Visakhapatnam Coast	Underwater Pontoon; 50 m (160 ft)		Developmental launch	Success
The test validated the ability of a 20-tonne projectile to withstand 50 kg of water pressure and eject from a submerged launcher before engaging its rocket booster.
2	24 March 2014 Visakhapatnam Coast	Underwater Pontoon; 30 m (98 ft)	3,000 km (1,900 mi)	First test launch	Success
After a powerful gas generator ejected it from the submerged pontoon, the K-4 missile rose into the air, took a turn towards the designated target, sped across 3,000 km in the sky and dropped into the Indian Ocean.
3	07 March 2016 Visakhapatnam Coast	Underwater Pontoon		Second test launch Depressed trajectory	Success
The K-4 missile was fired at a depressed trajectory. Starting from successfully clearing the launch tube and breaking the water surface to stage separation and maintaining the ballistic trajectory, the missile achieved all parameters before zeroing in on the pre-designated target with high accuracy.
4	31 March 2016 Visakhapatnam Coast	INS Arihant; 20 m (66 ft)	700 km (430 mi)	Third test launch Submarine trial of K-4	Success
The missile was successfully tested from Arihant, 45 nautical miles away from the Vishakhapatnam coast. The missile with a dummy payload was launched from the submarine in full operational configuration. The trial was carried out with the support of the personnel of Strategic Forces Command (SFC) and the DRDO provided all the logistics.
5	17 December 2017 Visakhapatnam Coast	Underwater Pontoon		Fourth test launch	Failure
K-4 missile did not activate during the test, with its battery getting drained after the launch command was given. It is believed that DRDO scientists were even unable to retrieve the missile from the test pontoon following the failure.
6	19 January 2020 Visakhapatnam Coast	Underwater Pontoon	3,500 km (2,200 mi)	Fifth test launch	Success
The trial was carried in association with Strategic Forces Command (SFC) while the DRDO provided all logistic supports. The missile zeroed on the target with high accuracy reaching close to zero circular error probability. The missile travelled nearly 21 minutes and covered its full range of over 3,500 km.
7	24 January 2020 Visakhapatnam Coast	Underwater Pontoon; 50 m (160 ft)		Sixth test launch Depressed trajectory	Success
Last developmental trial of K-4 making the weapon ready for its series of production and induction in the armed forces. The missile was tested for a reduced range to validate new technologies incorporated in the system. The weapon was tested in its deliverable configuration with the active participation of Navy personnel.
8	27 November 2024 Visakhapatnam Coast	INS Arighaat		Seventh test launch	Success
First operational launch from INS Arighaat during submarine trials. Launch was successful. The missile trajectory and success of the missile test is being examined.The absence of a warhead on the missile was confirmed by the Chief of the Naval Staff.
9	23 December 2025 Visakhapatnam Coast	INS Arighaat		Eighth test launch	Success
DRDO reportedly conducted a successful K-4 missile test in the Bay of Bengal. Few more tests are scheduled for the final operational validation of sea-based nuclear triad. The test, which was supposedly scheduled for December 1-3, was postponed, due to the discovery of a Chinese Ocean Mineral Resources Vessel, 115 nautical miles off the southern edge of the navigation area on December 3. There was no formal announcement from the Defense Ministry about the test.

== Operators ==
India

INS Arihant; lead vessel of the Arihant-class submarines

- The Indian Navy is the only operator of K-4. As of September 2024, the deployment capacity stands at 8 missiles on Arihant-class ballistic missile submarines:
  - S2 Arihant
  - S3 Arighaat
  - S4 Aridhaman
  - S4* (Unknown designation)

== Reactions to testing ==
- Pakistan – The missile tests have drawn criticism from Zahir Kazmi, Arms Control Adviser at Pakistan's National Command Authority's Strategic Plans Division, who claims that they not only strengthen India's sea-based triad but also put the Indian Ocean region at risk of an arms race.

== See also ==
- K Missile family
- Arihant-class submarine
- Submarine-launched ballistic missile
