= K-5 (ballistic missile) =

Indian submarine-launched missile

- Type: SLBM
- Place of origin: India

Service history
- In service: Under development

Production history
- Designer: Defence Research and Development Organisation

Specifications
- Warhead: 2,000 kg (4,400 lb) nuclear war-head
- Engine: Solid-fuelled
- Operational range: 5,000–8,000 km (3,100–5,000 mi)
- Maximum speed: Mach 7.5 (9,190 km/h; 5,710 mph; 2.55 km/s)
- Launch platform: Arihant-class submarines, S5-class submarines

K-5 is a submarine-launched ballistic missile under development by the Defence Research and Development Organisation of India.

== Description ==
The K-5 is a submarine-launched ballistic missile. The missile consists of three separate stages and uses solid rocket propellant. It is planned to have a range of around 5,000–6,000 km (3,100–3,700 mi). The missile will be able to carry a payload weighing two tonnes. It is being developed to match the range of the Agni-V missile. It will be equipped on the Arihant-class submarines code named S4.

The K-5 will be equipped with countermeasures to avoid radar detection and will be the fastest missile in its class. It will also be equipped with MIRV.

== Development ==
The K-5 is being developed by the Defence Research and Development Organisation (DRDO). The development of the missile started in 2015. After completing the development of the K-4 (missile) in January 2020, the DRDO shifted its focus towards developing the K-5.

As of December 2018, preparations for the maiden test of the missile were underway. In October 2020, Hindustan Times reported that the missile is currently under development and was expected to be tested by 2022.

=== Static testing of the second stage motor ===
On 12 September 2025, the Advanced Centre for Energetic Materials (ACEM) in Nashik conducted a static firing test of the second-stage motor developed under Project K5. The motor is a 10-tonne-class solid-propellant design measuring approximately 2.68 metres in length and 2.4 metres in diameter. Its composite motor case uses T700 carbon-fibre reinforcement with Epofine resin, while the propellant grain employs a nine-fin finocyl configuration of HD 1.3 composite propellant. The motor incorporates a pyrogen ignition system and a submerged, thrust-vectoring nozzle actuated by two electromechanical actuators.

The test was intended to characterise the motor's ballistic performance and verify the operation and safety margins of its major subsystems. Instrumentation comprising more than 250 measurement channels was used to acquire test data. The nozzle was commanded through approximately ±2° of movement, with actuator operation beginning 10 seconds after ignition. The recorded pressure and thrust profiles were reported to be consistent with pre-test predictions, indicating the expected motor performance during the static firing.

The motor was manufactured using a newly established 50-tonne-capacity cast-cure installation at ACEM, which employs hopper-based continuous casting for large propellant grains. The successful processing and subsequent firing provided a demonstration of the facility's capability for larger-class solid motors and was also the first reported test of this motor type at ACEM's refurbished static-test facility.

== Testing ==
Date/Time (IST)	Launch Platform	Range (km)	Function	Outcome
Date/Time (IST)	Remarks			
30-31 MARCH 2026	Submerged test platform	N/A (480 km NOTAM)	Ejection test	Success
30-31 MARCH 2026	India had issued a NOTAM for a naval firing exercise in an area extending approximately 480 km off the coast of Visakhapatnam, scheduled from 30 March 2026, 6:30 AM IST to 31 March 2026, 5:00 PM IST. It reportedly involved a K-5 SLBM pop-up test (ejection test) in the Bay of Bengal. The test was reportedly intended to validate the missile's underwater ejection system and first-stage hardware.			

== See also ==
- K Missile family
