= Panchendriya (sonar) =

Indian Navy sonar suite

Panchendriya (Literally 5 senses in Sanskrit) is a sonar suite that has been developed by the Defence Research and Development Organisation, India for the submarines of the Indian Navy. It has been described as India's "first indigenously developed sonar system for submarines".

== History ==
The system has been developed by the Naval Physical Oceanographic Laboratory, Kochi a laboratory under the DRDO in the southern Indian state of Kerala. Initial approval for the project was given in 1987 for their induction into the Navy's Foxtrot-class submarines and was further approved as a measure to shore up indigenous production in sonar technology following a review in 1990. By 1994, development of engineering models and factory testing had been completed. Further tests on the system began in 1997 on board the INS Karanj with a scheduled induction for 2002.

== Features ==
The Panchendriya is a composite submarine sonar and tactical weapons control system that contains active, passive, surveillance, ranging and interception sonars. It also has a submarine communications system built into it.

== Deployment ==
Panchendriya has been inducted into the Kalvari-class, the Vela-class the Sindhughosh-class, and Kilo-class submarine as part of their upgrade. It is also part of the indigenously developed Arihant-class.

== See also ==
- USHUS (sonar)
