= S5-class submarine =

Planned class of Ballistic missile submarines

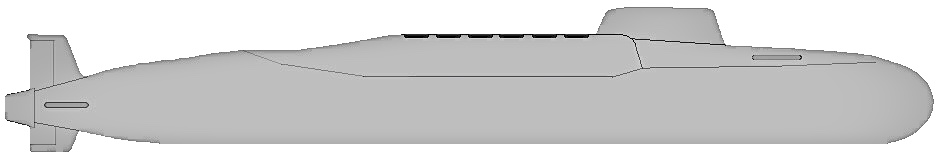
- An artistic impression of the S5-class submarine

Class overview
- Operators: Indian Navy
- Preceded by: Arihant class
- Planned: 4-6
- Building: 2

General characteristics
- Type: Nuclear powered ballistic missile submarine
- Displacement: 13,500 tonnes (13,300 long tons; 14,900 short tons)
- Propulsion: 1 x CLWR-B2 Compact Light-water reactor; 200 MW (270,000 hp); 1 × single shaft pump-jet propulsor
- Range: Unlimited
- Armament: 12 VLS cells for; K-5 SLBM (5,000–8,000 km or 3,100–5,000 mi range) (or); K6 MIRV SLBM (8,000–9,000 km or 5,000–5,600 mi range)

S5 is the code name for a planned class of Indian nuclear-powered ballistic missile submarines currently being developed for the Indian Navy. S5 will weigh around twice as much as the preceding Arihant-class submarine. It is reported that four boats of the class are expected to enter Indian service by the late 2030s.

== Design ==
The S5-class of submarines are planned to weigh around 13,500 tonnes (13,300 long tons; 14,900 short tons). The submarines are planned to be armed with up to twelve K6 Submarine-launched ballistic missiles, each armed with multiple independently targetable reentry vehicles.

== Development ==
In 2006, a high-level committee led by R. Chidambaram, the then principal scientific advisor to the Government of India, had assessed India's ability to construct three S5 series of SSBNs. The project with a budget of ₹10,000 crore (equivalent to ₹350 billion or US$3.6 billion in 2026) divided among DRDO, BARC and the ATV headquarters. The construction would tentatively begin in 2015 followed with the first submarine to be deployed in 2021. The Arihant-class submarine has limitations with its reactor and payload capacity.

Around 2012, with the S5 project remaining in developmental stage, another Arihant-class submarine was cleared for production to avoid idling of the production line. The new unit was designated as S4* (between S4 and S5). The boat would also feature the Arihant Stretch design.

As of December 2017, the final design work for the submarine was underway. The submarine would be equipped with 12 ballistic missiles.

As of 4 December 2022, the S5-class submarine was to enter production by 2027.

As of September 2024, the design phase of the submarine was nearing completion and project sanction was expected soon.

In September 2025, The Times of India reported that the Bhabha Atomic Research Centre (BARC) is developing a 200 MWe-rated nuclear reactor for the Indian Navy's next-generation nuclear submarines, including Project 77 and S5-class submarines.

By December 2025, the construction of the first two S5 SSBNs had commenced with four of the class of submarines expected to be commissioned by the late 2030s. In February 2026, it was reported that the overall tonnage of the S5-class submarines will be around 17,000-tons submerged.

== See also ==
- Arihant-class submarine
- Project 77-class submarine
- Submarine-building Perspective Plan
- Future of the Indian Navy
