= Submarine-launched ballistic missile =

Sub-orbital missile mostly carrying nuclear weapons

Trident II UGM-133A D5LE missile test fired from USS Wyoming in September 2021

A submarine-launched ballistic missile (SLBM) is a ballistic missile capable of being launched from submarines. SLBMs almost exclusively carry one or multiple nuclear warheads, and play an important role in nuclear strategy as a highly reliable and non-vulnerable second strike option. Nuclear-armed SLBMs are operated by China (JL-3), France (M51), India (Sagarika), Russia (Sineva, Lajner, and Bulava), the United Kingdom and the United States (both Trident II). South Korea is the only nation developing a conventionally-armed SLBM, the Hyunmoo 4-4.

SLBMs typically have similar ranges and designs to intercontinental ballistic missiles (ICBMs), which range over 5,500 kilometres (3,000 nmi). Modern variants favor solid propellant and usually deliver multiple independently targetable reentry vehicles (MIRVs), each of which carries a strategic nuclear warhead and allows a single launched missile to strike several targets. SLBMs typically use a combination of inertial and celestial navigation systems. Some SLBMs have also been used in a tactical nuclear weapon role, such as the United States W76 Mod 2 warhead mated to the UGM-133 Trident II missile.

The Soviet Union tested the world's first SLBM, the R-11FM, in 1955, and became the first country to operate ballistic missile submarines with the R-11FM in 1956. The United States Navy first developed the UGM-27 Polaris, operational from 1961. The Polaris A-3 was the first missile to use multiple re-entry vehicles, a nuclear cluster munition. The US Navy remains the largest operators of SLBMs, with 280 Trident II missiles, followed by the Russian Navy with 192 total SLBMs.

== History ==
=== Origins ===
The first practical design of a submarine-based launch platform was developed by the Germans near the end of World War II involving a launch tube which contained a V-2 ballistic missile variant and was towed behind a submarine, known by the code-name Prüfstand XII. The war ended before it could be tested, but the engineers who had worked on it were taken to work for the United States (Operation Paperclip) and for the Soviet Union on their SLBM programs. These and other early SLBM systems required vessels to be surfaced when they fired missiles, but launch systems were adapted to allow underwater launching in the 1950–1960s. A converted Project 611 (Zulu-IV class) submarine launched the world's first SLBM, an R-11FM (SS-N-1 Scud-A, naval variant of the SS-1 Scud) on 16 September 1955. Five additional Project V611 and AV611 (Zulu-V class) submarines became the world's first operational ballistic missile submarines (SSBs) with two R-11FM missiles each, entering service in 1956–57.

The United States Navy initially worked on a sea-based variant of the US Army Jupiter intermediate-range ballistic missile, projecting four of the large, liquid-fueled missiles per submarine. Rear Admiral W. F. "Red" Raborn headed a Special Project Office to develop Jupiter for the Navy, beginning in late 1955. However, at the Project Nobska submarine warfare conference in 1956, physicist Edward Teller stated that a physically small one-megaton warhead could be produced for the relatively small, solid-fueled Polaris missile, and this prompted the Navy to leave the Jupiter program in December of that year. Soon Chief of Naval Operations Admiral Arleigh Burke concentrated all Navy strategic research on Polaris, still under Admiral Raborn's Special Project Office. All US SLBMs have been solid-fueled while all Soviet and Russian SLBMs have been liquid-fueled except for the Russian RSM-56 Bulava, which entered service in 2014.

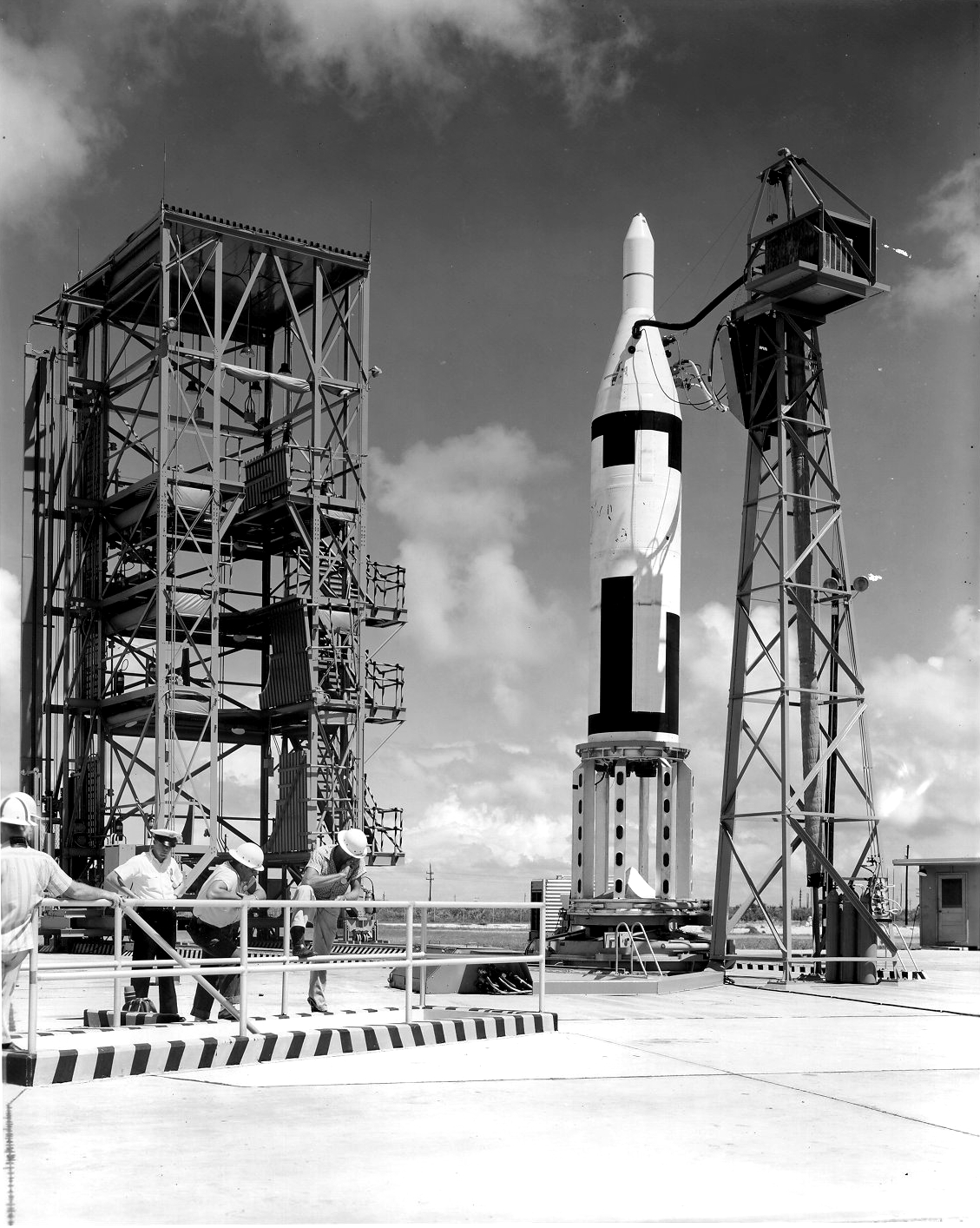
Polaris A-1 on launch pad LC-25A in Cape Canaveral

The world's first operational nuclear-powered ballistic missile submarine (SSBN) was USS George Washington with 16 Polaris A-1 missiles, which entered service in December 1959 and conducted the first SSBN deterrent patrol November 1960 – January 1961. George Washington also conducted the first successful submerged SLBM launch with a Polaris A-1 on 20 July 1960. Fifty-two days later, the Soviet Union made its first successful underwater launch of a submarine ballistic missile in the White Sea, on 10 September 1960 from the same converted Project 611 (NATO reporting name Zulu-IV class) submarine that first launched the R-11FM. The Soviets were only a year behind the US with their first SSBN, the ill-fated K-19 of Project 658 (Hotel class), commissioned in November 1960. However, the Hotel class carried only three R-13 missiles (NATO reporting name SS-N-4) each and had to surface and raise the missile to launch. Submerged launch was not an operational capability for the Soviets until 1963, when the R-21 missile (SS-N-5) was first backfitted to Project 658 (Hotel class) and Project 629 (Golf class) submarines. The Soviet Union was able to beat the US in launching and testing the first SLBM with a live nuclear warhead, an R-13 that detonated in the Novaya Zemlya Test Range in the Arctic Ocean, doing so on 20 October 1961, just ten days before the gigantic 50 Mt Tsar Bomba's detonation in the same general area. The United States eventually conducted a similar test in the Pacific Ocean on 6 May 1962, with a Polaris A-2 launched from USS Ethan Allen as part of the nuclear test series Operation Dominic. The first Soviet SSBN with 16 missiles was the Project 667A (Yankee class), which first entered service in 1967 with 32 boats completed by 1974. By the time the first Yankee was commissioned the US had built 41 SSBNs, nicknamed the "41 for Freedom".

French M45 SLBM and M51 SLBM in cross-section of a submarine.

=== Deployment and further development ===
The short range of the early SLBMs dictated basing and deployment locations. By the late 1960s the Polaris A-3 was deployed on all US SSBNs with a range of 4,600 kilometres (2,500 nmi), a great improvement on the 1,900-kilometre (1,000 nmi) range of Polaris A-1. The A-3 also had three warheads that landed in a pattern around a single target. The Yankee class was initially equipped with the R-27 Zyb missile (SS-N-6) with a range of 2,400 kilometres (1,300 nmi). The US was much more fortunate in its basing arrangements than the Soviets. Thanks to NATO and the US possession of Guam, US SSBNs were permanently forward deployed at Advanced Refit Sites in Holy Loch, Scotland, Rota, Spain, and Guam by the middle 1960s, resulting in short transit times to patrol areas near the Soviet Union. The SSBN facilities at the Advanced Refit Sites were austere, with only a submarine tender and floating dry dock. Converted merchant ships designated T-AKs (Military Sealift Command cargo ships) were provided to ferry missiles and supplies to the sites. With two rotating crews per boat, about one-third of the total US force could be in a patrol area at any time. The Soviet bases, in Severomorsk (near Murmansk) for the Arctic-Atlantic theater in Petropavlovsk-Kamchatsky for the Pacific theater, required their SSBNs to make a long transit (e.g., through NATO-monitored waters in the Atlantic) to their mid-ocean patrol areas to hold the continental United States (CONUS) at risk. This resulted in only a small percentage of the Soviet force occupying patrol areas at any time, and was a great motivation for longer-range Soviet SLBMs, which would allow them to patrol close to their bases, in areas sometimes referred to as "deep bastions". These missiles were the R-29 Vysota series (SS-N-8, SS-N-18, SS-N-23), equipped on Projects 667B, 667BD, 667BDR, and 667BDRM (Delta-I through Delta-IV classes). The SS-N-8, with a range of 7,700 kilometres (4,200 nmi), entered service on the first Delta-I boat in 1972, before the Yankee class was even completed. A total of 43 Delta-class boats of all types entered service 1972–90, with the SS-N-18 on the Delta III class and the R-29RM Shtil (SS-N-23) on the Delta IV class. The new missiles had increased range and eventually multiple independently targetable reentry vehicles (MIRV), multiple warheads that could each hit a different target.

=== Poseidon and Trident I ===
Although the US did not commission any new SSBNs from 1967 through 1981, it did introduce two new SLBMs. Thirty-one of the forty-one original US SSBNs were built with larger diameter launch tubes with future missiles in mind. In the early 1970s the Poseidon (C-3) missile entered service, and those 31 SSBNs were backfitted with it. Poseidon offered a massive MIRV capability of up to 14 warheads per missile. Like the Soviets, the US also desired a longer-range missile that would allow SSBNs to be based in CONUS. In the late 1970s the Trident I (C-4) missile with a range of 7,400 kilometres (4,000 nmi) and eight MIRV warheads was backfitted to 12 of the Poseidon-equipped submarines. The SSBN facilities (primarily a submarine tender and floating dry dock) of the base at Rota, Spain were disestablished and the Naval Submarine Base Kings Bay in Georgia was built for the Trident I-equipped force.

=== Trident and Typhoon submarines ===
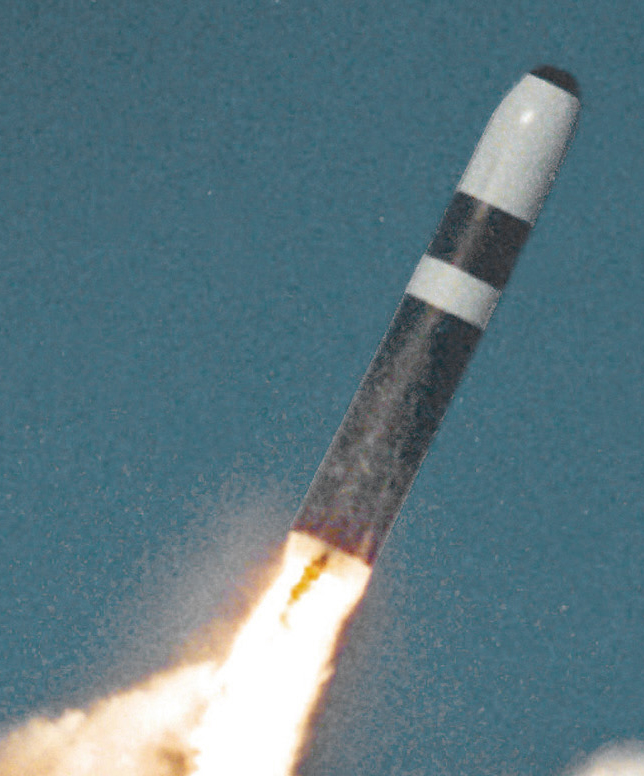
A Trident II missile just after launch.

Both the United States and the Soviet Union commissioned larger SSBNs designed for new missiles in 1981. The American large SSBN was the Ohio class, also called the "Trident submarine", with the largest SSBN armament ever of 24 missiles, initially Trident I but built with much larger tubes for the Trident II (D-5) missile, which entered service in 1990. The entire class was converted to use Trident II by the early 2000s. Trident II offered a range of over 8,000 kilometres (4,300 nmi) with eight larger MIRV warheads than Trident I. When USS Ohio commenced sea trials in 1980, two of the first ten US SSBNs had their missiles removed to comply with SALT treaty requirements; the remaining eight were converted to attack submarines (SSN) by the end of 1982. These were all in the Pacific, and the Guam SSBN base was disestablished; the first several Ohio-class boats used new Trident facilities at Naval Submarine Base Bangor, Washington. Eighteen Ohio-class boats were commissioned by 1997, four of which were converted as cruise missile submarines (SSGN) in the 2000s to comply with START I treaty requirements. The largest Soviet SSBN was the Project 941 Akula, known in the west as the Typhoon-class (and not to be confused with the Project 971 Shchuka attack submarine, called "Akula" by NATO). The Typhoons were the largest submarines ever built at 48,000 tons submerged. They were armed with 20 of the R-39 Rif (SS-N-20) missiles with a range of 8,300 kilometres (4,500 nmi) and 10 MIRV warheads. Six Typhoons were commissioned between 1981–89.

=== Post-Cold War ===
Test launch of the K-4 in March 2014.

New SSBN construction terminated for over 10 years in Russia and slowed in the US with the collapse of the Soviet Union and the end of the Cold War in 1991. The US rapidly decommissioned its remaining 31 older SSBNs, with a few converted to other roles, and the base at Holy Loch was disestablished. Most of the former Soviet SSBN force was gradually scrapped under the provisions of the Nunn–Lugar Cooperative Threat Reduction agreement through 2012. By that time the Russian SSBN force stood at six Delta-IVs, three Delta-IIIs, and a lone Typhoon used as a testbed for new missiles (the R-39s unique to the Typhoons were reportedly scrapped in 2012). Upgraded missiles such as the R-29RMU Sineva (SS-N-23 Sineva) were developed for the Deltas. In 2013 the Russians commissioned the first Borei-class submarine, also called the Dolgorukiy class after the lead vessel. By 2015 two others had entered service. This class is intended to replace the aging Deltas, and carries 16 solid-fuel RSM-56 Bulava missiles, with a reported range of 10,000 kilometres (5,400 nmi) and six MIRV warheads. In 2020 the US Navy laid down the first Columbia-class submarine, USS District of Columbia at General Dynamics Electric Boat. The class is expected to serve until the 2080s.

Ballistic missile submarines have been of great strategic importance for the United States, Russia, and other nuclear powers since they entered service in the Cold War, as they can hide from reconnaissance satellites and fire their nuclear weapons with virtual impunity. This makes them immune to a first strike directed against nuclear forces, allowing each side to maintain the capability to launch a devastating retaliatory strike, even if all land-based missiles have been destroyed. This relieves each side of the necessity to adopt a launch on warning posture, with its attendant risk of accidental nuclear war. Additionally, the deployment of highly accurate missiles on ultra-quiet submarines allows an attacker to sneak up close to the enemy coast and launch a missile on a depressed trajectory (a non-optimal ballistic trajectory which trades off reduced throw-weight for a faster and lower path, effectively reducing the time between launch and impact), thus opening the possibility of a decapitation strike.

Indian SLBM's started with the Deployment of the nation's first Arihant-class submarine into service, equipped with the K-15 missiles giving a range of 750 km. A series of SLBM's are developed as part of the K Missile family of missiles to complete the nuclear triad capability providing credible nuclear Deterrence. Later on the submarine was equipped with the 3500 km ranged k-4 missiles. Further two missiles type of SLBM's K-5 and K-6 are developed for S5 class of submarines.

== Non-military use ==
Some former Russian SLBMs have been converted into Volna and Shtil' launch vehicles to launch satellites – either from a submarine or from a launch site on land.

== Gallery ==
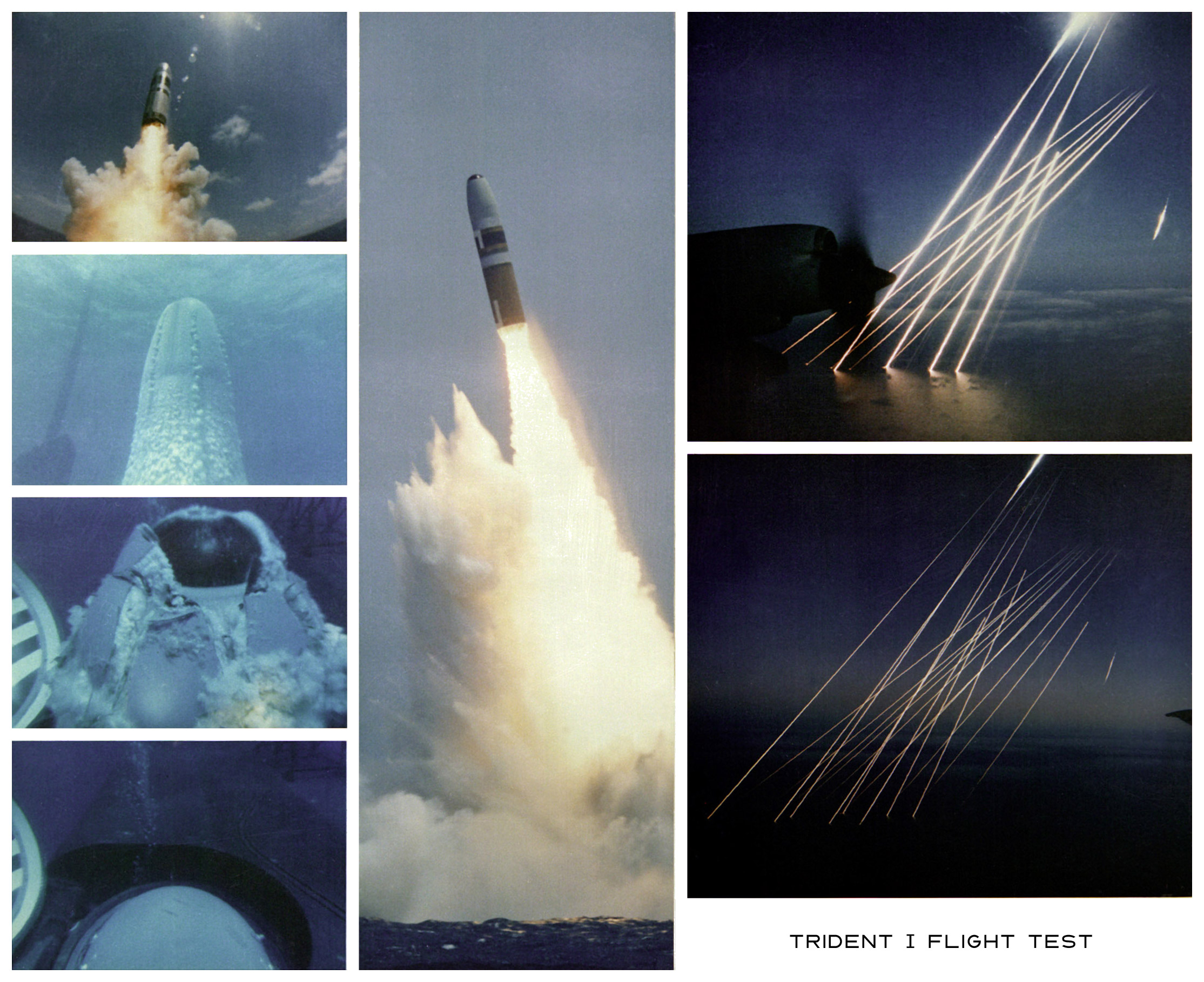
Montage of the launch of a Trident I C-4 SLBM and the paths of its reentry vehicles

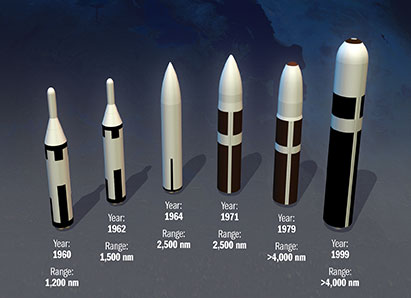
Selected US SLBMs. L to R: Polaris A1, Polaris A2, Polaris A3, Poseidon, Trident I and Trident II

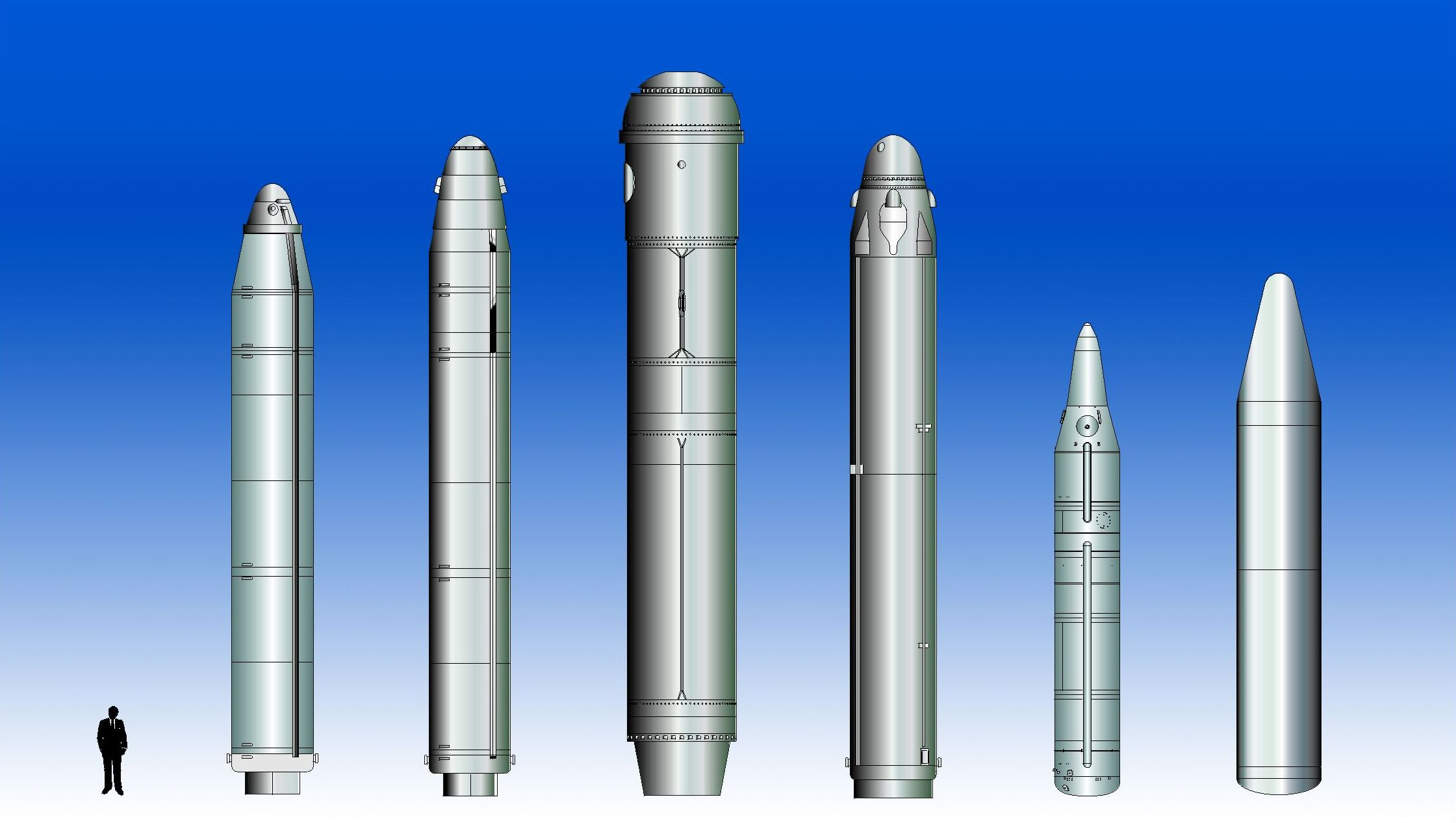
Selected Russian and Chinese SLBMs. L to R: R-29 Vysota (SS-N-8), R-29R (SS-N-18), R-39 (SS-N-20), R-29RM (SS-N-23), JL-1, JL-2

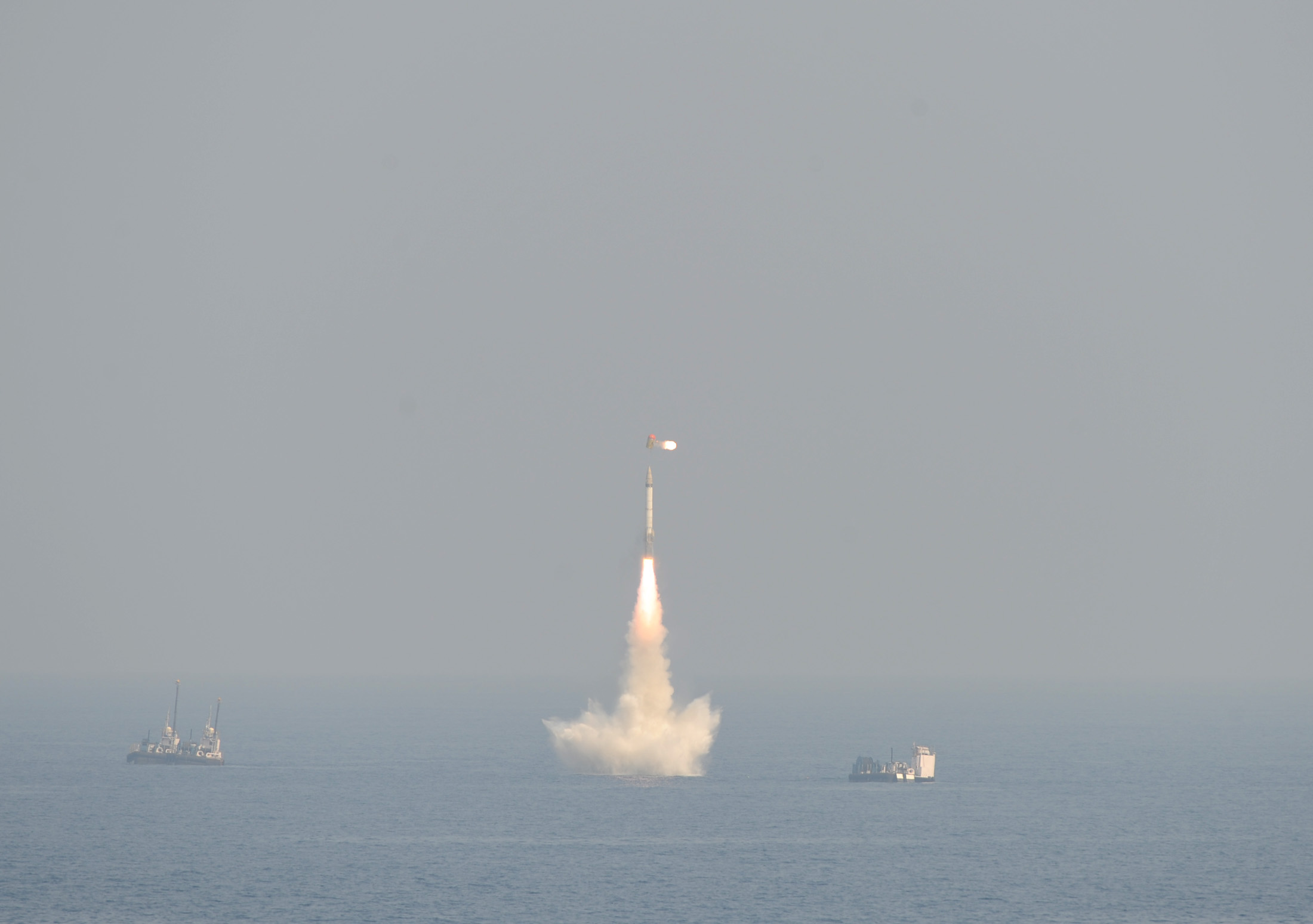
K-15 Sagarika SLBM

== See also ==
- Submarine-launched missile
- Ballistic missile submarine
- ICBM
- Comparison of ICBMs
- List of ICBMs
- Heavy ICBM
- Nuclear warfare
- Vertical launching system
- Intermediate-range ballistic missile
- Submarine-launched cruise missile
- Mutually assured destruction
