= Agni-V =

Indian road-mobile ICBM

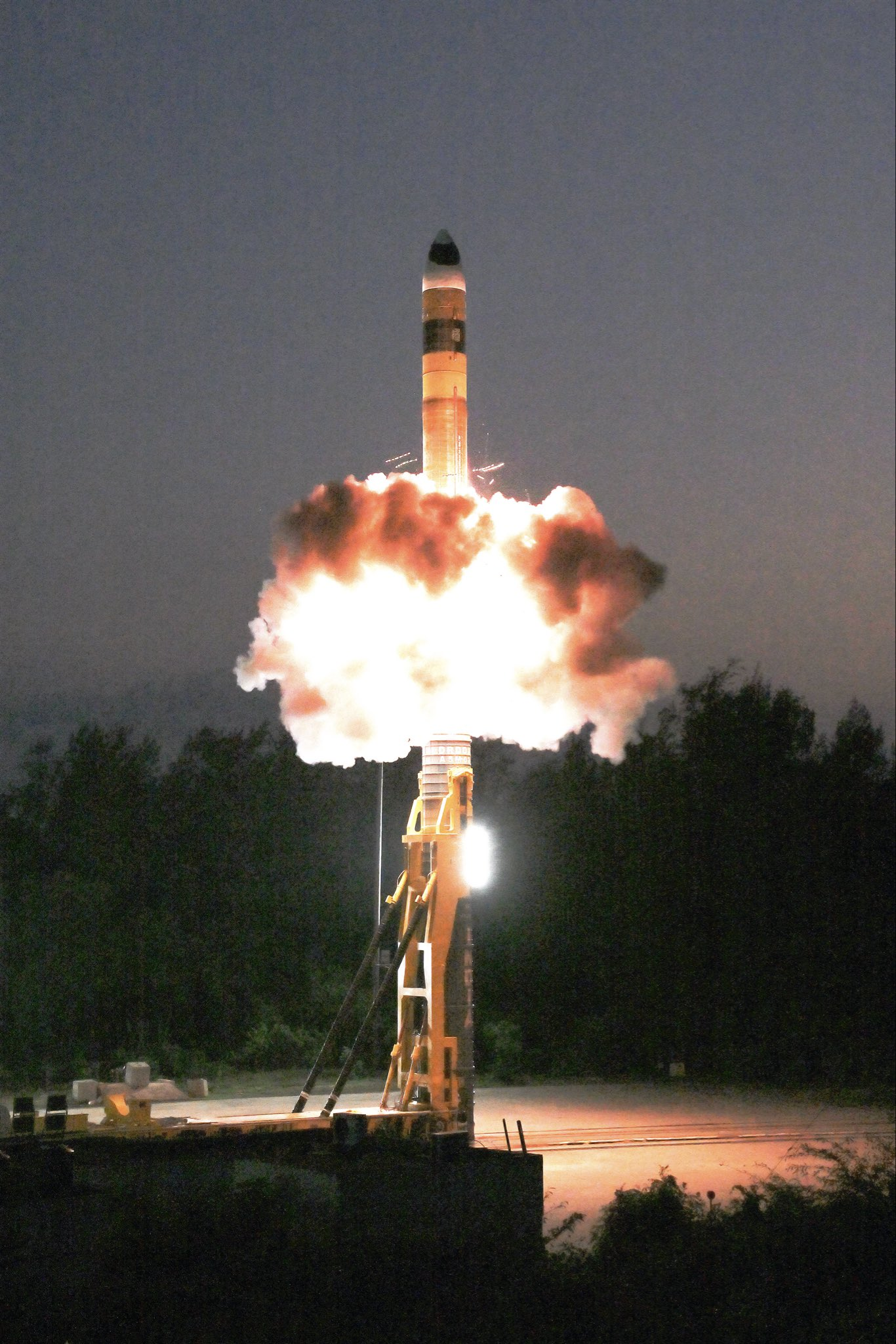
- Advanced Agni-V missile (MIRV variant) test flight
- Type: Intermediate-range ballistic missile Reported Intercontinental ballistic missile capability
- Place of origin: India

Service history
- In service: Active
- Used by: Strategic Forces Command

Production history
- Designer: Defence Research and Development Organisation
- Manufacturer: Bharat Dynamics Limited
- Unit cost: ₹50 crore (US$5 million)

Specifications
- Mass: 50000–56000 kg
- Length: 17.5 m
- Diameter: 2 metres (6 ft 7 in)
- Warhead: 3-6 (tested); 10-12 warheads Nuclear MIRVs
- Warhead weight: 3,000–4,000 kilograms (6,600–8,800 lb); 7,500–8,000 kilograms (16,500–17,600 lb) (air-burst or bunker buster)
- Engine: Three-stage solid rocket
- Propellant: Solid fuel
- Operational range: 7,000–8,000 kilometres (4,300–5,000 mi); 2,500–3,000 kilometres (1,600–1,900 mi) (air-burst or bunker buster variant)
- Maximum speed: Terminal phase: Mach 24 (29,400 km/h; 18,300 mph; 8.17 km/s)
- Guidance system: RLG-INS + multi-GNSS + redundant micro-inertial navigation
- Launch platform: 8 × 8 Tatra TEL; Rail Mobile Launcher (Canisterised Missile Package)
- Transport: Road

Agni-V (Sanskrit: अग्नि; lit. Fire) is a land based nuclear MIRV-capable intermediate-range ballistic missile (IRBM) developed by the Defence Research and Development Organisation (DRDO) of India. Although the missile is officially classified as an "IRBM" with a range in excess of 5,500 kilometres (3,400 mi), experts estimate it to be an intercontinental ballistic missile (ICBM) with a range of 8,000 km (5,000 mi). It is a three-stage, road-mobile, canisterised and solid-fueled ballistic missile. The missile reaches a speed of Mach 24 (29,400 km/h; 8.17 km/s) during its flight.

== Development ==
Night launch of the missile

Agni-V was primarily intended for enhancing the Indian nuclear deterrence against China. Until the development of the Agni-V, the longest range missile India had was Agni-IV with a range of 4,000 km. If launched from central India this range was not sufficient to reach targets on the extreme eastern and north-eastern region of China. Most of the major economic centers of China lay on its eastern seaboard.

Senior defense scientist M. Natarajan disclosed in 2007 that DRDO was working on an upgraded version of the Agni-III, known as the Agni-V, and that it would be ready in 4 years. The missile was to have a range of more than 5,000 kilometres (3,100 mi).

It was estimated that the missile would be operational by 2014 to 2015 after four to five repeatable tests. Indian authorities believed that the solid-fueled Agni-V was more than adequate to meet current threat perceptions and security concerns. Even with a range of only 5,000 km, the Agni-V could hit any target in China, including Beijing.

The missile was designed to be easy to transport by road through the utilization of a canister-launch missile system, which is distinct from those of the earlier Agni missiles. Agni-V would also carry multiple independently targetable reentry vehicle payloads.

With a launch mass of around 50 tonnes (49 long tons; 55 short tons) and a development cost of over $292 million, Agni-V incorporated technologies involving ring laser gyroscope and accelerometer for navigation and guidance. It took its first stage from Agni-III, with a modified second stage and a miniaturized third stage enabling it to fly distance of 5,000 kilometres (3,100 mi). The second and third stage are completely made of composite material to reduce weight. With a canister-launch system to impart higher road mobility, allowing for greater operational flexibility than the earlier generation of Agni missiles. According to the Agni-V Project Director, Tessy Thomas, the accuracy of Agni-V are far greater than their predecessors.

=== Conventional weapon variants ===
DRDO started working on two modified variants of Agni-V in 2025 that could carry up to 7,500–8,000 kilograms (16,500–17,600 lb) of air-burst or bunker buster munitions. It is anticipated that the bunker buster type will penetrate 80–100 metres (260–330 ft) deep before detonating, and it is intended to attack hardened facilities buried beneath layers of reinforced concrete. The air-burst type will be used against runways, air bases, and armored formations. Both variants are being designed to target vital military installations, missile silos, and command and control centers in China and Pakistan. The anticipated speed for the modified variants is Mach 8 – Mach 20 (9,800–24,500 km/h), with a range of 2,500–3,000 kilometres (1,600–1,900 mi). In the absence of stealth bombers, DRDO decided to use missile as the delivery system for operational flexibility and reduced delivery costs. The aim is to provide conventional means to neutralize targets in preemptive strike.

Following Operation Sindoor, which revealed gaps in the Indian Air Force's capacity to eliminate heavily fortified underground targets, the drive for a bunker buster accelerated. The long-planned missile modifications got new impetus following the 2025 United States strikes on Iranian nuclear sites. Given that China and Pakistan have well defended underground installations along their borders and that traditional airstrikes are less effective in hilly and high-altitude regions, these new missile types become strategically important for the Indian Armed Forces.

=== Deployment ===
According to media reports that cite official sources, the missile was being deployed by Strategic Forces Command as of July 2018. While the flight trials of the MIRV version of the missile is underway as of 2026, the base variant with a single warhead has already been deployed with the Strategic Forces Command which conducts regular training trials of the missile.

== Description ==
=== Propulsion ===
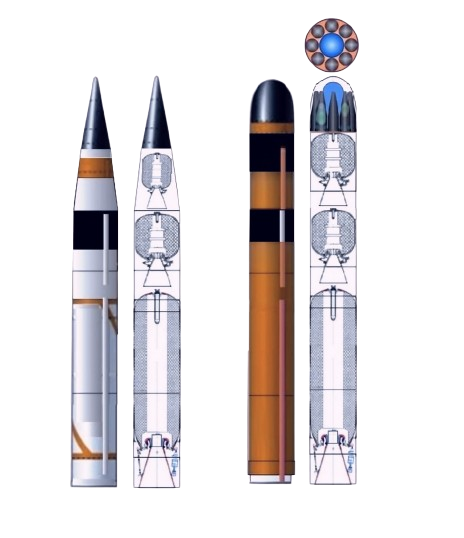
Cutaway diagram of Single-RV and MIRV variants of the missile

The Agni-V is a three-stage solid fuelled intermediate-range ballistic missile with composite motor casing in the second and third stage. The missile is a development of the Agni III with an additional third stage while incorporating indigenous composite rocket motors which resulted in weights reduced by 20% and an increased range over the older designs.

Total flight duration for the first flight test of Agni-V on 20 April 2012 was for 1130 seconds. The first stage ignited for 90 seconds.

=== Range ===
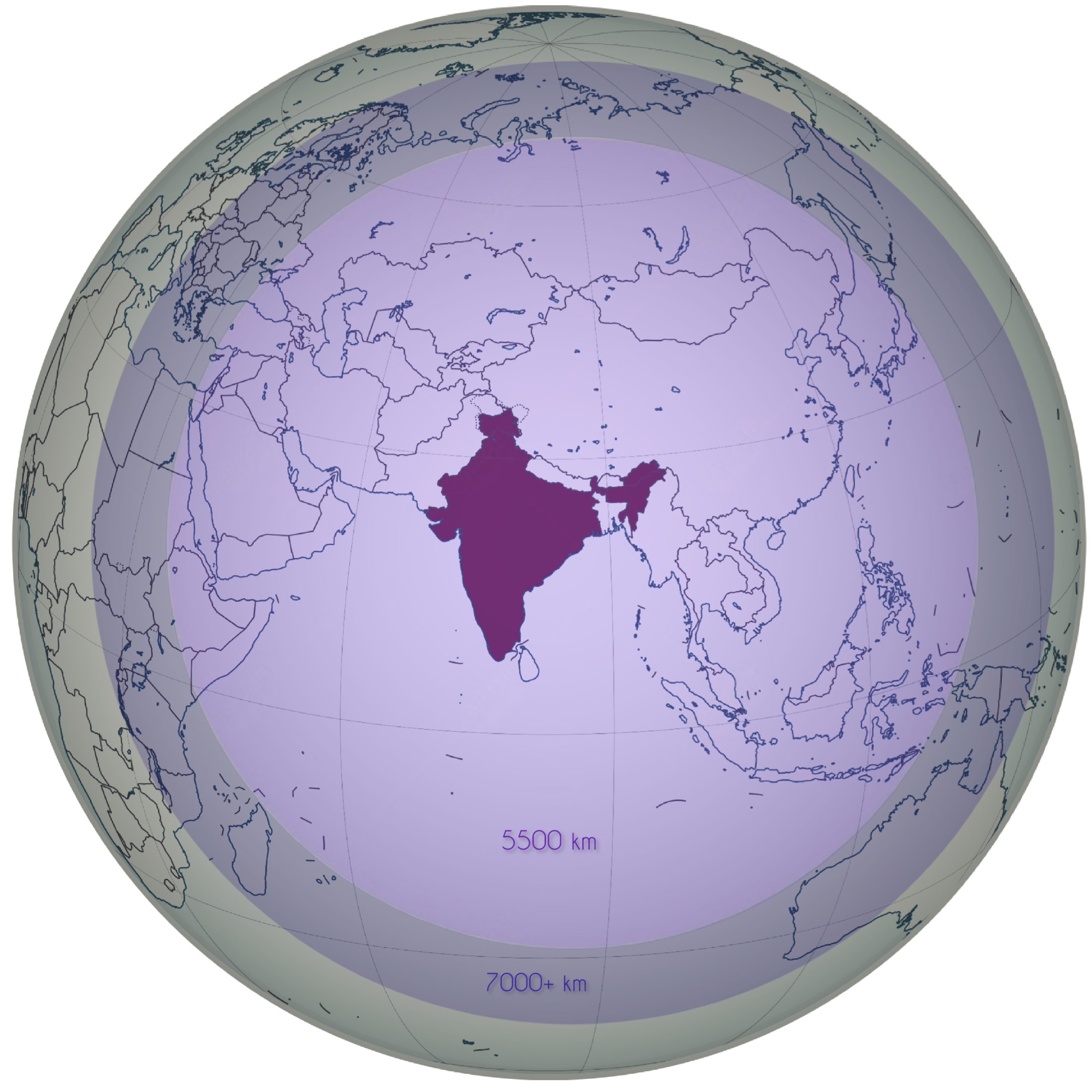
Strike range envelope of Agni-V centered at Wheeler ITR

The DRDO chief V. K. Saraswat initially declined to disclose the exact range of Agni-V. Later, however, he described Agni V as a missile with a range of 5,500–5,800 km. Du Wenlong, a researcher at China's PLA Academy of Military Sciences, told the Chinese news agency, Global Times, that the missile has a range of around 8,000 kilometres (5,000 mi). Wenlong also said that the Indian government had deliberately downplayed the missile's capability in order to avoid causing concern to other countries. The exact range of the Agni-V missile is classified. Business Standard reported that the range of Agni-V can be increased if needed. On 15 December 2022, the first night trial of Agni-V was successfully carried out by the SFC, after which media reports stated that the missile is now 20 percent lighter due to the use of composite materials that can increase the range beyond 7,000 km if required.

=== Guidance and control ===
A ring laser gyroscope based inertial navigation system (RLG-INS) is primarily responsible for guiding the Agni-V to its target. However, Agni-V is equipped with another guidance system called micro inertial navigation system (MINGS) as a backup. These are capable of interacting with Indian and foreign satellite navigation systems like NavIC and GPS. Both of these systems have been developed by the Research Centre Imarat. Agni-V uses a system on chip based on-board computer distributed architecture whose weight is around 200 grams for control and guidance. All stages of the missile have nozzle-based control systems. While keeping the inside temperature below 50°C, the atmospheric re-entry barrier can tolerate temperatures of over 4,000°C.

=== Mobility ===
"The Agni-V is specially tailored for road-mobility," explained Avinash Chander, the Director of ASL. "With the canister having been successfully developed, all India's future land-based strategic missiles will be canisterised as well." Made of maraging steel, a canister must provide a hermetically sealed atmosphere that preserves the missile for years. During firing, the canister must absorb enormous stresses when a thrust of 300 to 400 tonnes-force (2,900 to 3,900 kN) is generated to eject the 50 tonnes (110,000 lb) missile.

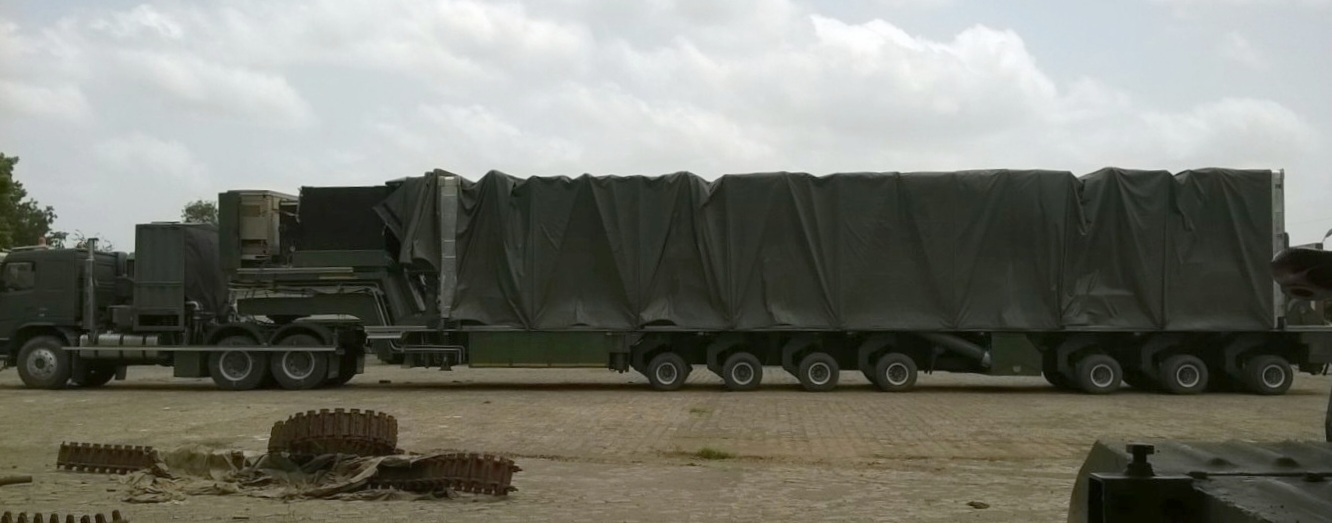
TCT-5 missile launch vehicle for Agni-V

If the missile is ejected using a gas generator from the canister, then the missile could be launched from any pre-surveyed launch location without the need for any pre-built launch site.

The launcher, which is known as the Transport-cum-Tilting vehicle-5, is a 140-ton, 30-metre, 7-axle trailer pulled by a 3-axle Volvo truck according to the DRDO Newsletter. The canister design will reduce the reaction time drastically...just a few minutes from 'stop-to-launch’. It has an electronic controller for all auto and remote operations, a 23 kVA generator, and a PTO driven hydraulic power pack and therefore can carry out launch operations without any external power source and logistics.

=== Anti-satellite version ===
V. K. Saraswat said that an ASAT version is technically possible: ASAT weapon would require reaching about 800 km altitude. Agni-V offers the boosting capability and the 'kill vehicle', with advanced seekers, will be able to home into the target satellite.

=== MIRV ===
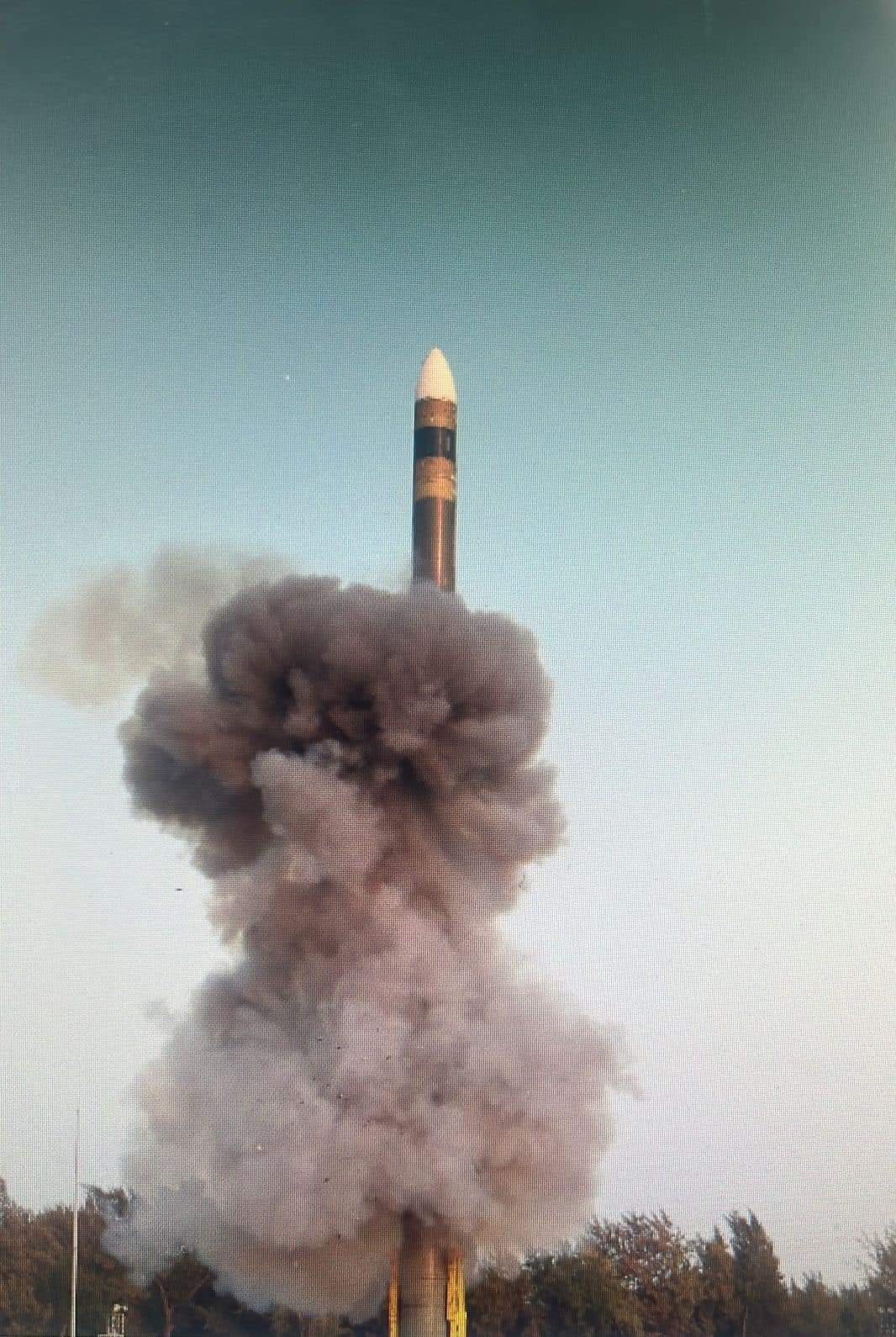
MIRV armed variant of the missile ejecting from canister

Agni-V has MIRV capability, with each missile being capable of carrying around 10-12 separate maneuverable nuclear warheads. Each warhead can be assigned to a different target, separated by hundreds of kilometers; alternatively, two or more warheads can be assigned to one target. According to DRDO sources, a MIRV payload would be significantly heavier since it would consist of several nuclear warheads, each of them weighting about 400 kilograms. A 5-warhead MIRV configuration, therefore, would weigh two to four tonnes.

As of 2012, the primary module for MIRV was in an advanced stage of development. It will be deployed when deemed necessary, according to officials. The MIRV capability of Agni-V has been tested indirectly in a discreet manner, according to Bharat Karnad, who was involved in drafting India's nuclear doctrine. Karnad states that the MIRV capability of the missile's guidance system on chip (SOC) was tested during the multi-satellite PSLV-C20 launch on 25 February 2013. The Agni-VI was the first missile expected to be equipped with MIRV capability. However, the government has no sought proposals from DRDO on the project as of 2026. On 11 March 2024, Prime Minister Narendra Modi celebrated the successful completion of Mission Divyastra, the country's maiden flight test of the Agni-V missile using MIRV technology, which was developed in-house.

In addition to the live warhead, Agni-V can also use decoys to avoid detection. Carbon composites are used in the manufacturing process to ensure that the warhead can survive high temperatures and not disintegrate during the re-entry phase.

== Testing ==
=== Preparation for testing ===
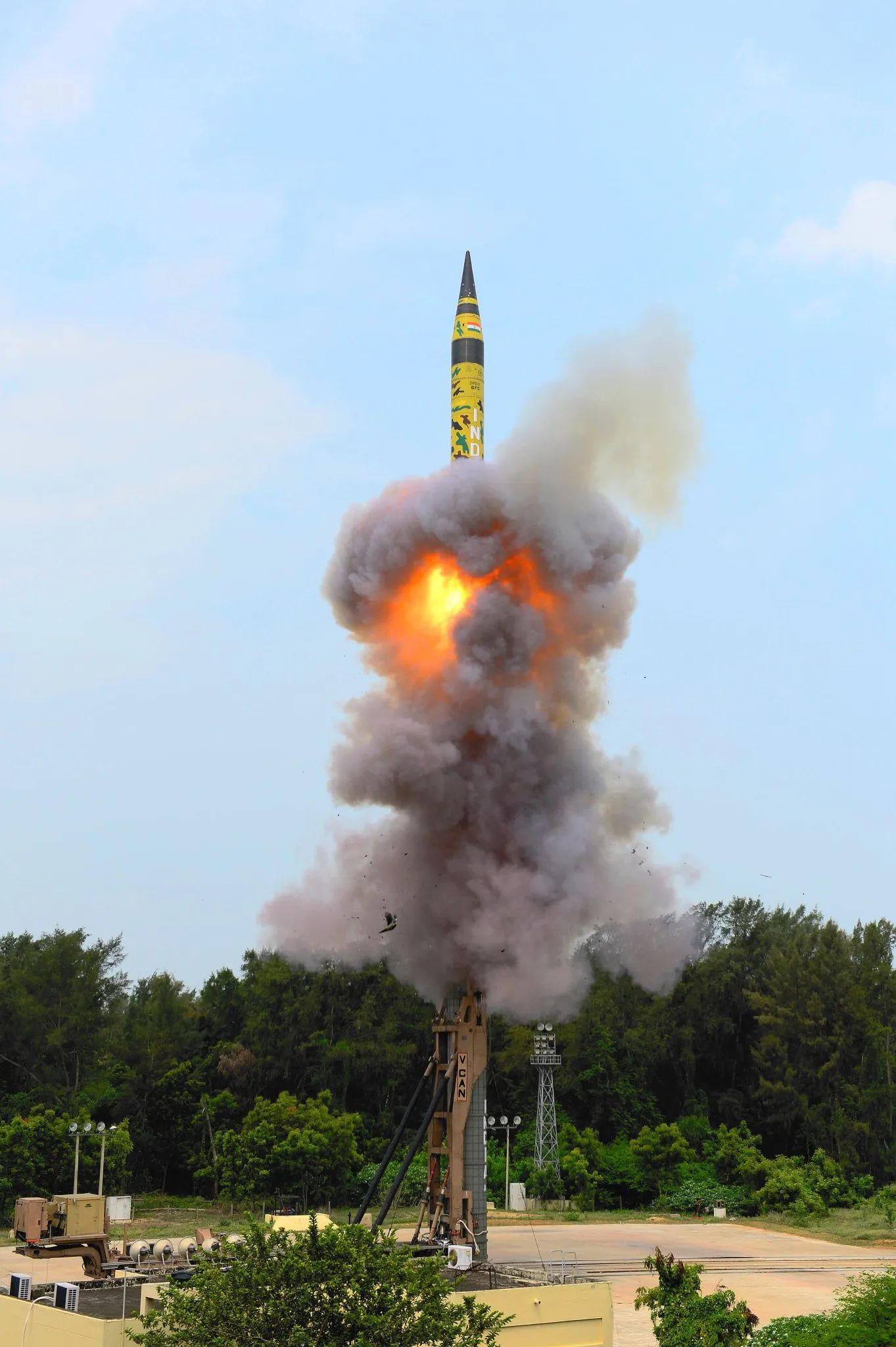
Camouflage paint scheme in June 2018 launch

The then Indian defense minister A. K. Antony, addressing the annual DRDO awards ceremony, asked defense scientists to demonstrate the missile's capability at the earliest opportunity. DRDO chief V. K. Saraswat told Times of India in mid-2011 that DRDO had tested the three solid-propellant composite rocket motor stages of Agni-V independently and all ground tests had been completed. In September 2011, Saraswat confirmed that the first test flight would be conducted in 2012 from Abdul Kalam Island.

In February 2012, a source revealed that DRDO was almost ready for the test, but there were scheduling and logistical issues since the missile was to traverse halfway across the Indian Ocean. Countries like Indonesia and Australia as well as international air and maritime traffic in the test zone had to be alerted 7–10 days before the test. Moreover, Indian Navy warships, with DRDO scientists and tracking and monitoring systems, were to be positioned midway and near the impact point in the southern Indian Ocean.

=== Agni-V Launch Log ===
Date/Time (IST)	Configuration	Launch Site	Duration	Outcome
Date/Time (IST)	Operator	Launch Site	Duration	Outcome
Date/Time (IST)	Operator	Payload	Range	Function
Date/Time (IST)	Remarks			
19 APR 2012; 8:05 AM	Open Rail Mobile Launcher	ITR Launch Complex 4	20 min	Success
19 APR 2012; 8:05 AM	DRDO	Single mass simulator	5000+ km	First test launch
19 APR 2012; 8:05 AM	The third stage fired the re-entry vehicle into the atmosphere at an altitude of 100 kilometres which subsequently impacted the pre-designated target point in the Indian Ocean with pin-point accuracy of few meters. The director of the test range, S.P. Das, informed BBC that all test parameters were met.			
15 SEP 2013; 8:48 AM	Open Rail Mobile Launcher	ITR Launch Complex 4	20+ min	Success
15 SEP 2013; 8:48 AM	DRDO	Single mass simulator	—N/a	Second test launch
15 SEP 2013; 8:48 AM	Scientists on the programme have spent the last 16 months studying the telemetry and performance data of the first test and fine-tuning all systems, including the navigation system and on board systems. During the second test, the missile hit the pre-designed target in the Indian Ocean with an accuracy of a few metre.			
31 JAN 2015; 8:10 AM	Canistered TATRA TEL	ITR Launch Complex 4	20 min	Success
31 JAN 2015; 8:10 AM	DRDO	Single mass simulator	5000+ km	Third test launch
31 JAN 2015; 8:10 AM	The Integrated Test Range Director, M. V. K. V. Prasad, said: "The missile, witnessed a flawless 'auto launch' and detailed results will be known after all data is retrieved from different radars and network systems."			
26 DEC 2016; 11:05 AM	Canistered TATRA TEL	ITR Launch Complex 4	19 min	Success
26 DEC 2016; 11:05 AM	DRDO	Single mass simulator	<2500 km	Fourth test launch
26 DEC 2016; 11:05 AM	Commanded by the on-board computer with a support of highly accurate ring laser gyro based inertial navigation system, the most modern micro inertial navigation system (MINS), fully digital control system and advanced compact avionics, the missile hit the target point accurately, meeting all objectives.			
18 JAN 2018; 09:53 AM	Canistered TATRA TEL	ITR Launch Complex 4	19 min	Success
18 JAN 2018; 09:53 AM	DRDO	Single mass simulator	4900 km	Fifth test launch
18 JAN 2018; 09:53 AM	The flight performance of the missile was tracked and monitored by radars, range stations and tracking systems throughout the flight. All objectives of the mission were met successfully.			
03 JUN 2018; 09:45 AM	Canistered Rail Mobile Launcher	ITR Launch Complex 4	—N/a	Success
03 JUN 2018; 09:45 AM	DRDO	Single mass simulator	—N/a	Sixth test launch
03 JUN 2018; 09:45 AM	All the Radars, Electro Optical Tracking Stations and Telemetry Stations tracked the vehicle all through the course of the trajectory and was a "precision launch". All the mission objectives have been achieved.			
10 DEC 2018; 01:30 PM	Canistered Rail Mobile Launcher	ITR Launch Complex 4	—N/a	Success
10 DEC 2018; 01:30 PM	DRDO	Single mass simulator	2041 km	Seventh test launch
10 DEC 2018; 01:30 PM	This was for the first time that the missile was test-fired in a lofted trajectory. The missile blasted off from a hermetically sealed canister. This lofted trajectory flight was used to determine whether it followed the perfect flight path with close to zero error. This trial completed the Agni-V pre-induction trials.			
User Trial Launches
27 OCT 2021; 7:50 PM	—N/a	ITR Launch Complex 4	—N/a	Success
27 OCT 2021; 7:50 PM	(India) Strategic Forces Command	Single mass simulator	—N/a	First user trial
27 OCT 2021; 7:50 PM	According to Ministry of Defence, the test was in line with India's credible minimum deterrence policy with the commitment to ‘No First Use’.			
15 DEC 2022	Canistered TATRA TEL	ITR Launch Complex 4	—N/a	Success
15 DEC 2022	(India) Strategic Forces Command	Single mass simulator	—N/a	First night trial
15 DEC 2022	The test was to validate new technologies and equipment on the missile. Replacing maraging steel with lightweight composite materials made Agni-V, 20 percent lighter. The launch also proved striking capability beyond 7000+ kms. The suspected possibility of an HGV due to the low velocity of projectile seen in night sky was eliminated when a sneakpeak launch footage was released almost an year later.			
20 AUG 2025; 6:56 PM	Canistered TATRA TEL	ITR Launch Complex 4	—N/a	Success
20 AUG 2025; 6:56 PM	DRDO	—N/a	—N/a	Training trial
20 AUG 2025; 6:56 PM	The missile was launched under the aegis of the Strategic Forces Command.			

=== Mission Divyastra ===
Date/Time (IST)	Configuration	Launch Site	Duration	Outcome
Date/Time (IST)	Operator	Launch Site	Duration	Outcome
Date/Time (IST)	Operator	Payload	Range	Function
Date/Time (IST)	Remarks			
11 MAR 2024; 6:56 PM	Canistered TATRA TEL	ITR Launch Complex 4	—N/a	Success
11 MAR 2024; 6:56 PM	DRDO	3-4 x MIRV	—N/a	First MIRV launch
11 MAR 2024; 6:56 PM	First test launch in MIRV configuration. The project directors examined the trajectory and other variables of the missile as recorded by the ballistic missile tracker INS Dhruv to make any operational changes if required. No further tests are planned for MIRV payload.			
8 MAY 2026	Canistered TATRA TEL	Abdul Kalam Island (ITR)	—N/a	Success
8 MAY 2026	DRDO	MIRV	<3,560 km	Second MIRV launch
8 MAY 2026	The missile was described as an advanced Agni missile with multiple MIRV payloads delivered at different ranges spread over a large geographical area over the Indian Ocean. The trajectory of the missile was tracked from lift-off till impact of all payloads by the multiple ground and ship-based telemetry and sensor systems. The flight data confirmed that all mission objectives were met. Senior DRDO officials and Indian Army personnel witnessed the test. A NOTAM had been issued twice since late April for the test.			

== Reactions to testing ==
=== Domestic ===
In India, the success of the launch was received with much acclaim and widespread media coverage. The then Prime Minister of India, Manmohan Singh as well as Defence Minister A K Antony congratulated the DRDO. Missile Program Director Avinash Chander hailed the launch saying it signified giant strides. Kanwal Sibal, former foreign secretary of India wrote, "In reality, while self-restraint and attachment to peace do mark our policies, we choose soft options also because we are conscious of our weakness and lack of military preparedness. [..] China, in any case, possesses missiles with even longer range. Earlier it was India that was vulnerable to Chinese missiles and now the reverse will be true, creating a better balance in deterrence."

Following the successful November 2021 test of the nuclear capable version of Agni-5, the Defence Ministry released the following statement:

“A successful launch of the surface-to-surface ballistic missile, Agni-5, was carried out on October 27, 2021 at approximately 1950 hrs from APJ Abdul Kalam Island, Odisha.”
- Ministry of Defence

Following the successful March 2024 test of the nuclear capable version of Agni-5, the Prime Minister released the following statement on Twitter:

“Proud of our DRDO scientists for Mission Divyastra, the first flight test of indigenously developed Agni-5 missile with Multiple Independently Targetable Re-entry Vehicle (MIRV) technology.” - Narendra Modi, Prime Minister of India

Rajnath Singh, the Defence Minister, praised the scientists and team, describing it as an exceptional success.

=== Other states ===
- China – A spokesman for China's Foreign Ministry said, "China and India are large developing nations. We are not competitors but partners. We believe that both sides should cherish the hard-won good state of affairs at present, and work hard to uphold friendly strategic co-operation to promote joint development and make positive contributions towards maintaining peace and stability in the region." The state-owned China Central Television (CCTV) reported that the test was a historic moment for India, and it shows that India has joined the club of the countries that own ballistic missiles. However, CCTV listed some of the missile's shortcomings and reported that "it does not pose a threat in reality." More negative commentary can be found in Global Times, a state-run tabloid, which reported that India "still lags behind in infrastructure construction, but its society is highly supportive of developing nuclear power and the West chooses to overlook India's disregard of nuclear and missile control treaties" and "warned" India not to "over-estimate its strength". Subsequently, they also claimed that although India may have missiles that can reach all parts of China, India "stands no chance in an overall arms race" with the country. Chinese experts say that the missile actually has the potential to reach targets 8,000 kilometres (5,000 mi) away and that the Indian government had "deliberately downplayed the missile's capability in order to avoid causing concern to other countries".
- Pakistan – Pakistani websites and news agencies prominently displayed news of the launch. An article by the Associated Press reported that Pakistani officials showed no concern, with the foreign office spokesman saying only that India had informed it of the test ahead of time in line with an agreement they have.
- United States – The United States stated that India boasted of an excellent non-proliferation record and that it had engaged with the international community on such issues. A US State Department spokesman said, "We urge all nuclear-capable states to exercise restraint regarding nuclear capabilities. That said, India has a solid non-proliferation record." Moreover, responding to comparisons with North Korea's attempted launch of a long-range rocket that same week, Jay Carney said, "India's record stands in stark contrast to that of North Korea, which has been subject to numerous sanctions, as you know, by the United Nations Security Council."

A Washington-based think tank has claimed that the US is supportive of India's efforts to close missile gap with China and is comfortable with the progress being made by New Delhi in this regard. Lisa Curtis, senior research fellow for South Asia, and Baker Spring, research fellow in National Security Policy, at The Heritage Foundation, a conservative think tank said in a commentary, "The lack of US condemnation of India's latest missile test demonstrates that the US is comfortable with Indian progress in the nuclear and missile fields and appreciates India's need to meet the emerging strategic challenge posed by rising China. It is telling that no country has criticized India's missile test", the US experts wrote. "The US change in position with regard to Indian missile capabilities demonstrates how far the US-India relationship has evolved over the last decade", Curtis and Spring said.

=== International organisations ===
- NATO – NATO Secretary General Anders Fogh Rasmussen stated that they did not think India was a missile threat, nor a threat to NATO and its allies, despite India's advancement in missile technology.

== See also ==
- India and weapons of mass destruction

Related development

- Agni I
- Agni II
- Agni III
- Agni IV
- Agni VI
- Agni Prime
- K Series missiles

Related lists

- List of nuclear weapons
- List of states with nuclear weapons
- List of intercontinental ballistic missiles
