= Agni-III =

Indian intermediate-range ballistic missile

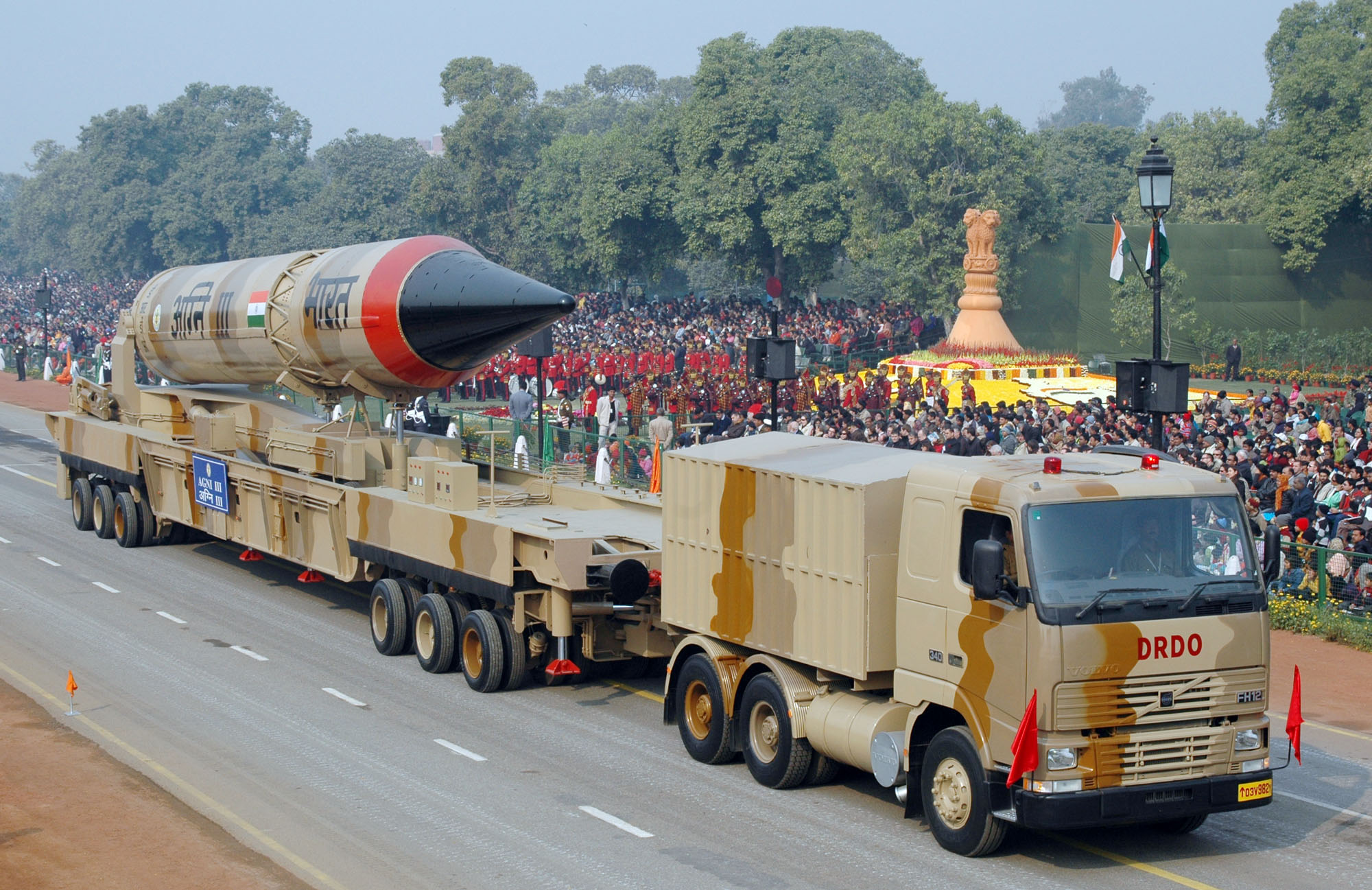
- 21 September 2012 Agni-III missile test
- Type: Intermediate-range ballistic missile
- Place of origin: India

Service history
- In service: Active
- Used by: Strategic Forces Command

Production history
- Designer: Defence Research and Development Organisation
- Manufacturer: Bharat Dynamics Limited
- Unit cost: ₹250 million (US$3 million) – ₹350 million (US$4 million)

Specifications
- Mass: 50,000 kg
- Length: 17 m
- Diameter: 2.0 m
- Warhead: Conventional, thermobaric, nuclear
- Warhead weight: 2,490 kg
- Engine: Multi-stage solid-propellant
- Propellant: Hydroxyl-terminated polybutadiene
- Operational range: 3,500 km
- Flight altitude: > 450 km
- Guidance system: Mid-course: RLG-INS + multi-GNSS; Terminal: IIR homing, radar scene matching, ARH
- Steering system: Flex-nozzle thrust vectoring (first and second stage)
- Accuracy: 40 m CEP
- Launch platform: 8 × 8 transporter erector launcher; Rail mobile launcher

The Agni-III (lit. 'Fire') is an Indian intermediate-range ballistic missile inducted into service in 2011 as the successor of the Agni-II. It has a range of 3,500 kilometres (2,200 mi) and can reach targets deep inside neighbouring countries including Pakistan and China.

== Introduction ==
India's credible minimum deterrence envisaged a nuclear triad of counter-strike capability which required a long-range missile to provide robust second strike capability. India developed a larger missile, with a heavier payload and longer range in a compact configuration.

== Description ==
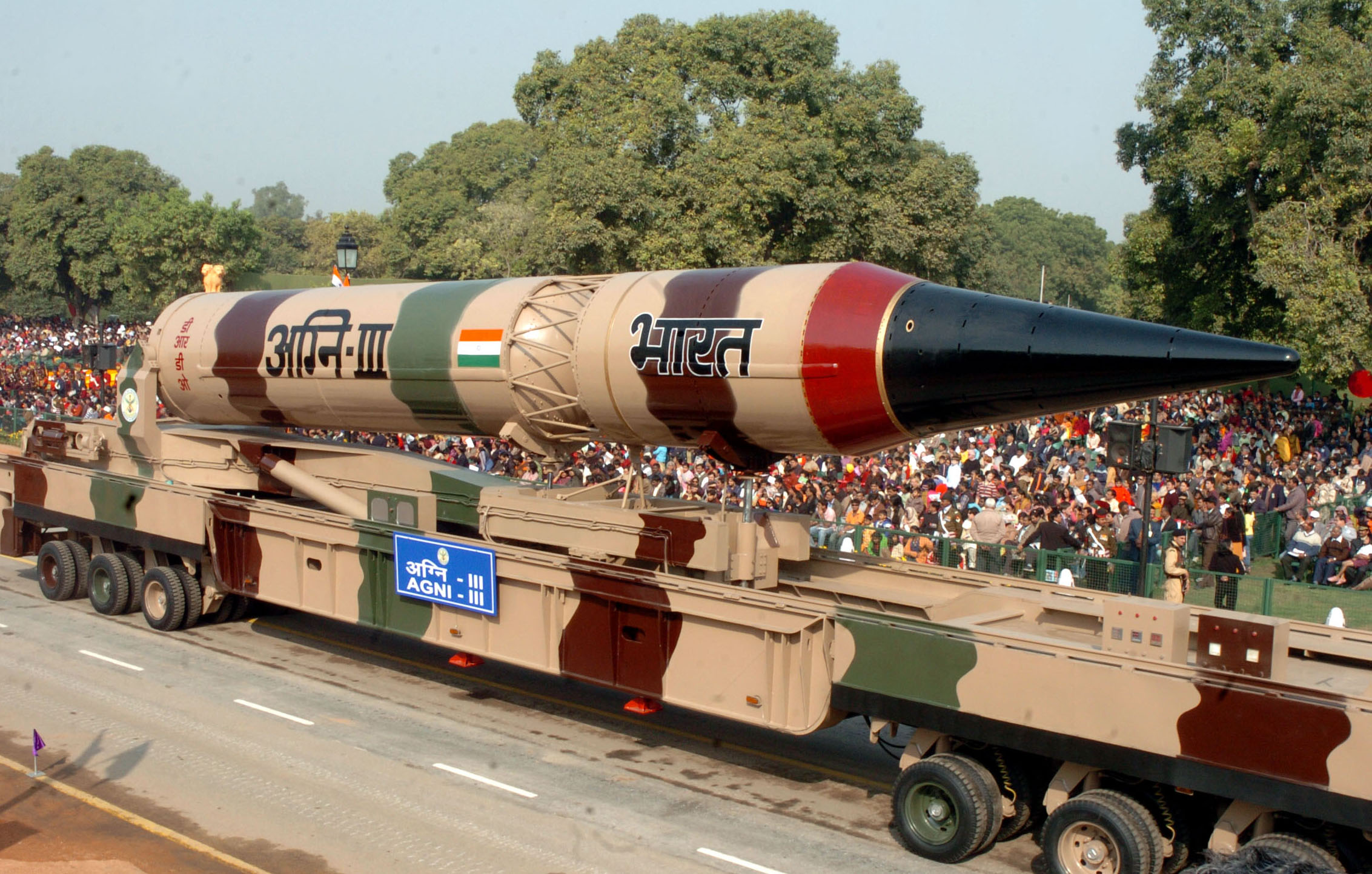
Indian Army with Agni-III missile during the Indian Republic Day parade in New Delhi on January 26, 2009.

The Agni-III was developed as the successor to the Agni-II. Designed by the Defence Research and Development Organisation (DRDO), Agni-III is a two-stage ballistic missile capable of nuclear weapons delivery. DRDO formed a separate propulsion plant in September 2001 to develop large-sized solid-propellant rocket engines, including the infrastructure for propellant casting. The stubby, two-stage solid-fuel missile is compact enough for easy mobility and flexible deployment on a number of surface and sub-surface platforms.

The missile is equipped with sophisticated navigation, guidance and control systems and advanced on-board computer systems. The electronic systems are designed to withstand greater vibration, heat and noise. A high-performance, indigenous ring laser gyro-based inertial navigation system was flight-tested for the first time on 7 Feb 2010.

The two stages of Agni-III has an overall diameter of 2 metres (6 ft 7 in). Initially, The mass of first-stage is about 32 tonnes and 7.7 metres (25 ft) long, and 10 tonnes and 3.3 metres (11 ft) long for second stage. The missile was expected to support a wide range of warhead configurations, with a 4,500-kilometre (2,800 mi) range and a total payload weight of 2,490 kilograms (5,490 lb). The ground support system and launcher are developed by Research & Development Establishment (Engineers).

The circular error probable (CEP) of Agni-III is within 40 metres (130 ft). The US Air Force's National Air and Space Intelligence Center estimated that in June 2017, fewer than 10 launchers had been deployed.

== Propulsion ==
The Agni-III has two solid-fuelled stages and an overall diameter of 2 metres (6 ft 7 in), compatible with an Indian sub-surface launch system which has a 2.3-metre-diameter (7.5 ft) launch-tube aperture. The first-stage booster weighs around 32 tonne and is made of advanced carbon-composite materials to provide high payload fraction (mass fraction). It is 7.7 metres (25 ft) long; the second stage weighs around 11 tonne, made of maraging steel, is 3.3 metres (11 ft) long and has vectoring nozzles for flight-trajectory control.

== Flight tests ==
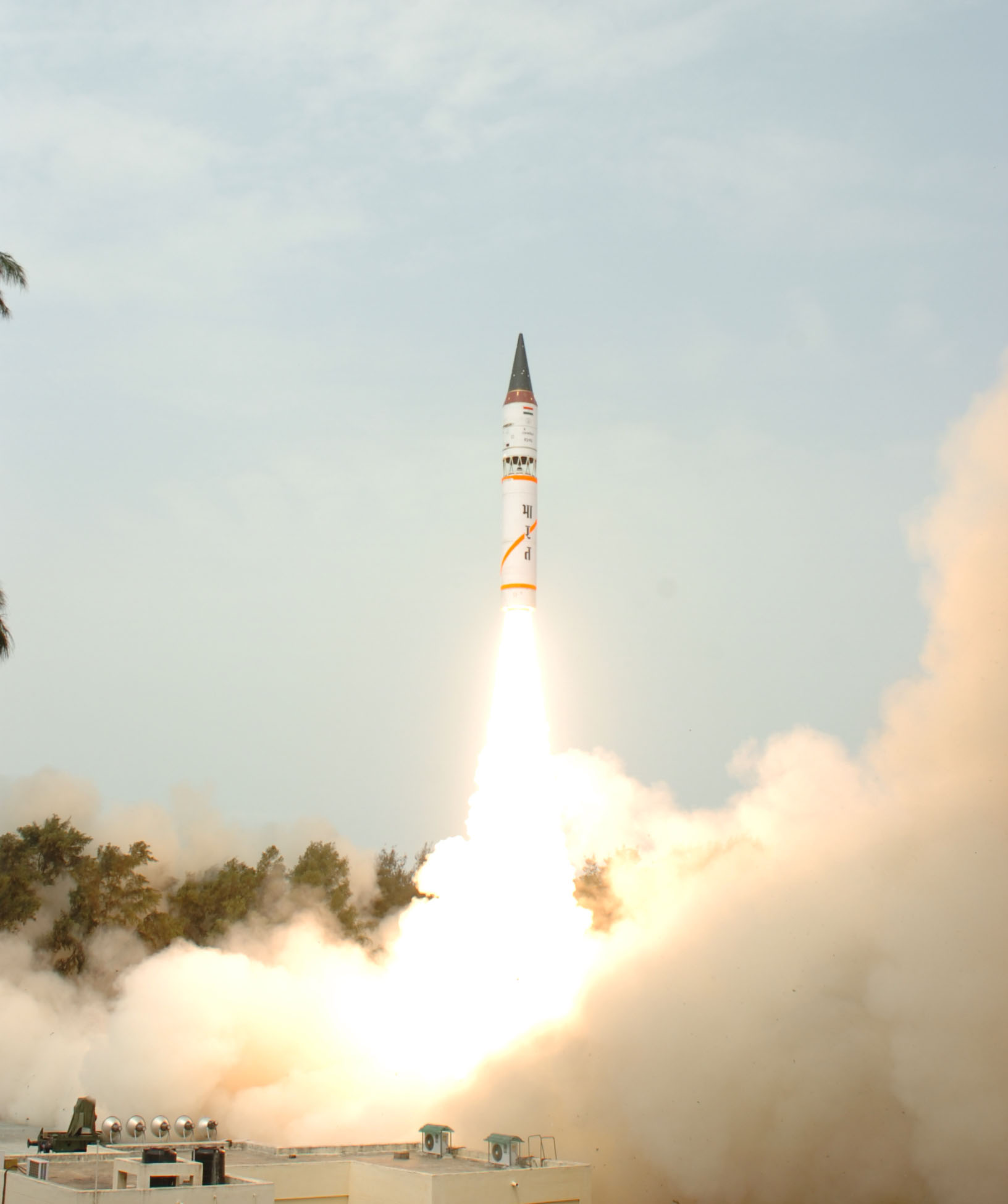
The Agni-III was successfully launched from Wheeler Island on 7 May 2008.

On 9 July 2006, the first test of the Agni-III was conducted on Abdul Kalam Island (then known as Wheeler Island), near the Bhadrak coast. The launch was unsuccessful; the missile fell into the sea off the coast of Odisha, short of the target. According to the Defence Research and Development Organisation, the failure was due to a first-stage anomaly of recirculating hot gases which entered the missile-base shroud and damaged electronic components. Indian Defence Minister Pranab Mukherjee called it a "partial success" (a euphemism indicating that the test generated useful data for diagnosis and correction), since the missile was air-borne for five minutes instead of the expected 15. The missile was earlier scheduled to be launched in the first quarter of 2004.

On 12 April 2007, Agni-III was successfully test-fired on from Abdul Kalam Island, off the coast of Odisha. India's Cabinet Committee on Security announced, "This test confirms the extent of India's nuclear reach and India's nuclear deterrence as the missile can accurately hit targets at distance more than 3000 km away". The Agni-III is the most powerful and capable of India's missile inventory; capable of carrying a variety of warheads (including nuclear warheads), it can be launched from a number of platforms and extends India's regional power projection.

On 7 May 2008, the missile was again test-fired successfully. After a flight of about 15 minutes, defence scientists confirmed that the test was successful and the missile met all requirements. With a velocity of 5,000 meters per second, the Agni-III has a range of 3,500 kilometres (2,200 mi); new navigation software will increase the missile's accuracy and lethality. The successful 2008 test opened the door for the next-generation Indian ICBM Agni V, with a 5,000-to-6,000-kilometre (3,100 to 3,700 mi) range. The Agni-III's development test was postponed for unknown reasons in August 2009.

Agni series missile range

On 7 February 2010, it was again tested successfully on Abdul Kalam Island in Odisha. The missile hit the target accurately (witnessed by two ships near the target), and met all mission objectives. Supporting a range of warhead configurations, the Agni-III has a total payload weight of 2,490 kilograms (5,490 lb). The two-stage, solid-fuel missile is small enough for easy mobility and flexible deployment from a number of surface and sub-surface platforms. The test validated its nuclear-triggering mechanism, indicating that the Agni-III is intended for strategic nuclear deterrence. The test launch was part of the missile's pre-induction into the Indian Army.

India's defence minister announced in August of that year that the Agni-III was ready for induction into the country's armed forces, and its induction was reported in June 2011. In September 2012, it was reported that a missile group of Agni-IIIs was being raised.

On 21 September 2012, the Strategic Forces Command successfully test-fired an Agni III missile from a rail mobile launcher. The missile was again successfully tested on 23 December 2013, on 16 April 2015, and on 27 April 2017.

On 30 November 2019, the missile's first night trial was conducted. The test reportedly failed, with the missile beginning to diverge from its planned flight trajectory after 115 kilometres (71 mi) and mission control aborting the flight. A manufacturing defect was thought to be a possible cause of the failure.

On 6 February 2026, the Strategic Forces Command successfully test fired an Agni III missile from the Integrated Test Range, Chandipur, Odisha. The launch validated all operational and technical parameters.

== See also ==
Agni Missile family

- Agni-I
- Agni-II
- Agni-IV
- Agni-V
- Agni Prime
- Agni-VI
