= Agni-I =

Indian short-range ballistic missile

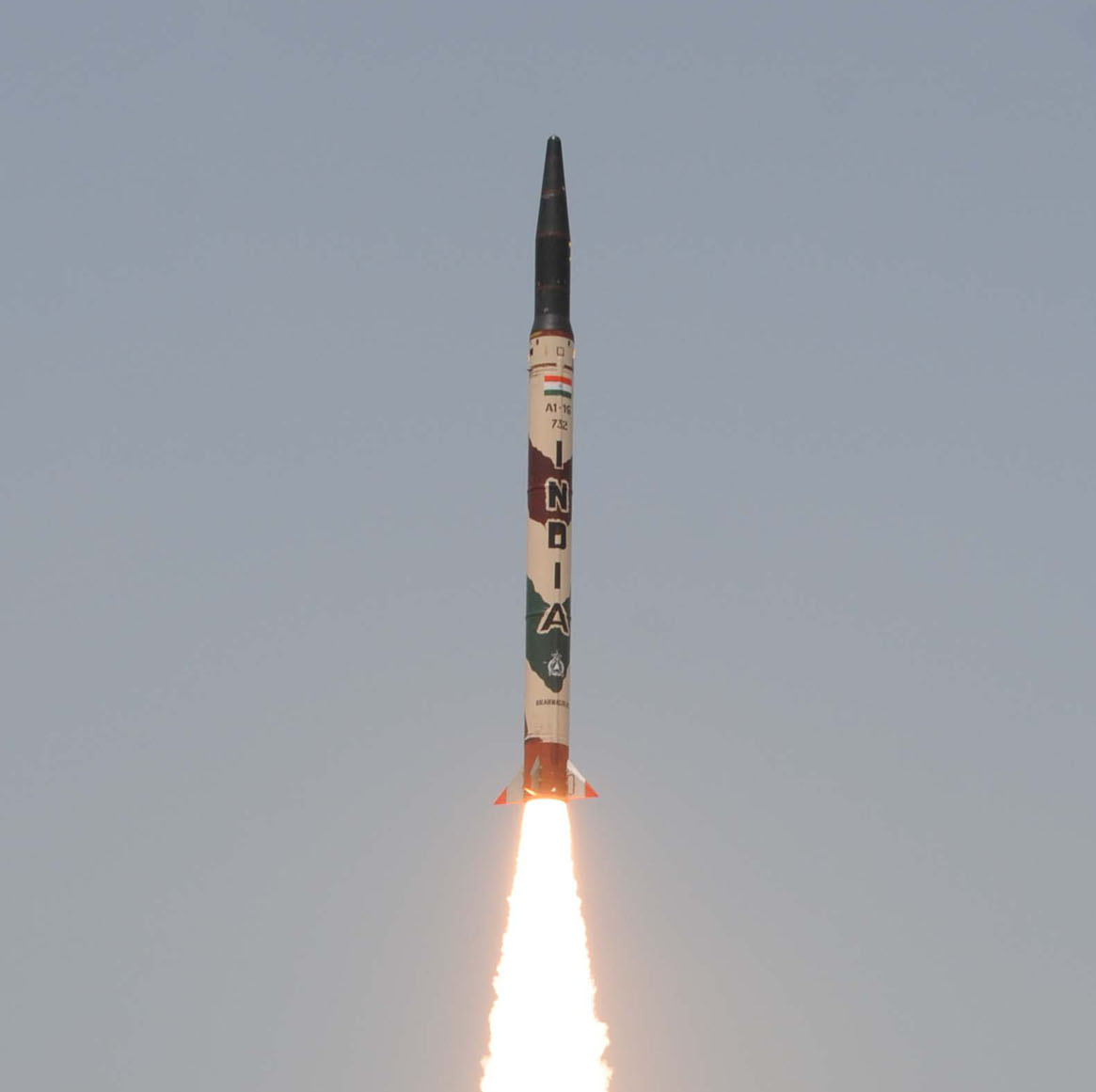
- Agni-I during a test flight on 13 July 2012
- Type: Short Range Ballistic Missile
- Place of origin: India

Service history
- In service: 1979—present
- Used by: Strategic Forces Command

Production history
- Designer: Defence Research and Development Organisation
- Manufacturer: Bharat Dynamics Limited
- Unit cost: ₹25 crore (US$2.6 million) to ₹35 crore (US$3.6 million)
- No. built: 70 (2017 est.)

Specifications
- Mass: 12,000 kg
- Length: 15 m
- Diameter: 1.0 m
- Warhead: Conventional high explosive-unitary, penetration, cluster munition, incendiary, thermobaric, strategic nuclear weapon
- Warhead weight: 1,000 kg (2,200 lb) - 2,500 kg (5,500 lb)
- Engine: Single stage composite rocket motor
- Propellant: Solid fuel
- Operational range: 700–1,200 km
- Flight ceiling: 370 km
- Maximum speed: 2.5 km/s (9000 km/h)
- Guidance system: Mid-course: RLG-INS + multi-GNSS; Terminal: Radar scene matching
- Accuracy: 25 m CEP
- Launch platform: 8 × 8 Tatra transporter erector launcher/rail mobile

Agni-I (lit. 'Fire') is a short-range ballistic missile that was developed by DRDO of India in the Integrated Guided Missile Development Program. It is a single-stage missile that was developed after the Kargil War to fill the gap between the 250 km (160-mile) range of the Prithvi-II missile and the 2,500 km (1,600-mile) range of the Agni-II. It was first launched from a road mobile launcher at Integrated Test Range (ITR), Wheeler Island, on 25 January 2002. Less than 75 launchers are deployed.

== History and development ==
Agni-I was first tested at the Interim Test Range in Chandipur at 7:17AM on 22 May 1989, and is capable of carrying a conventional payload of 1,000 kg (2,200 lb) or a nuclear warhead. Agni missiles consist of one (short range) or two stages (intermediate range). These are rail and road mobile and powered by solid propellants.

The Agni I has a range of 700–1,200 km. They are claimed to be a part of the "Minimum credible deterrence".

Agni-I is a single stage, solid fuel, road and rail mobile, Short-range ballistic missile (SRBM). The need for the Agni-I was felt after the Kargil war with Pakistan. It took DRDO 15 months to develop the Agni-I after having completed Agni-II development. It is propelled by solid fuel. Maneuvering RV body-lift aerodynamics give it the ability to correct trajectory errors and reduce thermal stresses. The MRV has a velocity correction package to correct launch trajectory variances. Some Agni RV versions use a set of solid fueled thruster cartridges of predetermined impulse, allowing the onboard guidance controller to trim velocity, using discrete combination of impulse quanta along the desired spatial orientation. The 15-metre-tall (49 ft) Agni-I missile, weighing about 12 tonnes, is capable of carrying both conventional as well as nuclear warheads of 1,000 kg.

== Replacement ==
DRDO is now developing an upgraded two stage variant called Agni-1P by borrowing the newer technologies from Agni-IV and Agni-V platform to increase accuracy and reliability. On 28 June 2021, DRDO successfully test fired Agni-1P from Abdul Kalam island. This is a two-stage solid fuel missile that can be stored in canister and transported through road and rail. It is a new class of missile in Agni Series launched by DRDO which is half the weight of Agni-III and carries newly developed guidance package and population system covering a distance of 1000–2000 km.

== Operational history ==
Agni missile range.

Indian Army regularly conducts user trials of the missile mainly to train the user team to launch the missile. The tests are normally conducted by the Strategic Forces Command (SFC) with logistic support from Defence Research and Development Organisation (DRDO). Such User trials were carried out multiple times since 2018, with the first one being on October 5, 2007, from Wheelers' Island and the latest one being on November 27, 2015. Another successful user trial was conducted on March 14, 2016, from launch pad-4 of the Integrated Test Range (ITR) at Abdul Kalam Island. Multiple successful user trials of the missile have been conducted on 22 November 2016 and 6 February 2018 by the SFC.

On 17 July 2025, Agni-I was again tested as part of a periodic routine trial by SFC. Though this is not the first instance that the SFC conducted trials of two nuclear-capable missiles — Agni-1 and Prithvi-2 — on the same day. Another test for the Agni-I was conducted on 22 May 2026 under the aegis of the SFC.

== Operators ==
Agni-I is used by the 334 Missile Group at Secunderabad, under the Strategic Forces Command (SFC) of the Indian Army,

== See also ==
- BrahMos
- List of missiles
- Agni Missile family
  - Agni-II
  - Agni-III
  - Agni-IV
  - Agni-V
  - Agni-P
  - Agni-VI
