= Agni-P =

Indian-designed medium-range ballistic missile

Agni-Prime
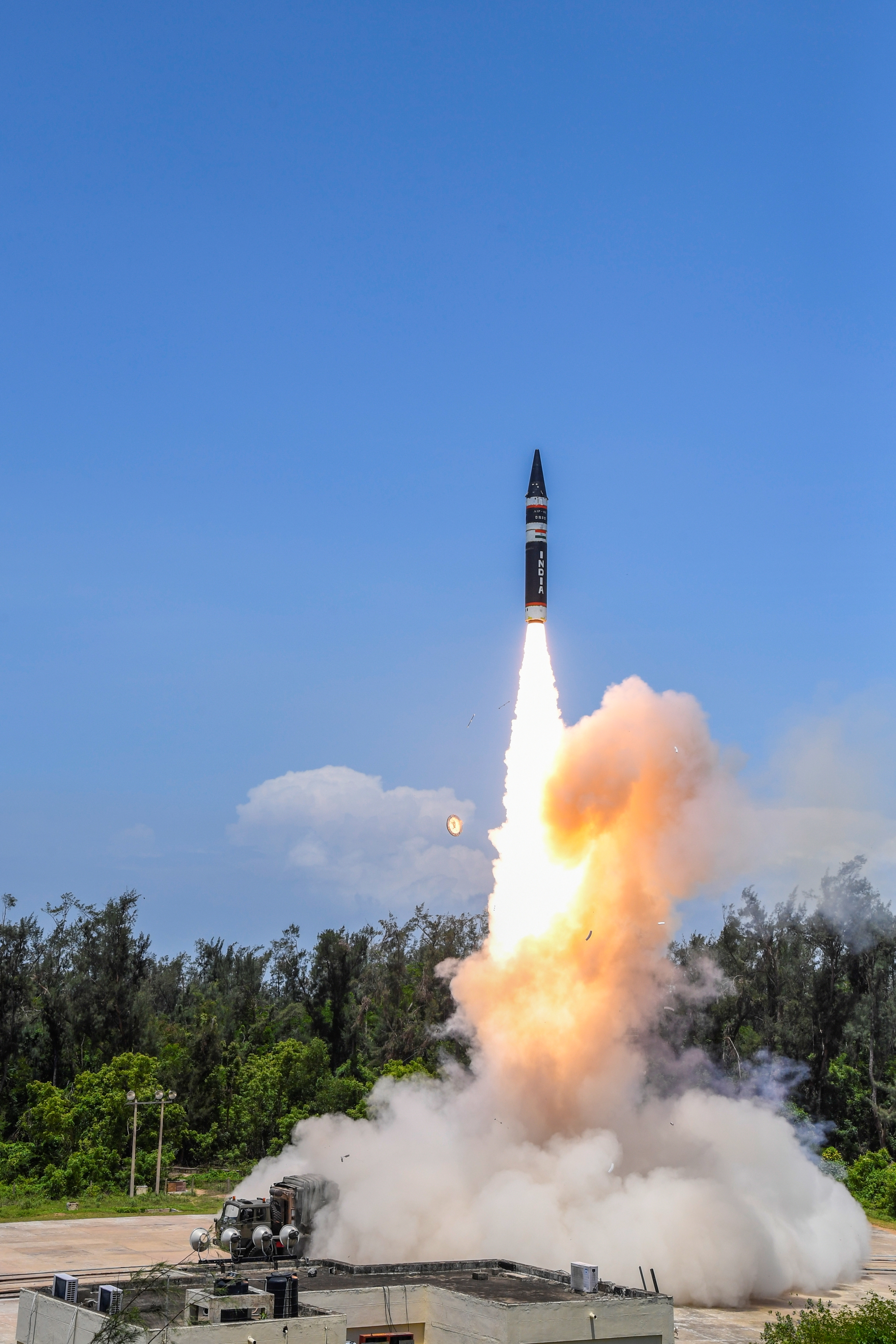
- The Agni-P, photographed during its first test launch in 2021.
- Type: Medium-range ballistic missile
- Place of origin: India

Service history
- In service: Pre-induction Trials
- Used by: Strategic Forces Command

Production history
- Designer: Defence Research and Development Organisation
- Manufacturer: Bharat Dynamics Limited

Specifications
- Mass: 11,000 kg (24,000 lb)
- Length: 10.5 m (34 ft 5 in)
- Diameter: 1.15 m (3 ft 9 in)
- Warhead: 2 × Maneuverable reentry vehicle (planned) or MIRV (high explosive, thermobaric and nuclear)
- Warhead weight: 1,500 kg (3,300 lb) – 3,000 kg (6,600 lb)
- Engine: Two stage rocket motor
- Propellant: Solid fuel
- Operational range: 1,000–2,000 kilometres (620–1,240 mi)
- Guidance system: RLG-INS + redundant micro-INS and digital control + multi-GNSS
- Accuracy: 10 m CEP
- Launch platform: Mobile rail-launcher Transporter erector launcher

Agni-Prime or Agni-P (Sanskrit: अग्नि; IAST: Agni; lit. Fire) is a two-stage, surface to surface, canister-launched, road mobile and solid-fueled medium-range ballistic missile being developed by India's Defence Research and Development Organisation (DRDO) as the sixth missile in the Agni series. It is intended to be deployed in the operational service of the Strategic Forces Command, and to feature significant upgrades to the composite motor casing, a maneuverable reentry vehicle (MaRV) along with improved propellants, navigation and guidance systems.

== History ==
In 2016, Indian media began reporting that DRDO was developing a successor to the Agni-I called Agni-1P, which would feature two stages that borrowed the newer technologies from Agni-IV and Agni-V to increase accuracy and reliability. According to a senior scientist from the DRDO's missile complex in Hyderabad:

“As our ballistic missiles grew in range, our technology grew in sophistication. Now the early, short-range missiles, which incorporate older technologies, will be replaced by missiles with more advanced technologies. Call it backward integration of technology”

India started working on area denial weapons after China developed the DF-21D and DF-26B ballistic missiles with nuclear capability to counter the US Navy, as well as capable of threatening Andersen Air Force Base. As a counterbalance, the progress of Agni-P became a crucial part of India's Indo-Pacific strategy to tackle China's plan of having five or six aircraft carrier battle groups by 2035 to cover both the Pacific Ocean and Indian Ocean.

== Description ==
=== Propulsion ===
Agni-P is a two-stage, solid-propellant missile. All stages uses composite propellant, where the powder oxidizer is mixed with a metal fuel along with a bind being put in place. Aluminium is used as fuel; its specific energy density gives it the capability to deliver high performance. This gives the missile, a better payload ratio and thus a larger payload that has been mounted on a missile can be lifted up with a less quantity of propellant. It is a new class of missile in Agni Series which is half the weight of Agni-III. Both first and second stage of Agni-P are made up of corrosion free composite material for the purpose of weight reduction, which was mastered during Agni-V project.

=== Range and mobility ===
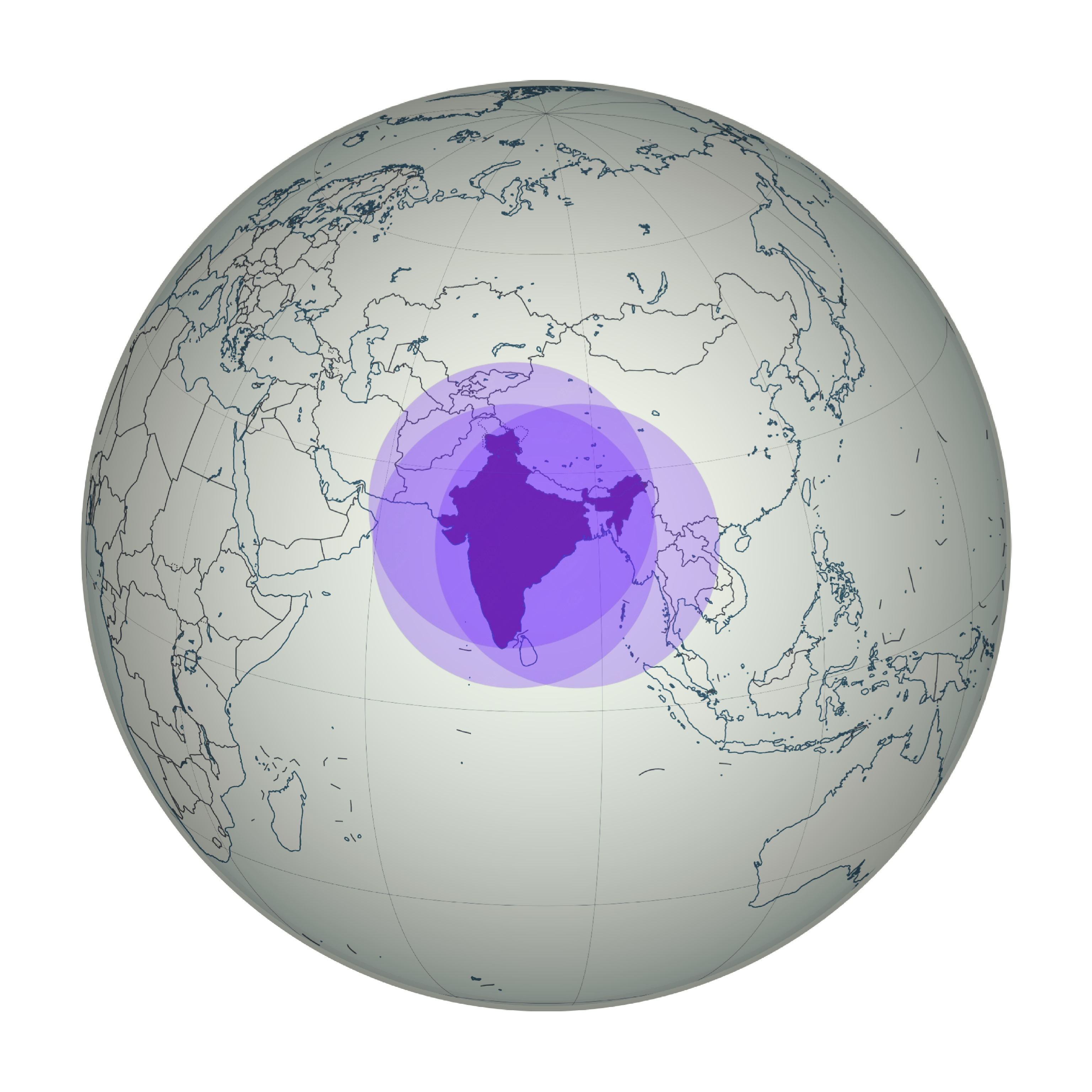
Strike range envelope of Agni-P centered at AFS Nagpur, AFS Gwalior and Wheeler ITR

The missile can cover a maximum distance of 2000 km with 1.5 ton payload. According to analysts, Agni-P is primarily aimed at countering Pakistan's forces as its range is insufficient to reach all parts of mainland China. Given the missile's range, analysts at the International Institute for Strategic Studies believe that Agni-P primarily counters Pakistan and intends to replace older and less compact short-range ballistic missiles such as the Agni-I and Agni-II.

The missile is stored in a hermetically sealed tandem twin canister launcher and is transported through road and rail. This process enables the warhead to be mated and stored with the missile, significantly reducing the time required for preparation and launch. It uses cold launch mechanism and can be fired in salvo mode. When a cold launch of a canisterised missile is done and when it uses a solid propellant, then it would be an edge for India for conducting nuclear strikes in a shorter amount of time from any terrain.

The test launches of the missile seemingly uses a canistered 12x12 axle TATRA truck, it may be for test purposes only, the compactness of the missile points to a future possibility of a smaller and more mobile launcher than the cumbersome Agni-I mobile-erector launchers (MELs) and the rail-mounted Agni-II launchers. This increased mobility could provide India with greater deployment options and the canisterisation providing added protection from external elements for prolonged periods. The launch platform is expected to be canistered from an 8x8 axle TATRA BEML Transporter erector launcher.

=== Guidance and warhead ===
Agni-P utilizes dual redundant navigation and guidance system based on an advanced ring laser gyro-based inertial navigation system (INS) and a modern micro inertial navigation system (MINS), and utilizes technology previously incorporated in Agni-IV and Agni-V. The missile is optionally augmented by GPS and NaVIC satellite navigation systems.

Agni-P can be mated to a Maneuverable Reentry Vehicle (MaRV). The warhead is reportedly equipped with four delta fins and can utilize its terminal maneuverability to make itself more difficult for missile defense systems to intercept. According to V. K. Saraswat, MIRV and MaRV warhead technology were already in advanced stages of development for Agni-VI in 2013. DRDO is expected by some Indian defense sources to be planning to develop an anti-ship variant of the Agni-P missile platform.

=== Deployment ===
The missile will be operationalised under Strategic Forces Command (SFC) after completing the pre-induction trials. The first pre-induction night launch conducted by the SFC in June 2023 after three successful developmental trials of the missile, validating the accuracy and reliability of the system. Senior officials from DRDO and Strategic Forces Command witnessed the successful flight-test, which has paved the way for induction of the system into the Armed Forces.

== Testing ==
Agni-P Launch Log
Date/Time (IST)	Configuration	Launch Site	Outcome
Date/Time (IST)	Operator	Launch Site	Outcome
Date/Time (IST)	Operator	Payload	Function
Date/Time (IST)	Remarks		
28 JUN 2021; 10:55 AM	Canistered road mobile TEL	ITR Launch Complex 4	Success
28 JUN 2021; 10:55 AM	DRDO	2 x MaRV	First test launch
28 JUN 2021; 10:55 AM	Various telemetry and radar stations positioned along the eastern coast tracked and monitored the missile. The missile followed text book trajectory, meeting all mission objectives with high level of accuracy.		
18 DEC 2021; 11:06 AM	Canistered road mobile TEL	ITR Launch Complex 4	Success
18 DEC 2021; 11:06 AM	DRDO	? x MaRV	Second test launch
18 DEC 2021; 11:06 AM	The missile followed text book trajectory meeting all mission objectives with high level of accuracy as per the tracking by telemetry, radar, electro-optical stations and down range ships positioned along the eastern coast. This second flight-test has proven the reliable performance of all the advanced technologies and additional features integrated into the system.		
21 OCT 2022; 9:45 AM	Canistered road mobile TEL	ITR Launch Complex 4	Success
21 OCT 2022; 9:45 AM	DRDO	? x MaRV	Third test launch
21 OCT 2022; 9:45 AM	During the test flight, the missile travelled the maximum range and all test objectives were successfully met. With this third consecutive successful flight test of the missile, the accuracy and reliability of the system has been established. Performance of system has been validated using the data obtained by a number of range instrumentation like Radar, Telemetry and Electro Optical Tracking systems deployed at different locations including two down range ships at terminal point to cover entire trajectory.		
User Trial Launches
07 JUN 2023	Canistered road mobile TEL	ITR Launch Complex 4	Success
07 JUN 2023	(India) Strategic Forces Command	? x MaRV	First night trial
07 JUN 2023	This was the first pre-induction night launch conducted by the users after three successful developmental trials of the missile, validating the accuracy and reliability of the system. Range Instrumentation like Radar, Telemetry and Electro Optical Tracking Systems were deployed at different locations, including two down-range ships, at the terminal point to capture flight data covering the entire trajectory of the vehicle.		
03 APR 2024; 07:00 PM	Canistered road mobile TEL	ITR Launch Complex 4	Success
03 APR 2024; 07:00 PM	(India) Strategic Forces Command	? x MaRV	Second night trial
03 APR 2024; 07:00 PM	This test was the second night trail conducted by Strategic Forces Command (SFC), along with Defence Research and Development Organisation (DRDO). The test met all the trial objectives validating its reliable performance, as confirmed from the data captured by a number of range sensors deployed at different locations, including two downrange ships placed at the terminal point.		
24 SEP 2025	Rail-Based Mobile Launcher	ITR	Success
24 SEP 2025	DRDO	? x MaRV	First rail launch
24 SEP 2025	The test was conducted by DRDO, along with SFC, under a full operational scenario. The rail mobile launcher allows for quick response in low visibility situations and offers cross-country mobility. The independently powered launch system contains all the features required for autonomous launch, including advanced communication and protective systems. The launch fulfilled all mission requirements, and the flight path was monitored by the sensors on the ground. The test proved complete operational readiness and confirmed the missile's performance in a real-time deployment setting. It improved India's second strike capability and the ability to sustain key assets.		

== Gallery of test launches ==
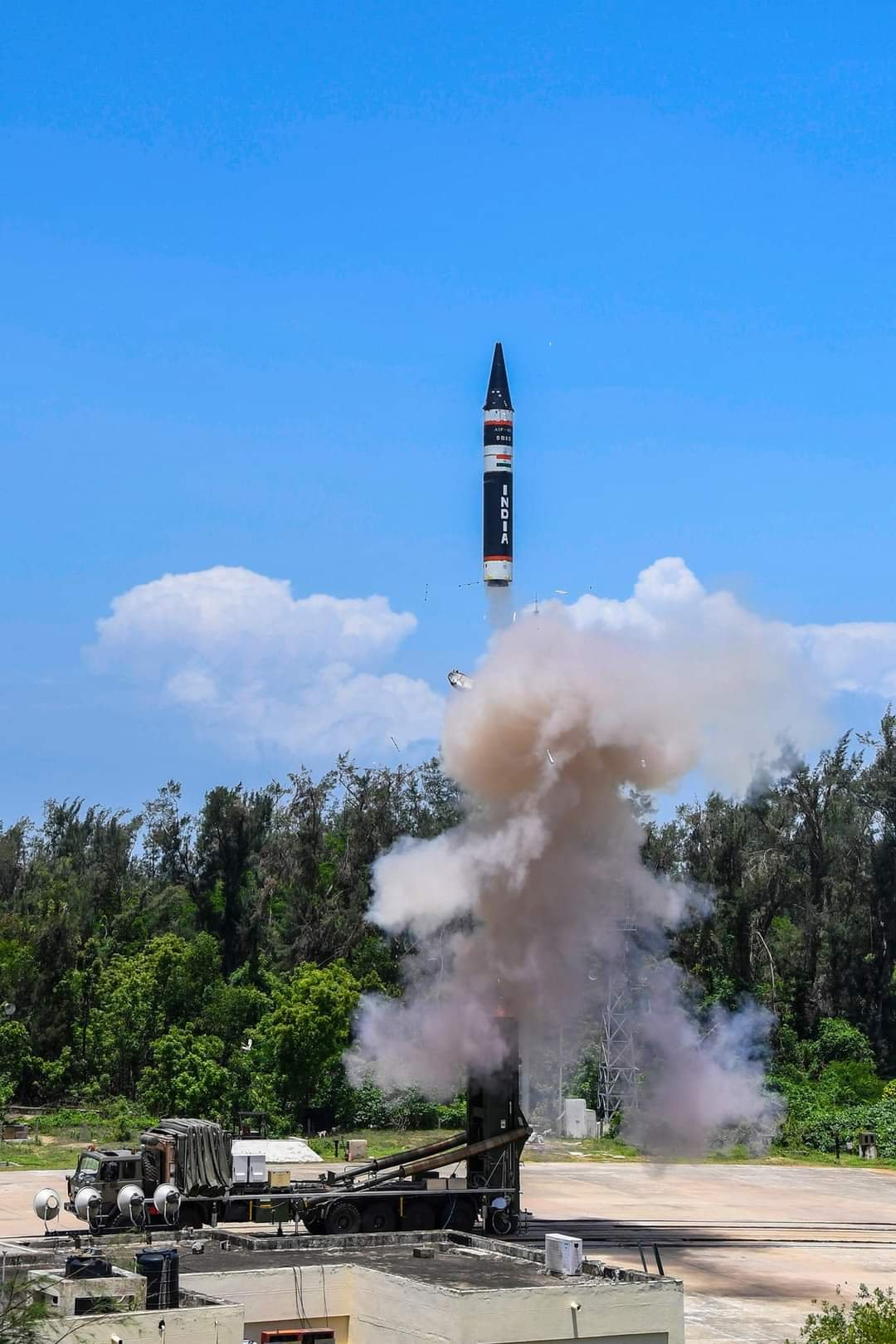
Cold launch from TATRA TEL

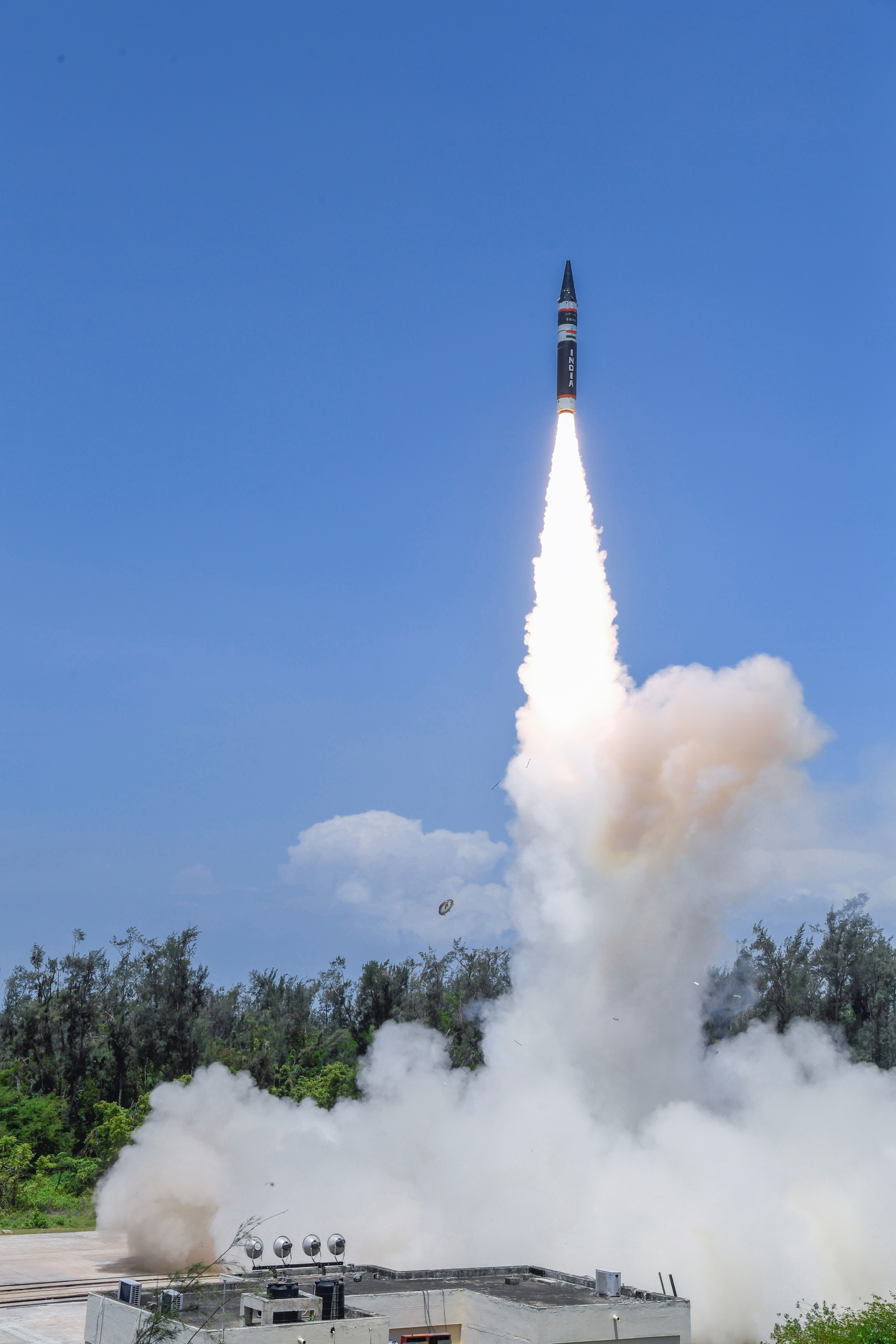
Test launch on 28 June 2021

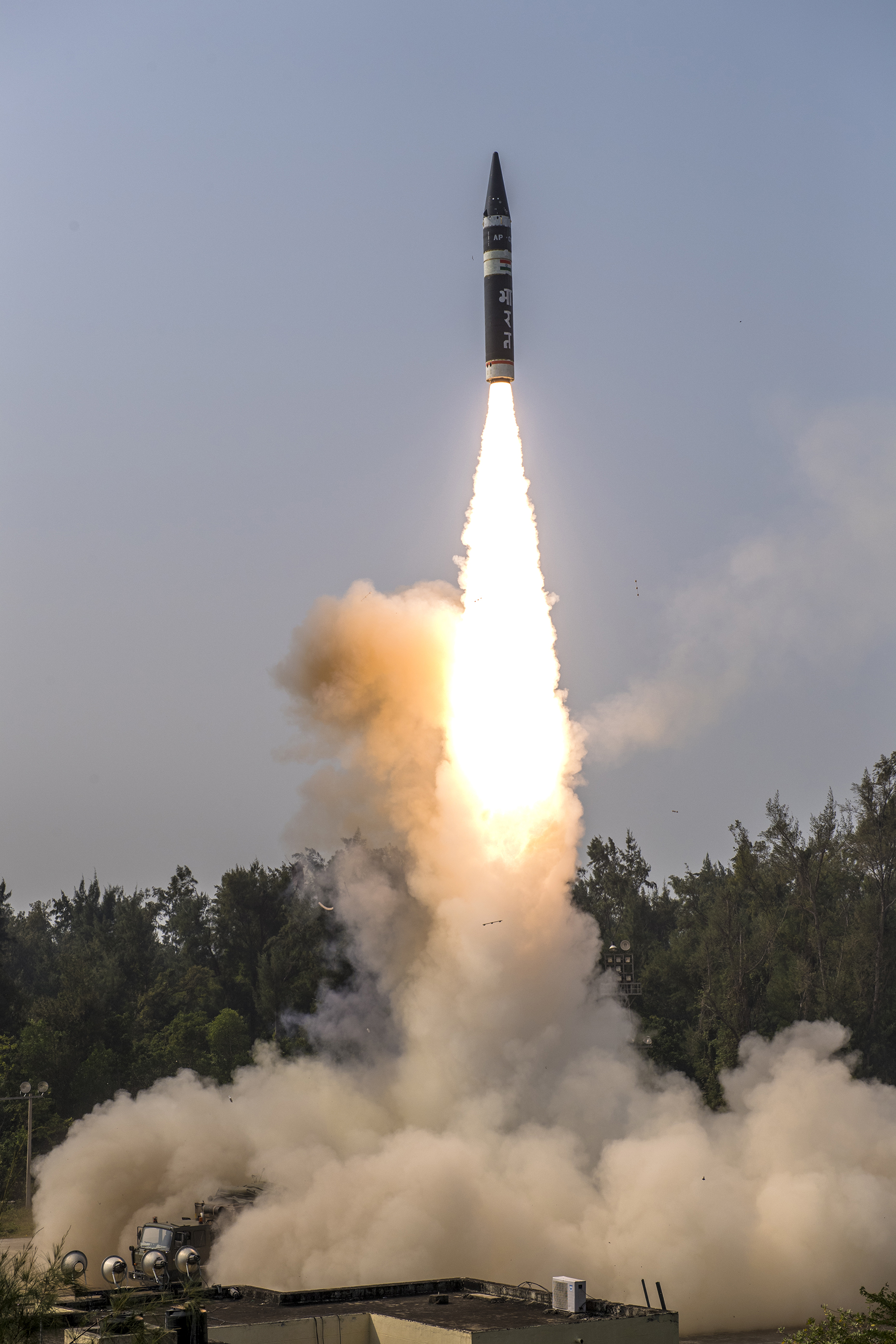
Test launch on 18 Dec. 2021

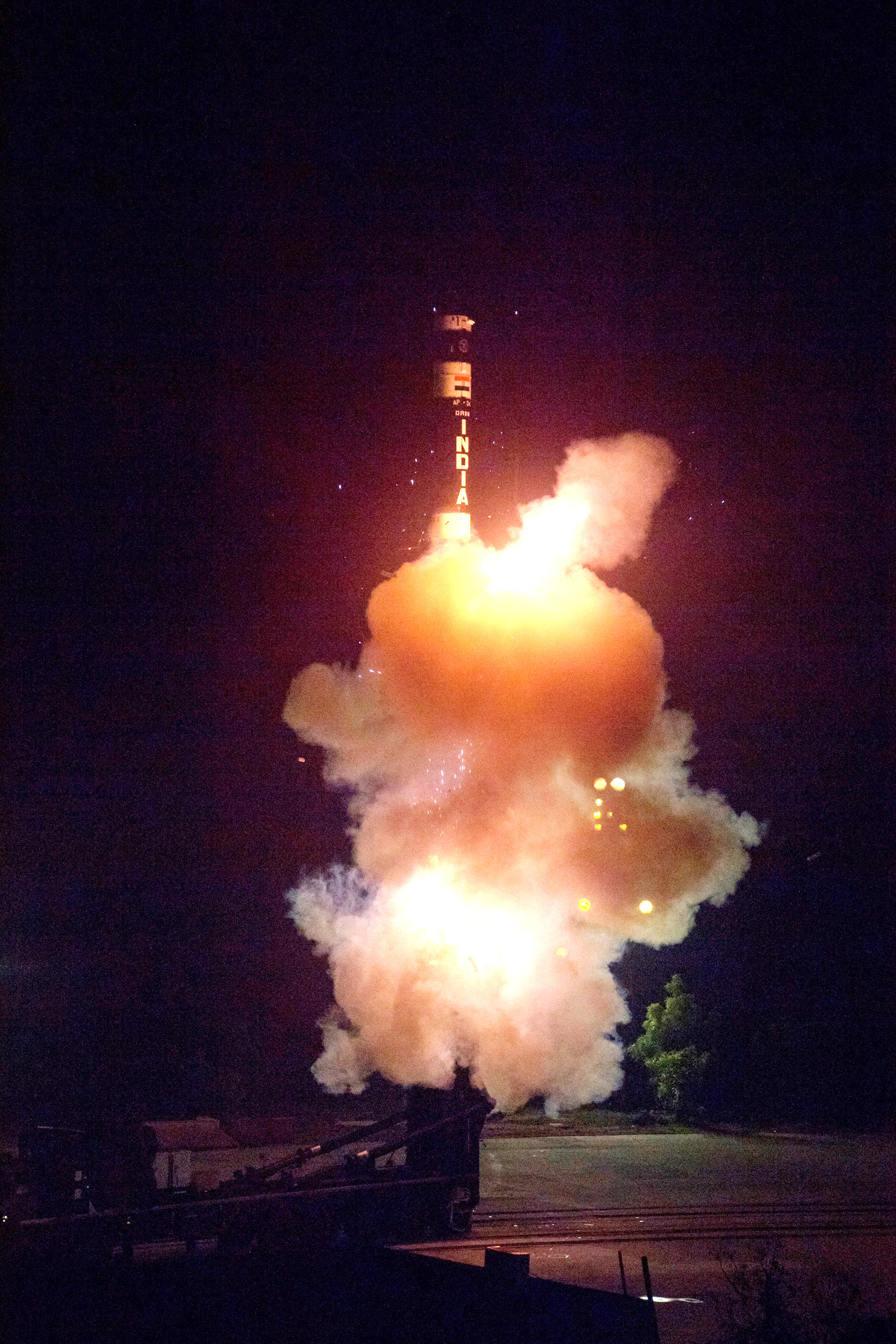
Night trial on 7 June 2023

== Reactions to testing ==
In June 2021, India tested the nuclear capable version of Agni-P successfully, followingly the post on social media platform X by Defense Minister was

"Congratulations to DRDO for the maiden successful flight test of Agni P, advanced variant of Agni class of missiles. I compliment the efforts of the team behind this mission.

Many advance technologies including Composites, Propulsion Systems, innovative Guidance and Control mechanisms and state of the art navigation systems have been introduced.

The Agni P missile would further strengthen India's Credible Deterrence capabilities.”
- Defense Minister of India, Shri Rajnath Singh

Indian defence experts view it as part of work in progress towards an advance anti-ship ballistic missile (ASBM) development for enhancing future sea denial capability against Chinese carrier battle groups in the Indian Ocean Region (IOR).

== Further development ==
=== BM-04 ===
BM-04
- Type: Medium-range ballistic missile
- Place of origin: India

Service history
- In service: Under development
- Used by: Integrated Rocket Force (intended)

Production history
- Designer: Defence Research and Development Organisation

Specifications
- Mass: 11,500 kg (25,400 lb) (model)
- Length: 10.2 m (33 ft 6 in) (model)
- Diameter: 1.2 m (3 ft 11 in) (model)
- Warhead: Proposed boostglide vehicle with conventional warhead
- Warhead weight: Proposed 500 kg (1,100 lb)
- Engine: Two stage rocket motor
- Propellant: Solid fuel
- Operational range: Proposed 1,500 kilometres (930 mi)
- Guidance system: Proposed INS + multi-GNSS
- Launch platform: Canister-based 12×12 Tatra truck TEL

==== Background ====
DRDO has developed a number of missiles for the Indian Armed Forces. These include the K Missile family, the Prithvi series, the Agni series, Pralay, Prahaar and Shaurya. With the exception of the Pralay and Prahaar missiles, which carry conventional warheads with a restricted range of up to 150–500 km (93–311 mi) and are intended for tactical battlefield assistance, the majority of the long-range missiles have nuclear warheads. The development of a conventionally armed missile with a range of more than 1,500 km (930 mi) was therefore deemed necessary in order to counter ship-based threats in the Indian Ocean, Bay of Bengal, and Arabian Sea, as well as land-based threats from beyond the Line of Actual Control (LAC) in the provinces of Xinjiang, Tibet, and Yunnan. To address this requirement, by September 2022, DRDO had completed design work of another land-based 1,500 km (930 mi) range missile to attack targets across Line of Actual Control with an anti ship variant against aircraft carriers to cover Indian fleets in Bay of Bengal and Arabian Sea.

==== Development ====
On 5 November 2023, a report suggested that the Indian Armed Forces were considering the induction of a 1,500 km range-class conventional ballistic missile for the proposed Integrated Rocket Force. The design of the missile could be inherited from an existing ballistic missile of the Strategic Forces Command. As reported in April 2024, the missile was under development.

The DRDO introduced a full-scale model of the BM-04 ballistic missile at the Vigyan Vaibhav 2025 defence exhibition in Hyderabad in March. The missile design closely resembled Agni Prime missile with a 10.2 m (33 ft) length, 1.2 m (3 ft 11 in) diameter and weight of 11,500 kg (25,400 lb). The missile would be two staged solid propulsion with a range of 400–1,500 km (250–930 mi). The missile guided by IRNSS or GPS. The reentry vehicle of the missile was designed to be a boostglide vehicle with an expected terminal speed of over Mach 5 (1.7 km/s). The reentry vehicle featured fixed wings in the middle and control fins in the rear and is to be equipped with over 500 kg (1,100 lb) conventional warhead. The BM-04 will be tasked to "neutralise enemy anti-access/area denial (A2/AD) capabilities and ensure that the Indian defence forces do not face any operational restrictions in a highly contested battlefield".

== See also ==
- Agni Missile family
  - Agni-I
  - Agni-II
  - Agni-III
  - Agni-IV
  - Agni-V
- Long Range – Anti Ship Missile (India)
- List of missiles
