= Agni-II =

Indian medium-range ballistic missile

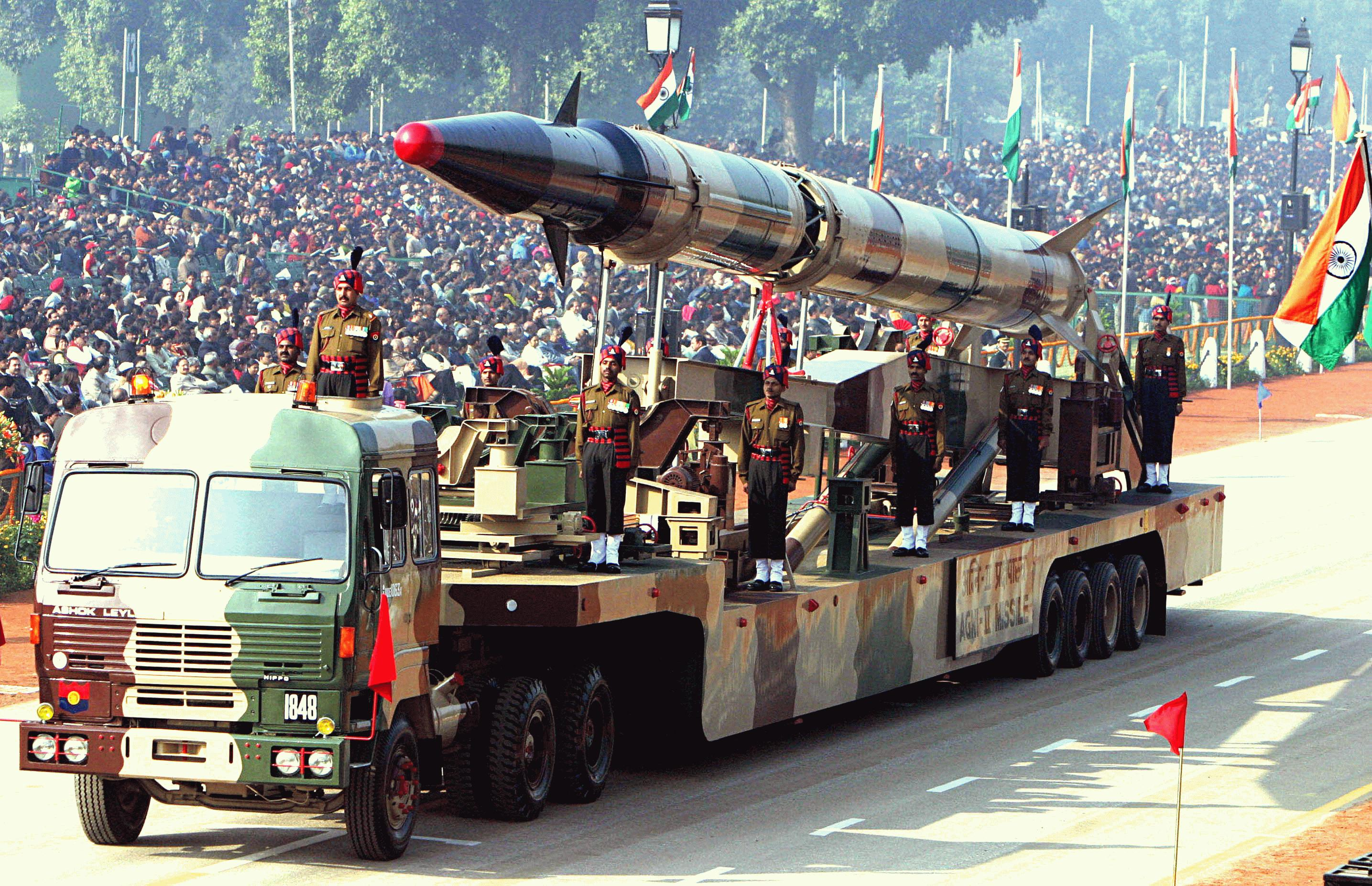
- An Agni-II on a road-mobile launcher displayed at the Republic Day Parade 2004.
- Type: Medium Range Ballistic Missile
- Place of origin: India

Service history
- In service: Active
- Used by: Strategic Forces Command

Production history
- Designer: Defence Research and Development Organisation
- Manufacturer: Bharat Dynamics Limited
- Unit cost: ₹25 crore (US$2.6 million) to ₹35 crore (US$3.6 million)
- No. built: 12 (2017 est.)

Specifications
- Mass: 16,000 kg (35,000 lb)
- Length: 21 m
- Diameter: 1.3 m
- Warhead: Conventional high explosive-unitary, penetration, sub-munitions, incendiary, thermobaric, strategic nuclear weapon
- Warhead weight: 1,000 kg (2,200 lb)
- Engine: Multi-stage solid rocket
- Propellant: Solid fuel
- Operational range: 2,000–3,500 km
- Flight ceiling: 405 km
- Flight altitude: 230 km
- Maximum speed: 3.5 km/s (14,040 km/h)
- Guidance system: Mid-course: RLG-INS + multi-GNSS; Terminal: Radar scene matching. Upgraded to ARH
- Accuracy: 30–40 m CEP
- Launch platform: Ashok Leyland/Tata transporter erector launcher

Agni-II (lit. 'Fire'), is the second strategic ballistic missile of the Agni family envisaged to be the mainstay of the Indian missile-based strategic nuclear deterrence. The Agni-II is a medium-range ballistic missile (MRBM) with two solid fuel stages and a Post Boost Vehicle (PBV) integrated into the missile's Re-entry Vehicle (RV). The Agni's manoeuvring RV is made of a carbon-carbon composite material that is light and able to sustain high thermal stresses of re-entry, in a variety of trajectories. The Agni-IIA is a more advanced version of Agni-II, albeit with more sophisticated and lighter materials, yielding a better range and operating regime. Agni-IIA was later renamed as Agni-IV plugging the gap between Agni-II and Agni-III. While the first test of Agni-IV in December 2010 was a failure, the second test flight in November 2011 was a success Agni-II, developed as part of medium- and long-range Agni series of missile systems, has already been inducted into the Armed Forces.

Agni missile range comparison.

On 17 May 2010, the trial was conducted with a Strategic Forces Command (SFC) of nuclear-capable Agni-II ballistic missile, with a range of 2,000 kilometres from the Wheelers Island off Orissa coast thus making Agni-II missile operational by army. US Air Force National Air and Space Intelligence Center estimating that as of June 2017 less than 10 launchers were operationally deployed, operated by the 335 Missile Group of Regiment of Artillery at Secunderabad using 12 TEL vehicles.

Agni-II can reach all of Pakistan and most parts of south and southeastern China.

== See also ==
- India and weapons of mass destruction

Related development

- Agni I
- Agni III
- Agni IV
- Agni V
- Agni-P
- Agni VI

Related lists

- List of nuclear weapons
- List of states with nuclear weapons
