= Agni (missile family) =

Indian ballistic missile

Agni-P, I, II, III, IV, V, VI
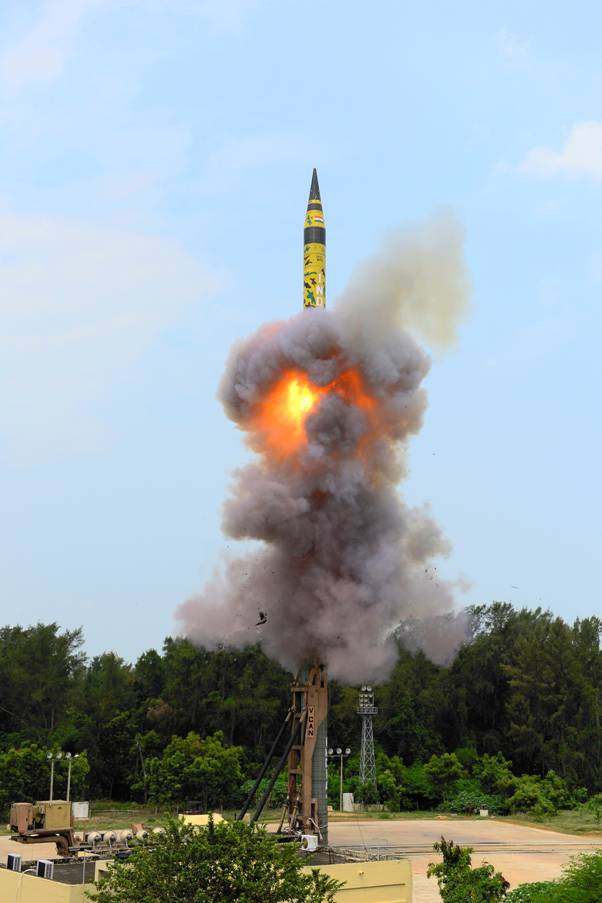
- Agni-V ICBM
- Type: Medium-range ballistic missile (Agni-I, Agni-II, Agni Prime); Intermediate-range ballistic missile (Agni-III, Agni-IV); Intercontinental ballistic missile (Agni-V, Agni VI)
- Place of origin: India

Service history
- In service: Active
- Used by: India

Production history
- Designer: Defence Research and Development Organisation
- Manufacturer: Bharat Dynamics Limited

Specifications
- Mass: 12,000 kg (Agni-I); 16,000 kg (Agni-II); 50,000 kg (Agni III); 17,000 kg (Agni-IV); 50,000 kg (Agni-V); 55,000 kg (Agni VI); 11,000 kg (Agni P)
- Length: 15 m (Agni-I); 21 m (Agni-II); 17 m (Agni-III); 20 m (Agni-IV); 17.5 m (Agni-V); 10.5 m(Agni-P)
- Diameter: 1.0 m (Agni-I, Agni-II); 1.2 m(Agni-IV); 2.0 m (Agni-III, Agni V); 1.1 m (Agni VI); 1.15 m (Agni P)
- Warhead: Conventional high explosive-unitary, penetration, cluster munitions, incendiary weapon, thermobaric, strategic nuclear weapon
- Engine: Composite rocket motor
- Propellant: Solid fuel
- Operational range: 700–1,200 km (Agni-I); 1,000–2,000 km (Agni Prime); 2,000–3,500 km (Agni-II); 3,000–5,000 km (Agni-III); 3,500–4,000 km (Agni-IV); 7,000–8,000 km (Agni-V); 11,000–12,000 km (Agni VI)
- Flight altitude: 300 km (Agni-I); 230 km (Agni-II), 350 km (Agni-III)
- Maximum speed: 24 Mach (Agni-V)
- Guidance system: Mid-course: Ring laser gyro inertial navigation system with GPS/NavIC satellite guidance Terminal: Imaging infrared homing, radar scene correlation, active radar homing
- Launch platform: Road/Rail mobile

The Agni missile (Sanskrit: अग्नि; lit. Fire) is a family of medium to intercontinental range ballistic missiles developed by India, named after one of the five elements of nature. Agni missiles are long-range, nuclear weapons capable, surface-to-surface ballistic missiles. The first missile of the series, Agni-I was developed under the Integrated Guided Missile Development Programme (lGMDP) and tested in 1989. After its success, the Agni missile programme was separated from the GMDP upon realizing its strategic importance. It was designated as a special programme in India's defence budget and provided adequate funds for subsequent development.

== Missile family ==
As of November 2019, the missiles in the Agni series are being inducted into service. The family comprises the following:

Name	Type	Range	Status
Agni-I	MRBM	700–1,200 km	Operational
Agni-II	MRBM	2,000–3,500 km	Operational
Agni-III	IRBM	3,000–5,000 km	Operational
Agni-IV	IRBM	3,500–4,000 km	Operational
Agni-V	ICBM	7,000–8,000 km	Operational
Agni-P	MRBM	1,000–2,000 km	Undergoing trials
Agni-VI	ICBM	11,000–12,000 km	Under development

== Agni-I ==
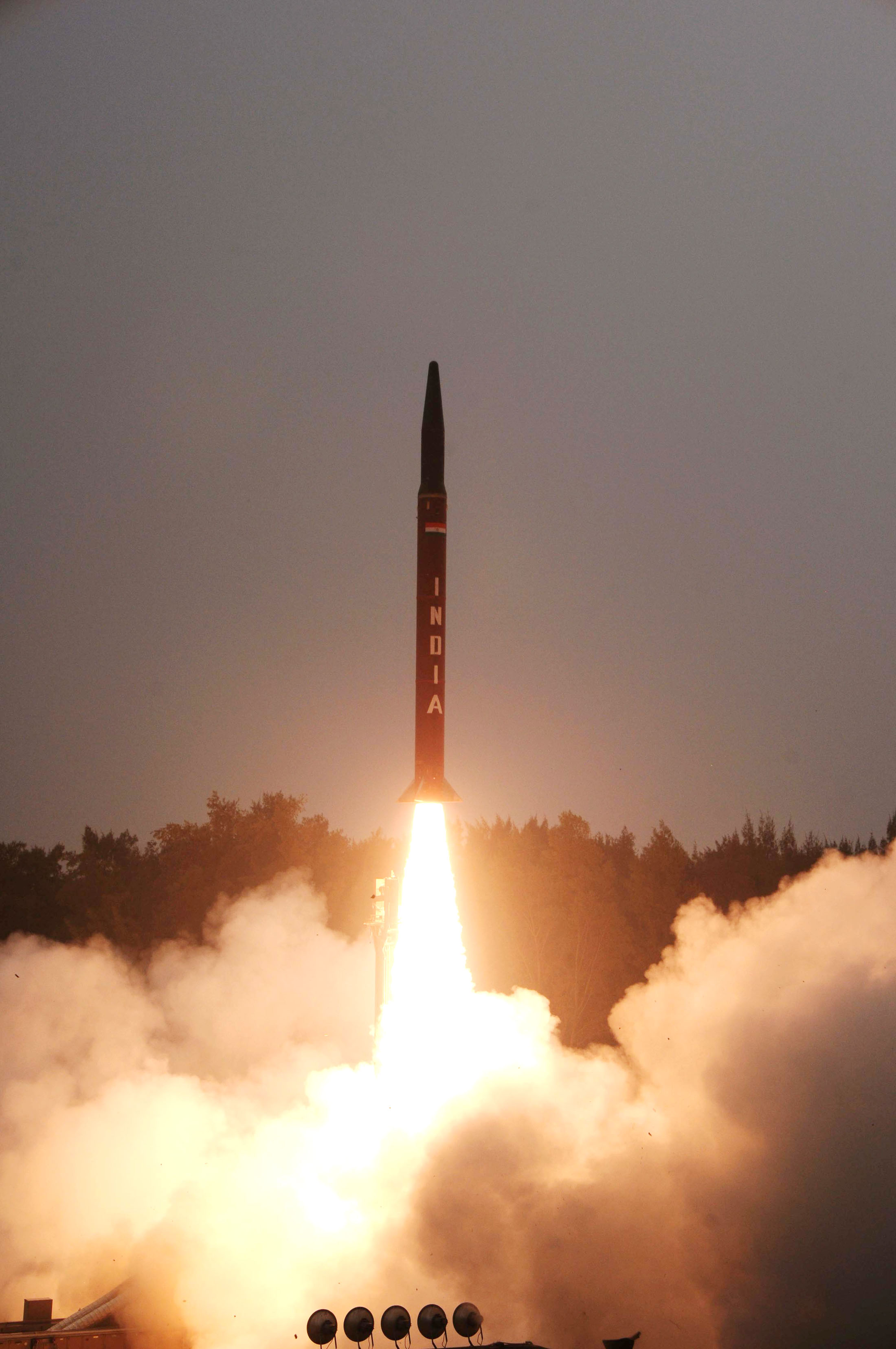
Agni-I

The two-stage Agni technology demonstrator, with a solid-fuel first stage, was first tested at the Interim Test Range in Chandipur in 1989. It was capable of carrying a conventional payload of 1,000 kg (2,200 lb) or a nuclear warhead. This original technology demonstrator evolved into the solid-fuel Agni-1 and Agni-2 missiles. India first developed the two-stage 2000 km range Agni-2, testing it in 1999. It then used the first stage of this system to develop the 700 km range single-stage Agni-1, which was first tested in January 2002

Weighing 12 tonne with a length of 15 metres, Agni-1 has a range of 700–900 km and is capable of carrying a conventional payload of 1,000 kg (2,200 lb) or a nuclear warhead at a speed of 2.5 km/s. Agni missiles consist of one (short range) or two stages (intermediate-range). These are rail and road mobile and powered by solid propellants. Agni-I is used by the Strategic Force Command (SFC) of the Indian Army. The latest missile test occurred on 13 July 2012, when India test-fired Agni I successfully at Abdul Kalam Island off Orissa coast. On 11 April 2014 the missile was test fired for the first time in a night trial exercise to its full range of 700 km from the Wheeler island off the Odisha coast. The missile randomly picked from the production line was test-fired by the Strategic Forces Command after 11 pm. This test was the first night after 2 previous tests failed due to technical glitches. The missile was test fired from a mobile launcher with logistics support from DRDO at the Integrated Test Range as part of the regular training exercise by the armed forces.

With a special weapons load Agni-I can reach 1200 km. As compared to Agni-II, Agni-I is less costly, simple, accurate, and more mobile.

== Agni-II ==
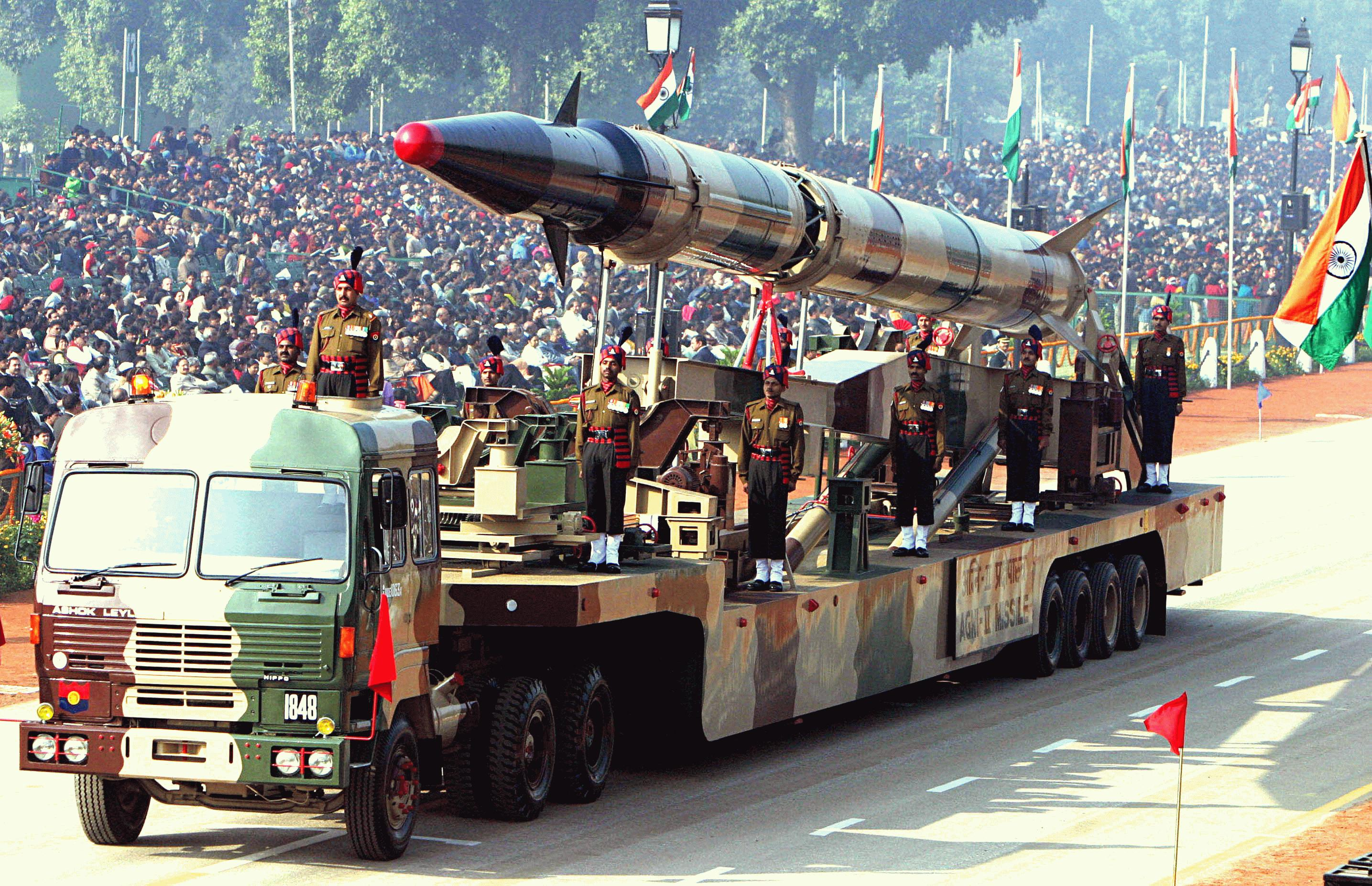
Agni-II

Agni-II with a range of 2,000–2,500 km is 20 metres long, has a diameter of one metre, and weighs around 18 tonnes. Agni–II uses solid propellant in both of its two stages. They are claimed to be a part of the "credible deterrence" against China and Pakistan. India stated that its nuclear and missile development programmes are not Pakistan-centric, that the Pakistani threat is only a marginal factor in New Delhi's security calculus, and that Agni is at the heart of deterrence in the larger context of Sino-Indian equation.

The 2000 km range nuclear weapon capable missile, already inducted into the country's arsenal, was successfully launched as a training exercise by the Strategic Forces Command on 9 August 2012. India on 7 April 2013 conducted the latest test of its nuclear-capable Agni-II strategic ballistic missile from a missile testing range in Odisha. The test was conducted from Abdul Kalam Island (formerly known as Wheeler Island) in Bhadrak district, by army personnel as part of a training exercise. India successfully conducted the first night trial of nuclear-capable intermediate-range ballistic missile Agni-II from the Abdul Kalam Island of the Odisha coast at 16 Nov 2019. The 20-metre-long, two-stage ballistic missile has a strike range of 2,000 km To 3000 km. It has a launch weight of 17 tonnes and can carry a payload of 1,000 kg. India is said to be able to build more than 18 Agni-II missiles every year.

== Agni-III ==
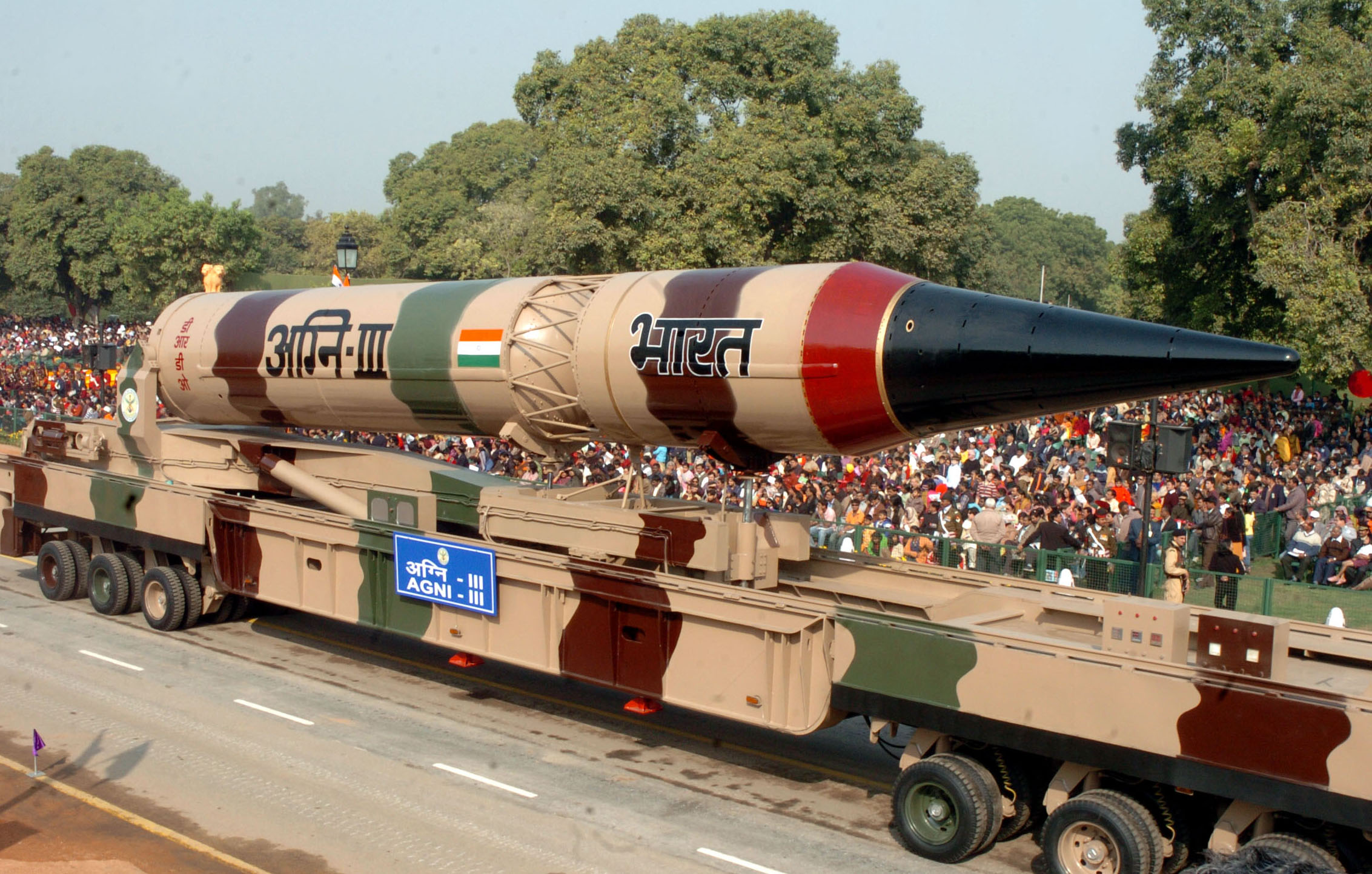
Agni-III

Agni-III is the third in the Agni series of missiles. Agni III uses solid propellant in both stages. Agni-III was first tested on 9 July 2006 from Wheeler Island off the coast of the eastern state of Odisha. After the launch, it was reported that the second stage of the rocket did not separate and the missile had fallen well short of its target. Agni-III was again tested on 12 April 2007, this time successfully, again from Wheeler Island. On 7 May 2008, India again successfully test-fired this missile. This was the third consecutive test; it validated the missile's operational readiness while extending the reach of India's nuclear deterrent to the most high-value targets of the nation's most likely adversaries. Agni-III has a range of 3,500 km, and can take a warhead of 1.5 tonnes.

It has been reported that the missile's circular error probable (CEP) lies in the range of 40 metres, This would make Agni-III the most accurate strategic ballistic missile of its range class in the world. This is of special significance because a highly accurate ballistic missile increases the "kill efficiency" of the weapon; it allows Indian weapons designers to use smaller yield nuclear warheads (200 kiloton thermonuclear or boosted fission) while increasing the lethality of the strike. This permits India to deploy a much larger nuclear force using less fissile/fusion material (plutonium/lithium deuteride) than other nuclear powers. Older ballistic missiles, such as those deployed by earlier nuclear powers required larger yield (1–2 megaton) warheads to achieve the same level of lethality. It has also been reported that with smaller payloads, the Agni-III can hit strategic targets well beyond 3,500 km.

== Agni-IV ==
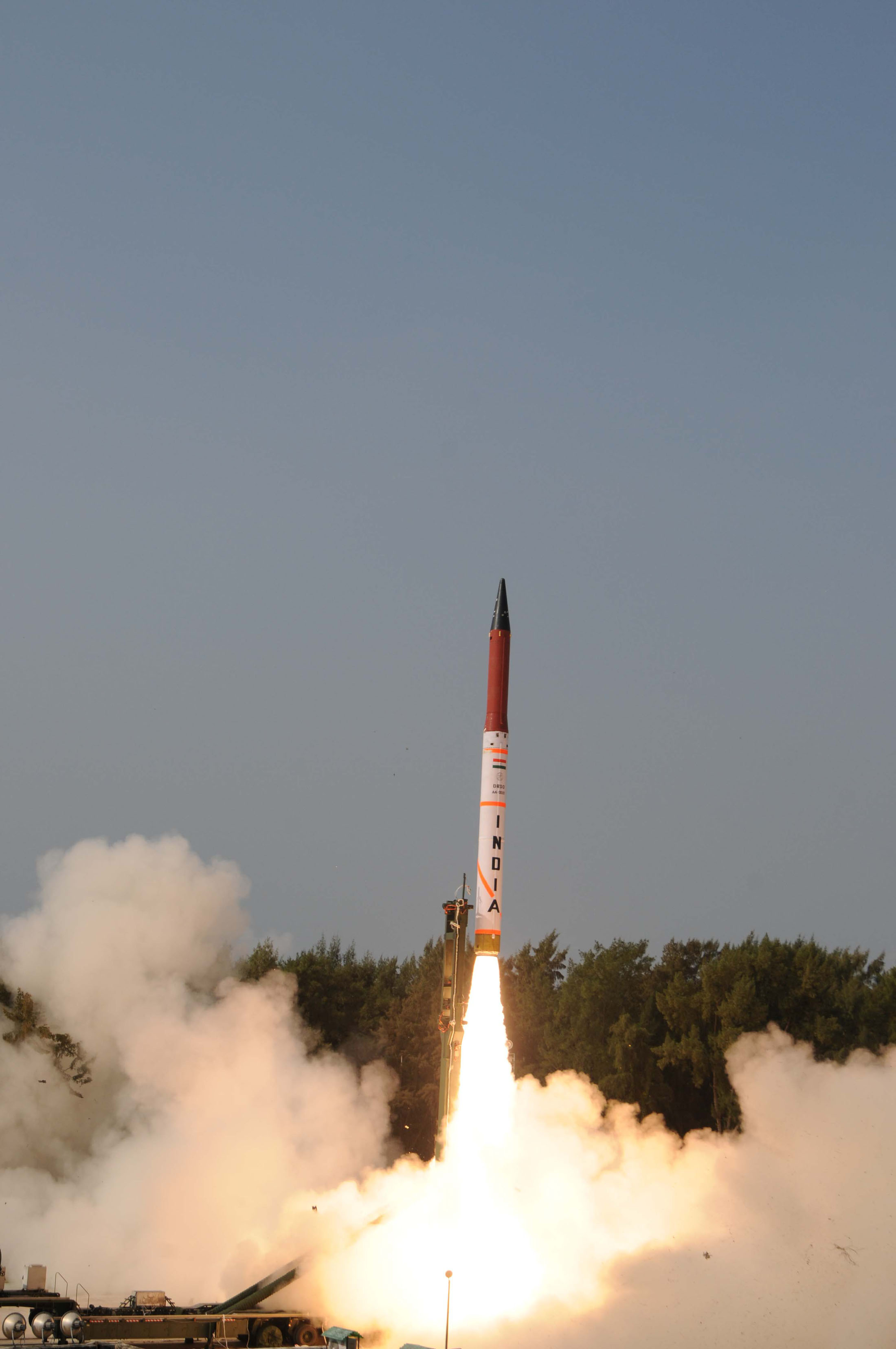
Agni-IV

Agni-IV is the fourth in the Agni series of missiles which was earlier known as Agni II prime. Agni-IV was first tested on 15 November 2011 and 19 September 2012 from Wheeler Island off the coast of the eastern state of Orissa for its full range of 4,000 km. The missile lifted off from a road-mobile launcher at 11.48 a.m. and after climbing to an altitude of over 800 km, it re-entered the atmosphere and impacted near the pre-designated target in the Indian Ocean with a remarkable degree of accuracy following a 20-minute flight. Carrying a payload of explosives weighing a tonne, the missile re-entered the atmosphere and withstood temperatures of more than 3,000 °C. With a range of 3,000–4,000 km, Agni-IV bridges the gap between Agni II and Agni III. It was again successfully test-fired on 20 January 2014. Agni IV can take a warhead of 1 tonne. It is designed to increase the kill efficiency along with a higher range performance. Agni IV is equipped with state-of-the-art technologies, that include indigenously developed ring laser gyro and composite rocket motor. It is a two-stage missile powered by solid propellant. Its length is 20 metres and its launch weight is 17 tonnes. It can be fired from a road-mobile launcher.

== Agni-V ==
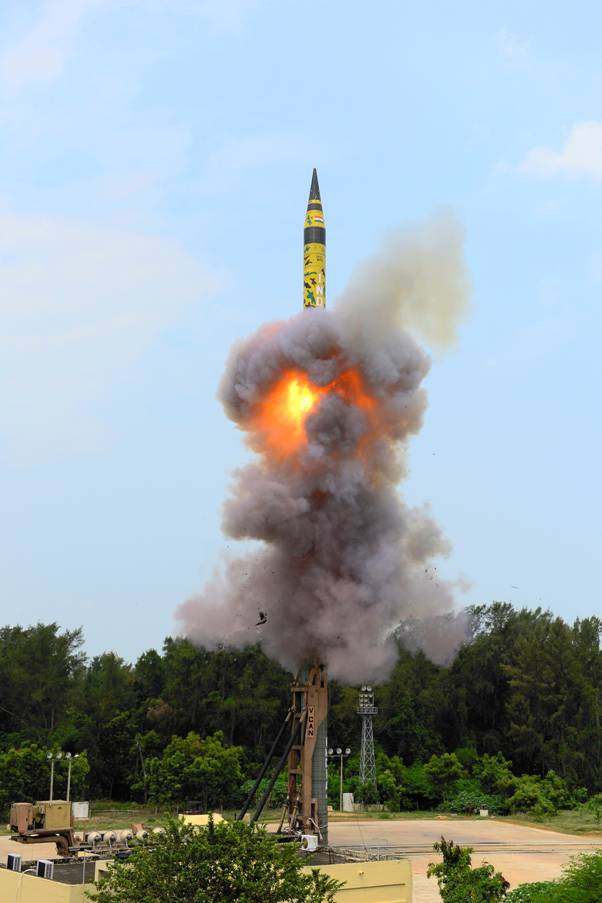
Agni-V

Agni-V is a solid fueled intercontinental ballistic missile (ICBM) developed by Defence Research and Development Organisation (DRDO) of India. It will greatly expand India's reach to strike targets more than 7,000 km away. Agni-V was first test fired on 19 April 2012 at 08:07 am IST from Abdul Kalam Island off the coast of Orissa, the test was successful. The second test launch of Agni-V was successfully done on 15 September 2013 at 08:43 am IST from Abdul Kalam Island (formerly known as the Wheeler Island). In January 2015, the canisterized version was successfully tested from Wheeler Island.

== Agni-P ==
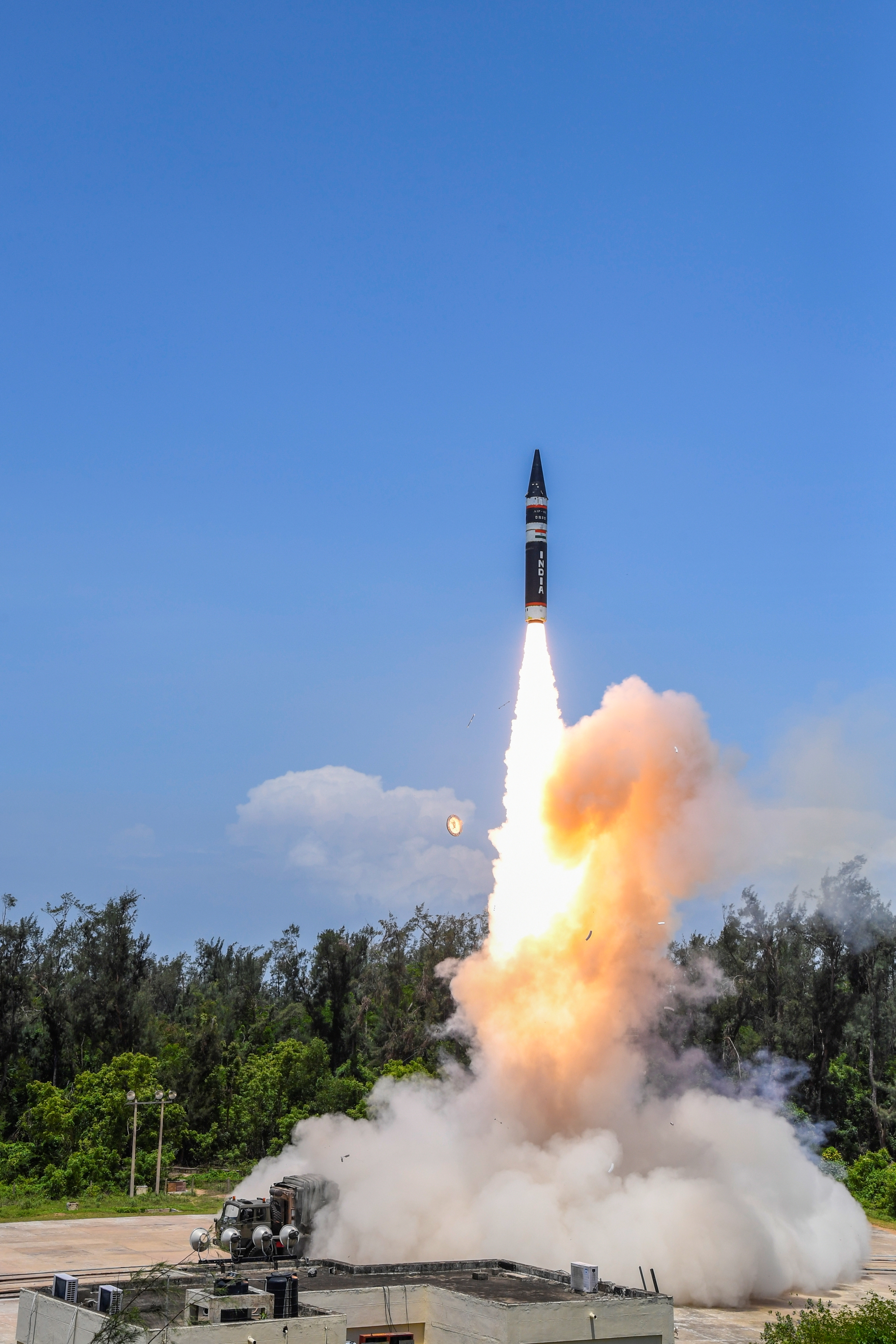
First flight test of Agni-1P from APJ Abdul Kalam Island.

It is a medium-range ballistic missile under development that incorporates technological advances from Agni-IV and Agni-V projects. Although it looks similar to Agni-III the weight is reduced by half. Agni-P will replace the older generation missile such as Prithvi, Agni-I and Agni-II.

== Agni-VI ==
Agni-VI is an intercontinental ballistic missile reported to be in the early stages of development by India and is being developed by the Defence Research and Development Organisation. It is to be the latest and most advanced version of the Agni missile programme. It will be capable of being launched from submarines as well as from land, and will have a strike range of 8,000–10,000 km with MIRVed warheads.

== Further developments ==
Agni missile range

In May 2008, Indian scientists announced they had developed and patented a path-breaking technology that increases the range of missiles and satellite launch vehicles by at least 40%. The enhanced range is made possible by adding a special-purpose coating of chromium-based material to a rocket's blunt nose cone. The material acts as a reactive-ablative coating that forms a thin low-density gaseous layer at the tip of the rocket as it approaches hypersonic speeds; this super-heated gas layer reduces drag by 47% (at mach 7–8), thereby allowing range enhancements at least 40%. It has been announced that this technology will be incorporated in future Agni deployments after having undergone ranging and calibration tests.

== Specifications ==
Missile	Project	Type	Warhead	Payload (kg)	Range (km)	Dimension (m)	Fuel/Stages	Weight (kg)	In service	CEP (m)
Agni-I	IGMDP	Strategic	Conventional high explosive-unitary, penetration, cluster munition, incendiary, thermobaric, strategic nuclear weapon	1,000	700–1200	15X1	Single stage solid	22,000	2009	25
Agni-II	IGMDP	Strategic	Conventional high explosive-unitary, penetration, sub-munitions, incendiary, thermobaric, strategic nuclear weapon	820–2,000	2,000–3,500	20X1	Two and half stage solid	26,000	2006	30-40
Agni-III	IGMDP	Strategic	Conventional, thermobaric, strategic nuclear weapon	2,500	3,000–5,000	17X2	Two stage solid	50,000	2011	40
Agni-IV	Agni-IV development programme	Strategic	Conventional, thermobaric, strategic nuclear weapon	800–1,000	3,500–4,000	20X1.2	Two stage solid	17,000	2014	10
Agni-V	Agni-V development programme	Strategic	Strategic nuclear weapon	1,500 (6-10 MIRV)	7,000–8,000	17X2	Three Stage solid	50,000	2019	>10 - <80
Agni-P	Agni-1 Prime	Strategic	Conventional, thermobaric, strategic nuclear weapon	Unknown	1,000–2,000	Unknown	Two stage solid	Unknown	In trial	10
Agni-VI	Agni-VI development programme	Strategic	Strategic nuclear weapon	3,000 (10 MIRV)	11,000-12,000	40X1.1	Four Stage solid	55,000	Under development	

== See also ==
- K missiles
- India and weapons of mass destruction
- List of states with nuclear weapons
