= Mission Sudarshan Chakra =

Multi-layer defense system

- Type: Multi-layer defense Multi-domain operation
- Place of origin: India

Service history
- In service: Indian Armed Forces (intended)

Production history
- Designer: Defence Research and Development Organisation
- Designed: 2025 (in development)
- Produced: Phase-1: 2030 (planned); Phase-2: 2035 (planned)

Specifications
- Operational range: South Asia; Parts of: China; Iran; Central Asia; Middle East; Southeast Asia
- Launch platform: Ground-based, sea-based, satellites

Mission Sudarshan Chakra is an Indian defence initiative to develop an interlocked, multi-layered, all-encompassing, AI-enabled networked architecture that combines enhanced monitoring, cyber protection, and physical defense to protect Indian population and infrastructure against terrorist attacks, military strikes, and other high value threats. The idea behind the defense barrier is similar to the Iron Dome of Israel and the Golden Dome of the United States. The Defence Research and Development Organisation is the main entity spearheading the project.

The programme's goal is to establish a national multi-domain offensive and defensive security umbrella. It is to facilitate quick, accurate, and effective defense response against multi-vector threats such as ballistic missiles, hypersonic platforms, fighter aircraft, loitering munitions, swarm drones etc.

== History ==
The Prime Minister of India, Narendra Modi, unveiled Mission Sudarshan Chakra from Red Fort on August 15, 2025 during his Independence Day speech. The Sudarshan Chakra architecture will be expanded by 2035, and the programme will involve strengthening and modernizing existing defence system in the Indian military arsenal. The name was inspired by Krishna's divine weapon, Sudarshana Chakra. Under the Atmanirbhar Bharat policy, the research and development of the entire system architecture and manufacturing of the components will be done in India. Sudarshan Chakra will have the ability to execute precise counterstrikes, and incorporate anti-cyber warfare capabilities. In cooperation with the Indian military and private sector businesses, Mission Sudarshan Chakra will entail cooperation between defense research organizations and civilian research laboratories.

The Chinese cyber attacks after 2020–2021 China–India skirmishes, 2025 Pahalgam attack, 2025 India–Pakistan conflict, drone and missile attacks targeting the Golden Temple, nuclear threat from Chief of the Army Staff of Pakistan General Asim Munir on Indian civilian infrastructure, and announcement of Army Rocket Force by Prime Minister of Pakistan Shehbaz Sharif, demonstrated the necessity for a complete defense system for India's national security. Extensive coastline and hostile neighbors necessitated concurrent protection and surveillance. India's expanding economy raised the threats on financial hotspots, technology hubs, and industrial corridors. Mission Sudarshan Chakra became a vital tool for the survival of the country as a result of the confluence of security threats.

It was held that critical military and civilian institutions, such as communications networks, food and water supplies, railway platforms, hospitals, religious sites, defense systems, and electrical grids, that are high priority targets for enemy forces needed to have their own layers of strong military and technological protection. The Integrated Air Command and Control System and its own multi-layered air defense systems, Trigun system and the Akashteer network, will be interlocked with the Sudarshan Chakra architecture. As of 2025, the fundamental components of Mission Sudarshan Chakra have already been determined. The evolving nature of warfare will inform the design of the entire system architecture.

According to General Anil Chauhan, Chief of Defence Staff, multi-domain intelligence, surveillance, reconnaissance, and the integration of sensors placed on land, in the air, on ships, underwater, and in space will be necessary. The project will involve building infrastructure and procedures for the detection, acquisition, and neutralization of the enemy's weaponry. To get a clear picture and provide real-time responses, massive amounts of big data will need to be analyzed using artificial intelligence, large language models and quantum computing.

On 28 November 2025, Defense Secretary, Rajesh Kumar Singh, announced that MSC groundwork had begun. A combination of Make in India, imports, and IDDM (Indigenously Designed, Developed, and Manufactured) initiatives will be used to carry out the project. A comprehensive project study and feasibility plan will be prepared by a team under DRDO and Air Marshal Ashutosh Dixit. Defence capital expenditures will be used to finance the entire project. Integrated air defense systems and counter-UAS grids are being developed by the Indian military.

By 30 April 2026, as per the defence secretary, the team under the DRDO chairman had already submitted its "pre-feasibility" report.

== Objective ==
The Ministry of Defense states that Mission Sudarshan Chakra programme has three main specific goals:

- Making sure that all subsystems are completely researched, developed, and produced in India.
- Using predictive and modern technologies to foresee future warfare scenarios.
- Creating accurate targeted systems that can quickly retaliate against adversaries.

The mission's broader goal is to create a complete national security shield by 2035 that protects civilian and strategic assets, including public areas.

== System ==
Sudarshan Chakra will safeguard all vital national locations and guarantee complete protection against an evolving multi-dimensional threats. With its threat detection and targeting system, it will be able to stop enemy aggression and launch potent reprisal strikes. It will aid in quickly eliminating threats on land, in the air, at sea, and facilitate the safe return of Indian military assets. It will examine sabotage of strategic assets, hybrid threats, and cyberwarfare. Mission Sudarshan Chakra is an effort to develop a next-generation integrated surveillance and strike platform.

Sudarshan Chakra will interlink with the integrated rocket force via. IACCS network. The fundamental objective is to function as a single operational unit without delay by seamlessly integrating India's air defense network and missile strike force. Long-range precision weapons like ballistic and hypersonic missiles as well as soft/hard kill alternatives like microwave and directed-energy weapons would be used by Sudarshan Chakra to deliver counterattacks. The IRF's offensive strike capabilities and the IACCS's defensive surveillance will work in real time to carry out multiple precise retaliatory attacks, organize multi-layered air defense, and proactive threat identification.

Drones, lasers, artificial intelligence, and other contemporary military technologies will be the part of Sudarshan Chakra architecture. The AI will develop counter strategies by performing permutations and combinations of multiple possibilities and military maneuvers to estimate the likelihood of future conflicts. Entire India, including island territories, will be monitored by sensor layer, which will also cover at least 2,500 kilometres (1,600 mi) past the international border.

With AI playing a key role, it will have a nationwide network of radars, command-and-control centers, interceptor missiles, close range and long range counter unmanned air systems that can identify, track, and destroy incoming missiles, drones, artillery shells, and swarms or loitering munitions in real time. Up to about 500 km, the system will detect and destroy drones and medium- and short-range missiles. There will be a rapid-response defense element in place to counter short-range aerial threats. In order to facilitate retaliation, it will track the sources of drone or missile launches. With Sudarshan Chakra, the Army, Air Force, and Navy will combine their air defense capabilities.

It will include space-based tracking, automated command and control, land-based and sea-based weapon batteries, and an overlapping network of tracking and early-warning sensors. Mission Sudarshan Chakra is tied to Project Kusha's ongoing development. It also signifies the operational readiness of the Indian Ballistic Missile Defence Programme. Sudarshan Chakra will help in real-time coordination between security forces, intelligence agencies, and research institutions using predictive monitoring driven by AI and an integrated threat response network. It could involve upgrading the national air space management capability. Using hypersonic interceptors, the initial phase will have an interception range of up to 2,500 kilometres (1,600 mi) and an altitude coverage of up to 150 kilometres (93 mi).

== Subsystems ==
=== Raksha Kavach ===
In January 2025, the DRDO presented the Raksha Kavach multi-layer defense system against threats from multiple domains. Its components include the following: VSHORAD, Dharashakti electronic warfare system, Arudhra medium power radar, Advanced Light-Weight Torpedo, QRSAM, DRDO AEW&CS, ATAGS, D-4 System, Space Based Surveillance, UAVs, VHF/UHF man-portable software-defined radio, satellite phone, and Ugram assault rifle.

The Space Based Surveillance will identify possible threats in real time in the first layer. The command and control center will then receive alerts which will notify the DRDO AEW&CS for second-layer surveillance. Land based radar in the third layer will use the combined intelligence to scan the area for the incoming threat and transmit signals back to the command center. By eliminating threats that enters the surveillance zone, the control center establishes a protected area. In order to intercept threats, it will automatically guide the missile launchers. Three layers of protection are also included in the protected zone. Surface-to-air missiles will be used to destroy the airborne threats. The EW based soft-kill method will be used for jamming and damaging enemy targets.

=== Integrated Air Defence Weapon System ===
On 23 August 2025, DRDO conducted the first flight tests of the Integrated Air Defence Weapon System (IADWS) at 12:30 pm IST from the Integrated Test Range. The IADWS included the QRSAM, Advanced VSHORAD, and a 5 kW laser-based DEW. Two high-speed fixed wing UAVs and a multicopter drone were engaged and destroyed simultaneously at varying distances and altitudes. The Centralised Command and Control System which guided the IADWS has been developed by the Defence Research and Development Laboratory, the nodal laboratory of the programme. Meanwhile, the VSHORADS and DEW was developed by Research Centre Imarat and Centre for High Energy Systems and Sciences, respectively. Captured data from ITR's range instruments confirmed that all system components—radars, command and control, communication, drone identification and destruction system, and missiles—performed in unison for multi-layered area defense.

The Centralised Command and Control Centre (C2C2) integrates the radar and electro-optical sensor streams in order to generate the real-time awareness. The C2C2 assigns each conventional and asymmetric threat to an appropriate interceptor, kinetic interceptors or DEWs , based on factors like flight route, radar cross-section, altitude, and velocity. The QRSAM, VSHORAD and DEW forms the different tiers of the system, starting from the outermost ones to the lowermost layer. Forward air bases, radar and missile sites, nuclear facilities, space installations, power plants, and industrial centres, will be protected by the IADWS. The system is scalable and adaptable in order to defend against drone-based, hypersonic, and nuclear threats. IADWS is also meant to perform air surveillance, battle management, and weapons control as well as interception of precision-guided munitions, cruise missiles, UAVs as well as fighter aircraft. It will be merged with Akashteer and IACCS.

The Chief of Defence Staff, General Anil Chauhan, confirmed in the Ran Samwad 2025 on 26 August that the IADWS is a part of Mission Sudarshan Chakra.

As per reports on 9 December 2025, the system is poised to be deployed to protect the Delhi National Capital Region. It takes the place of the previous proposal to implement NASAMS 2, whose excessive cost caused negotiations between the US and India to fail. The Indian Air Force will operate it and be responsible for safeguarding important sites. In order to create the networking and command and control framework needed for IADWS, DRDO will collaborate closely with production partners.

=== Truck-mounted AK-630 ===
According to reports on 4 October 2025, Advanced Weapons and Equipment India received a request for proposal from the Corps of Army Air Defense. The goal of the tender is to acquire six mobile, high-rate-fire 30mm AK-630 close-in weapon system for Mission Sudarshan Chakra. The weapons, which are intended for deployment along the India–Pakistan border and Line of Control, will be utilised against the URAM domains — UAV, rockets, artillery, and mortars. Similar to C-RAM, the system passed Army internal testing in May 2025. The gun can fire 3,000 rounds per minute and has a 4 km (2.5 mi) range. An all-weather electro-optical fire control system is used to detect and engage targets.

=== Radars and satellites ===
Mission Sudarshan Chakra will integrate space assets and directed-energy weapons, with more than 6,000 to 7,000 radars, to identify hostile targets beyond the horizon. The space assets, including satellites from the Space Based Surveillance (SBS) project, will be linked to radars and air defense systems to monitor and scan enemy aircraft, drones, or missiles and to trigger weapon systems for interception. The integrated network will be supported by both newly developed and existing defensive systems and surveillance platforms. A number of radar systems, including over-the-horizon radars, will be acquired and integrated. The development of a multilayered shield will address airborne threats at both the strategic and tactical levels.

DRDO is developing an L-band active electronically scanned array radar to detect hypersonic missiles by overcoming the plasma stealth under Mission Sudarshan Chakra. The radar will be equipped with gallium nitride-based transmitter-receiver module (TRM) to provide high output power, and energy efficiency. The L-band is to use the longer wavelengths that can penetrate more effectively through the plasma stealth during hypersonic flight compare to X- or S-band frequencies. The use of AI/ML based signal processing is to allow for changing scanning parameters in real time, such as frequency, pulse shape and surveillance methods, to search for vulnerabilities. It is expected to use space-time adaptive processing algorithms to filter out interference from the missile’s ionized trail to identify the metal core.

=== Joint CUAS grid ===
In order to unify anti-drone capabilities across all three services, the Indian Armed Forces is working on a combined Counter Unmanned Aerial Systems grid. The planned CUAS grid will operate independently of current air defense networks like IACCS, which would be overloaded if it had to track small drones in addition to traditional aerial threats. Rather, the new grid will function as a permanent, specialized counter-drone network and be connected to the Army, Navy, and Air Force's Joint Air Defence Centers (JADCs). The grid will incorporate the numerous counter-drone equipment that the Indian Armed Forces have acquired since 2020, allowing for real-time monitoring and quicker reactions to low-altitude and unmanned aerial threats.

== Planning and deployment ==
Mission Sudarshan Chakra will be implemented in two stages between 2030 and 2035. Defence Minister Rajnath Singh announced at the Combined Commanders' Conference in Kolkata on September 16, 2025, that a committee has been established to review the project and will create a workable action plan with a medium-term plan through 2030 and a long-term plan through 2035.

Prior to the committee's creation, the defense minister had already received a presentation on Mission Sudarshan Chakra. Officials from the government have stated that Mission Sudarshan Chakra will safeguard nuclear power reactors and the Indian Space Research Organisation. The most important areas will be given priority by the phased approach.

According to Air Chief Marshal Amar Preet Singh, Mission Sudarshan Chakra would be a dynamic, integrated ecosystem that will seamlessly combine next-generation indigenous weapons under development, like Project Kusha, with already-inducted military assets, such as S-400. In order to improve the operational readiness, the Indian Air Force intends to fully deploy Phase-1 by 2028–2029.

In order to defend economic and strategic assets as well as civilian infrastructure against multi-domain threats under Mission Sudarshan Chakra, the Defence Forces Vision 2047 paper, which was unveiled on March 12, 2026, called for the expansion of ballistic missile defense and air defense systems.

== International collaboration ==
In a media briefing on August 20, 2025, Russian chargé d'affaires to India, Roman Babushkin, discussed Russia's readiness to support Mission Sudarshan Chakra.

== Assessment ==
To be fully implemented throughout India's major population centers, Mission Sudarshan Chakra will need an estimated ₹130,000 crore (US$14 billion) to ₹170,000 crore (US$18 billion) in initial expenditure and around ₹25,000 crore (US$3 billion) in running costs annually. In contrast to the Indian Armed Forces' current air defense system, a national shield would need more extensive coverage. According to retired Indian military personnel, given the substantial budgetary load associated with the implementation of Mission Sudarshan Chakra, strategic moderation and targeted conventional force development are potential alternatives.

== See also ==
- Integrated Air Command and Control System - command & control (Indian Air Force)
- Trigun system - command & control (Indian Navy)
- Akashteer - air defence control & reporting system (Indian Army)
- SAKSHAM - command & control (Indian Army)
- Defence Space Agency - Indian military space warfare unit
- Indian Ballistic Missile Defence Programme
- Project Kusha

Other nations

- Golden Dome - proposed multi-layer defense system for the United States
- Strategic Defense Initiative - U.S. military defense program (1984–1993)
- Iron Dome - Israeli air defense system
- Steel Dome - Turkish multi-layered air defense system

General concepts

- Militarisation of space
- Outer Space Treaty
