= Anant Shastra =

Indian surface-to-air missile

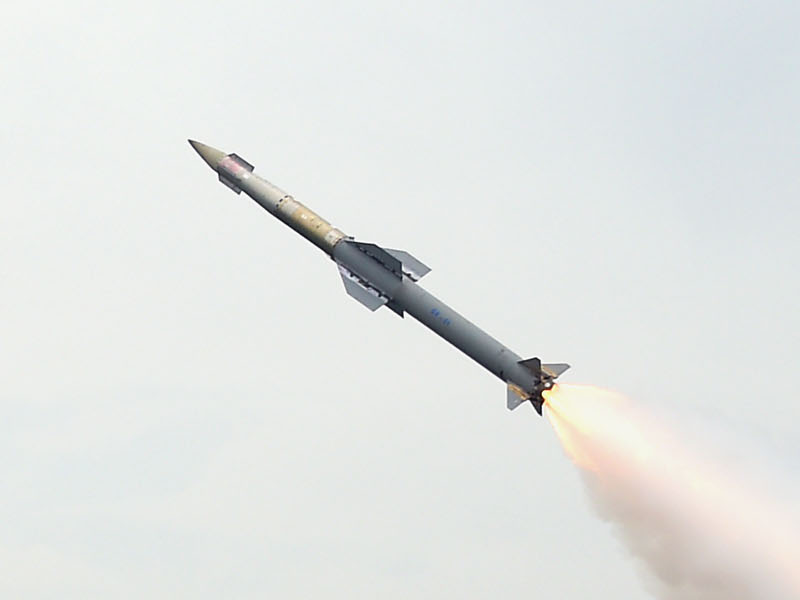
- Anant Shastra during its second flight test
- Type: Surface-to-air missile
- Place of origin: India

Service history
- Used by: Indian Army

Production history
- Designer: Defence Research and Development Organisation
- Manufacturer: Bharat Electronics; Bharat Dynamics Limited
- Produced: 2023 – present

Specifications
- Mass: 270 kg (600 lb)
- Length: 4.4 m (14 ft)
- Diameter: 0.22 m (0.72 ft)
- Warhead: HMX/TNT, pre-fragmented
- Warhead weight: 32 kg (71 lb)
- Detonation mechanism: Optical proximity fuze
- Engine: Single stage rocket motor
- Propellant: Solid fuel
- Operational range: 30–40 km (19–25 mi)
- Flight altitude: 6–14 km (20,000–46,000 ft)
- Maximum speed: Mach 3
- Guidance system: Mid-course: INS + two-way datalink Terminal: ARH
- Accuracy: 80% (single fire); simultaneous engagement: 6 targets; 100% (dual fire)
- Launch platform: 6 tube launcher mounted on 8 x 8 Ashok Leyland or Tata Motors Transporter Erector Launcher (TEL)

The Anant Shastra, also known as Quick Reaction Surface-to-Air Missile (QRSAM), is a surface-to-air missile defense system developed by the Defence Research and Development Organisation, Bharat Electronics Limited, and Bharat Dynamics Limited for the Indian Army, meant for protecting moving armoured columns from aerial attacks. The system also forms a part of the Integrated Air Defence Weapon System (IADWS).

The Command and Control System is completely automated. In addition to the launcher, the missile system has two four-walled radars that provide 360-degree coverage: the Active Array Battery Surveillance Radar and the Active Array Battery Multi-function Radar. An optical proximity fuze lessens the vulnerability to jamming.

== History ==
As a part of a replacement program for its obsolete 9K33M2 "Osa-AK" and 2K12E Kvadrat missile systems, Indian Army received a go-ahead to initiate a global acquisition program for quick-reaction surface-to-air missiles from the Ministry of Defence in September 2007. The acquisition program faced multiple issues, including poor response from vendors and re-tendering to avoid single source acquisition. In the meanwhile, a DRDO project to develop quick-reaction surface-to-air missiles was sanctioned in July 2014 with a budget of ₹476.43 crore (equivalent to ₹761 crore or US$79 million in 2023). The missile was developed in association with Bharat Electronics Limited and Bharat Dynamics Limited with both firms participating in development and manufacturing. In 2017, Indian Army's global acquisition program was dropped in favour of the locally developed QRSAM.

The operational version meanwhile is awaiting production in mid-2021 after user trials. According to reports, the MoD is in the midst of deploying a multi-layered air defense network dubbed Capital Dome, which will include VL-SRSAM and Anant Shastra to defend the National Capital Region against missiles and drones.

== Description ==
Anant Shastra is a compact and highly mobile air defence system mounted on Ashok Leyland Defence Systems 8x8 truck, designed to provide 360 degree defence coverage. The transporter erector launcher (TEL) of the system is developed by Larsen & Toubro, while missiles are manufactured by Bharat Dynamics Limited. Each launcher has 6 missiles and can target 6 different targets. The Anant Shastra has electronic counter-countermeasure capabilities to remain immune to jamming. The single-staged missile utilized by the system is propelled using solid propellants. The missile is equipped with a mid-course inertial navigation system with a two-way data link and a DRDO-developed terminal active radar seeker. It is an improved active Ku, X band monopulse radio-frequency (RF) seeker developed by Research Center Imarat.

The missile has an optical proximity fuze developed by Instruments Research and Development Establishment, to increase accuracy and reduces its susceptibility to jamming. The system has the capability to search and track targets while moving.

As part of the Army's Air Defence, the Anant Shastra is built to move with offensive formations while maintaining search and track capabilities and the capacity to fire at a short notice.

Its command and control system, target acquisition and fire control are fully automated. The surveillance and fire control radars developed by Bharat Electronics Limited, namely, the Active Array Battery Surveillance Radar (BSR) and the Active Array Battery Multifunction Radar (BMFR) are four walled, configured to provide 360 degree coverage, integrated with identification friend or foe for multiple target engagement. Both the radars have Quad Transmit Receive Modules (QTRMs). The BSR operates in C-band with a range of 120 km (75 mi) while the BMFR operates in X-band with a range of 80 km (50 mi). The Anant Shastra has a maximum range of 30 km (19 mi) and can intercept targets flying at 10 km (6.2 mi) altitude. According to DRDO, currently the Anant Shastra has 90% indigenous component, which is projected to increase 99% incrementally. It has been interfaced with the Akashteer.

An Anant Shastra Weapon System consists of one Regiment Command Post Vehicle (RCPV) which is connected to three battery units. Each battery includes a Battery Surveillance Radar Vehicle (BSRV) and a Battery Command Post Vehicle (BCPV). Additionally, four combat groups (CGs) makes up a single battery unit. A CG consists of a multi-purpose radar unit with ten target engagement capabilities and a missile-launcher vehicle armed with six QRSAM missile canisters. An Anant Shastra Weapon System consists of 72 missiles and a logistic truck.

== Testing ==
QRSAM test with live warhead on 17 November 2020.

=== Developmental trials ===
- The first test firing of the missile took place on 4 June 2017. This was followed by the second successful test on 3 July 2017. The test was conducted from Chandipur, Odisha. Around 100 scientists are working as part of the missile development program led by Defence Research and Development Laboratory. DRDO's other labs including Research Centre Imarat, Research & Development Establishment (Engineers), and Integrated Test Range are also contributing to the missile development effort.
- On 22 December, the missile was test fired for the third time. The test was reported to be a success.
- The fourth test took place on 8 October 2018 and was reported to be successful.
- Fifth test was successfully performed on 26 February 2019.
- The sixth test was conducted on 4 August 2019 at 11:05 am from a mobile truck-based launcher at the launch complex-3 of the ITR at Chandipur.
- The seventh-test took place on 23 December 2019 from Abdul Kalam Island, which included two firings of the missile. With this test, the development of the missile was declared complete.

=== User trials ===
- On 13 November 2020, DRDO successfully conducted test fire of the system and achieved a major milestone by a direct hit on to a Banshee pilot-less target aircraft at medium range and medium altitude.
- On 17 November 2020, DRDO successfully test-fired QRSAM with live warhead for the first time to check performance parameter of various subsystem. The integrated radar did tracking and target acquisition while mission computer managed automatic launch sequence. Upon missile launch, two way datalink was successfully established and helped activate radar homing guidance at terminal phase. Warhead activation and detonation was achieved when the target was close enough for destruction. The missile managed to hit and bring down an unmanned target vehicle at medium range and altitude.
- Six flight tests were completed on 8 September 2022 off the Odisha coast, where QRSAM managed to intercept high speed maneuvering aerial targets with pin point accuracy under long-range medium altitude and short-range high altitude conditions in quick succession salvo firing. The tests were carried out in final deployment configuration with all indigenously developed subsystems including missile with radio-frequency seeker, mobile launcher, automated command and control system, surveillance and multi-function radars.

=== IADWS Trials ===
- The first Integrated Air Defence Weapon System (IADWS) test was conducted by the DRDO on 23 August 2025 at around 12:30 pm IST, using QRSAM, Advanced VSHORAD, and a high-power laser-based DEW. Two high-speed fixed wing UAVs and a multicopter drone were engaged and destroyed simultaneously at varying distances and altitudes. The Centralised Command and Control System which guided the IADWS has been developed by the Defence Research and Development Laboratory, the nodal laboratory of the programme. Meanwhile, the VSHORADS and DEW was developed by Research Centre Imarat, and Centre for High Energy Systems and Sciences, respectively.

== Order status ==
On 28 May 2024, it was reported that an order for QRSAM worth about ₹30,000 crore (US$3.1 billion) is to be signed with Bharat Electronics in the following fiscal year. As per officials, the Corps of Army Air Defense's modernisation strategy called for the placement of QRSAM order. As of early June 2025, it was anticipated that the Defence Acquisition Council under the Ministry of Defence would authorize the purchase of three QRSAM regiments. The capital acquisition proposal was approved on 3 July 2025 by DAC, under the Acceptance of Necessity (AoN) route for the Army Air Defence. A tender for the purchase of Anant Shastra air defence system, earlier known as QRSAM, was issued by the Indian Army to Bharat Electronics on 27 September 2025.

On April 8, 2026, BEL committed more than ₹562 crore to the Uttar Pradesh Defence Industrial Corridor, allocating 75 hectares of land in Chitrakoot for the production of QRSAM.

== Operators ==
India

- Indian Army
- Indian Airforce

== Gallery ==
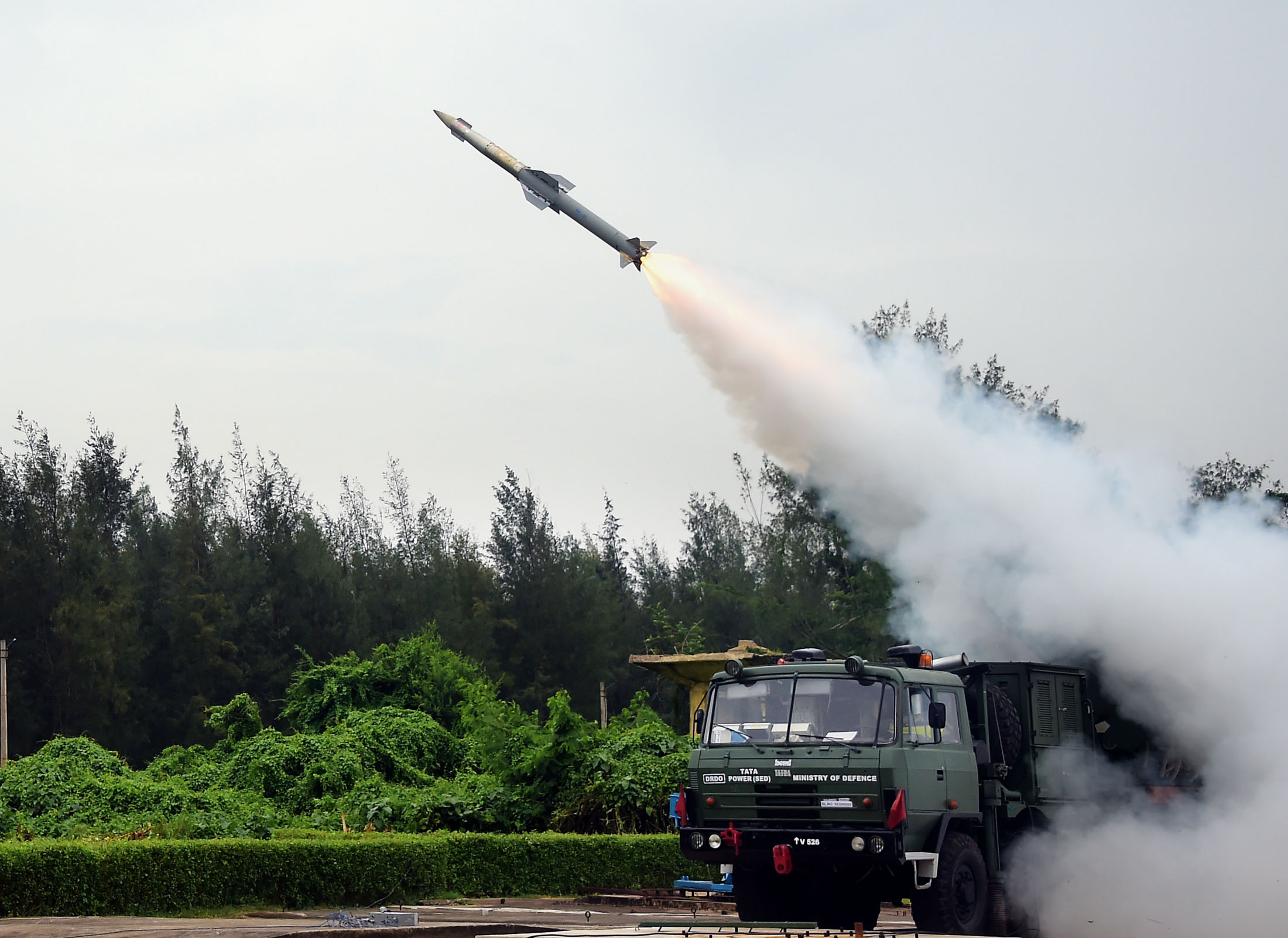
Sub-system validation test (3 July 2017).

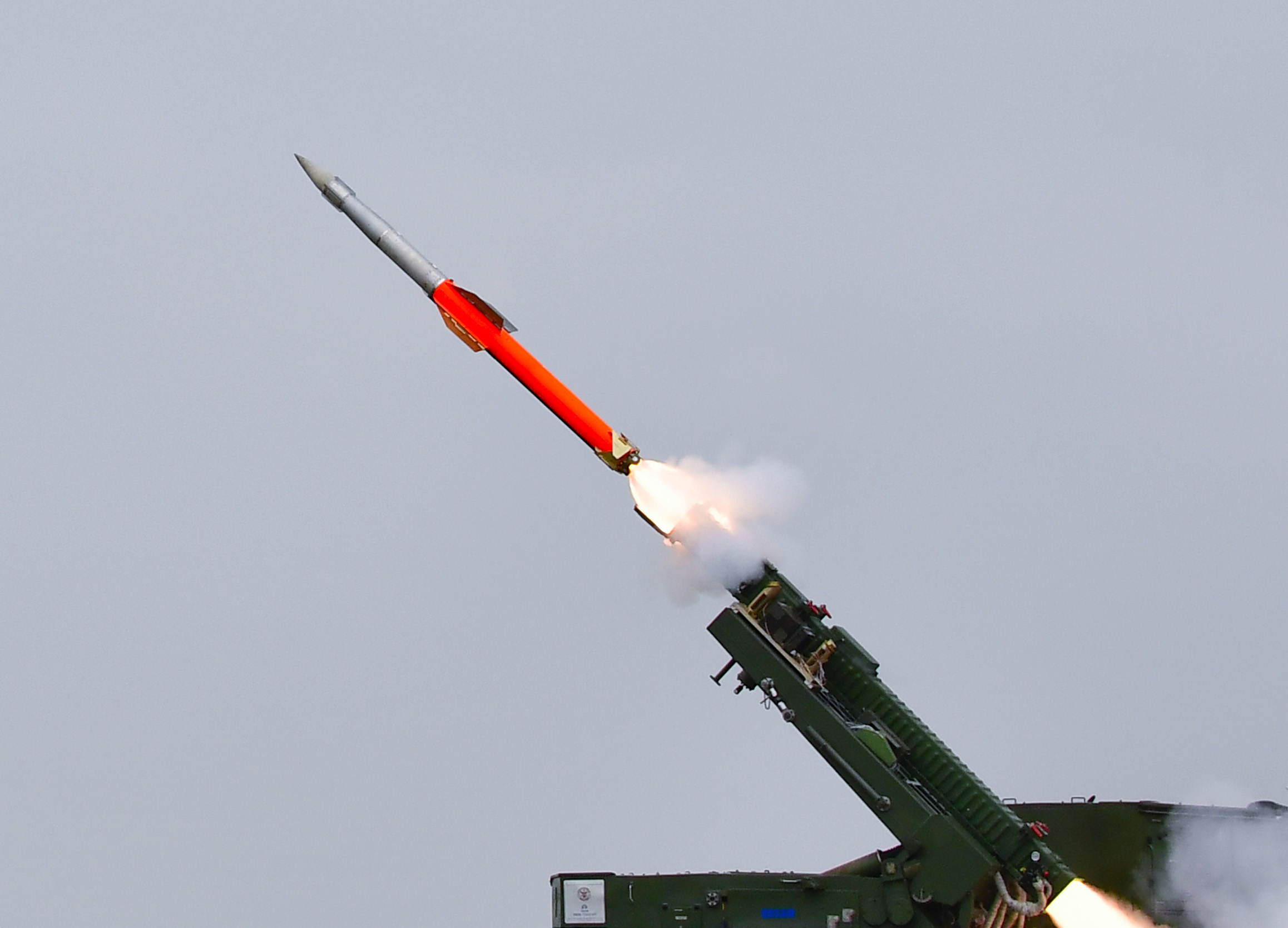
Aerodynamics verification, high maneuverability demo, propulsion & structural performance at various elevations (26 February 2019).

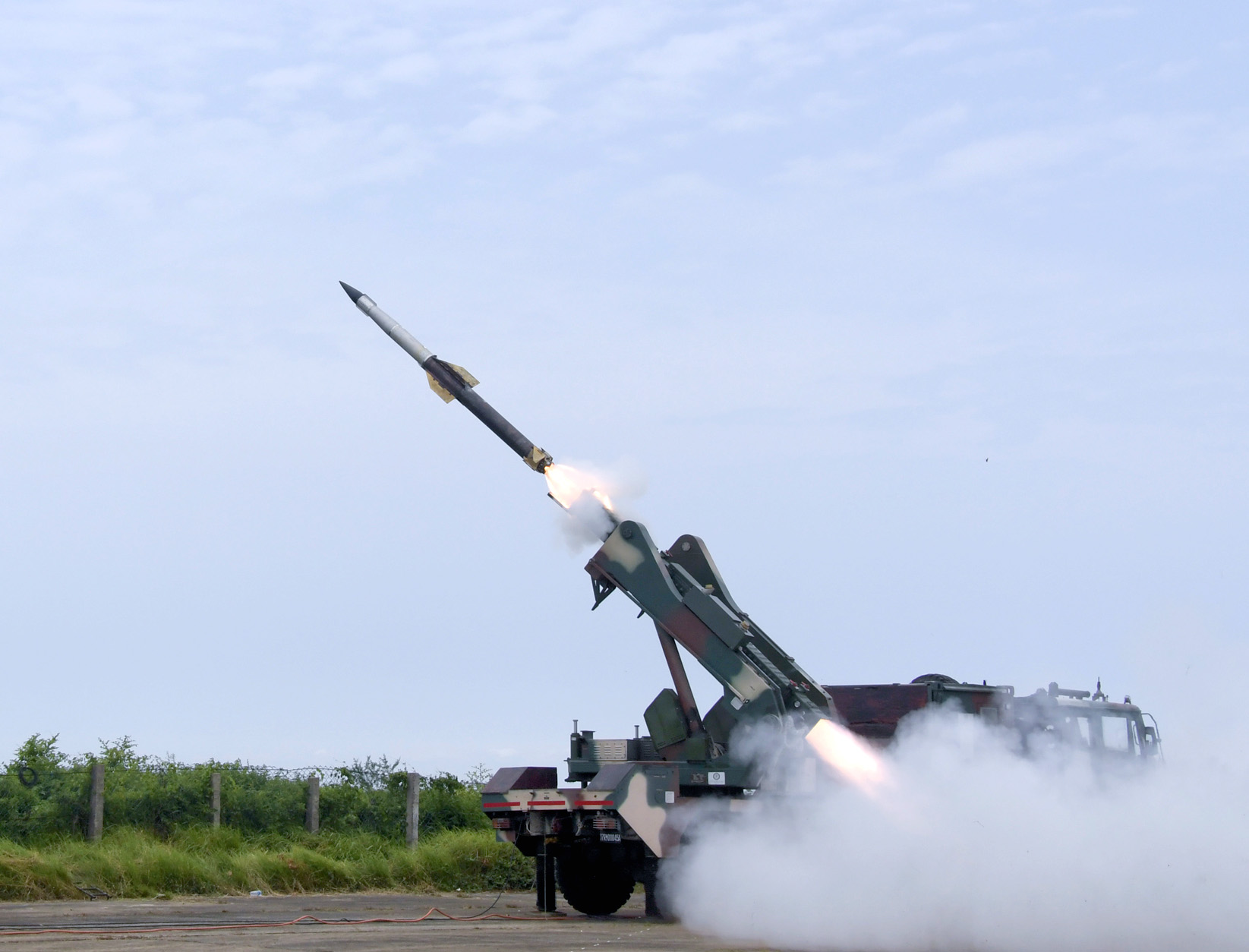
Multiple threat engagement with live targets (4 August 2019).

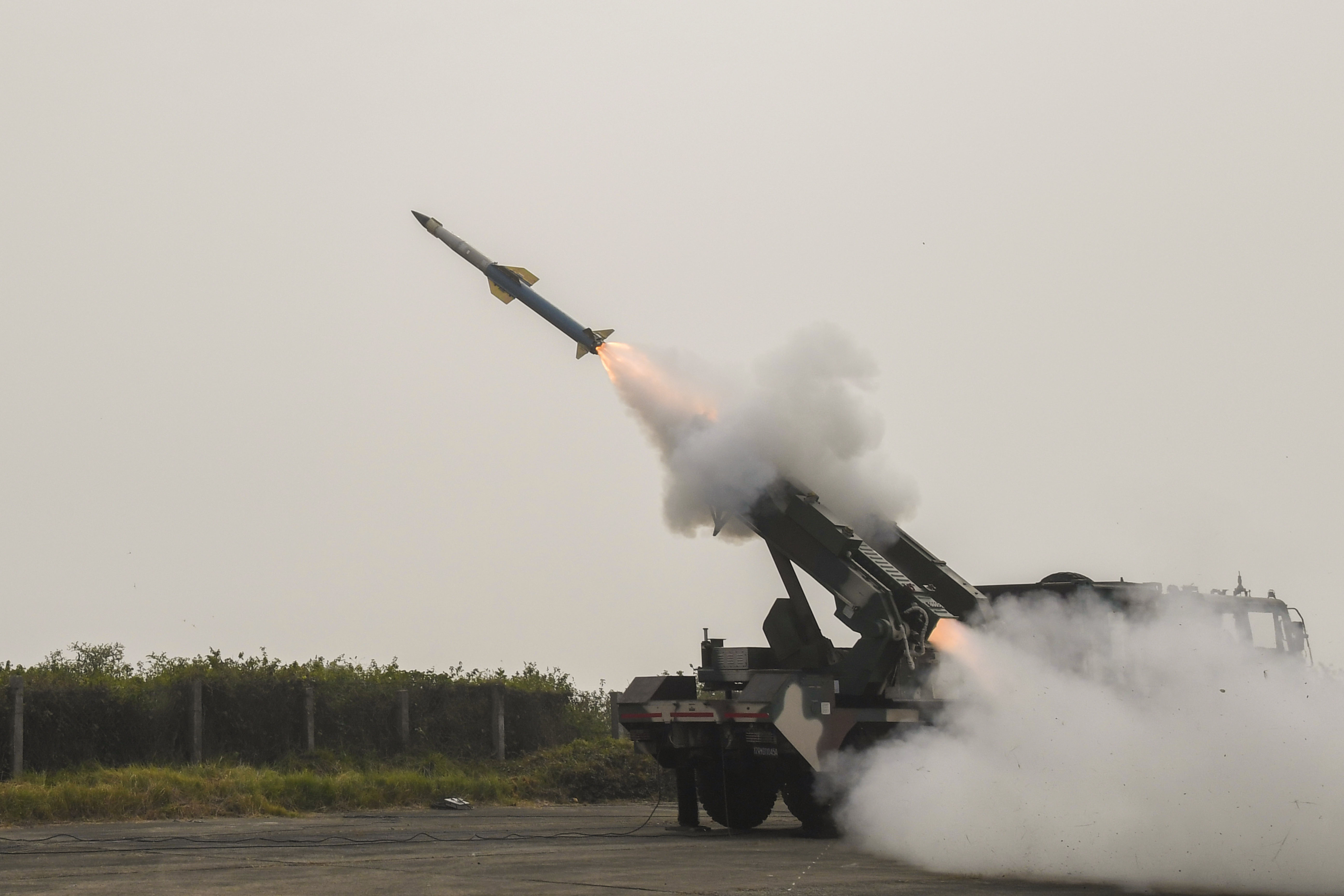
Flight-tested in full configuration deployment mode (23 December 2019).

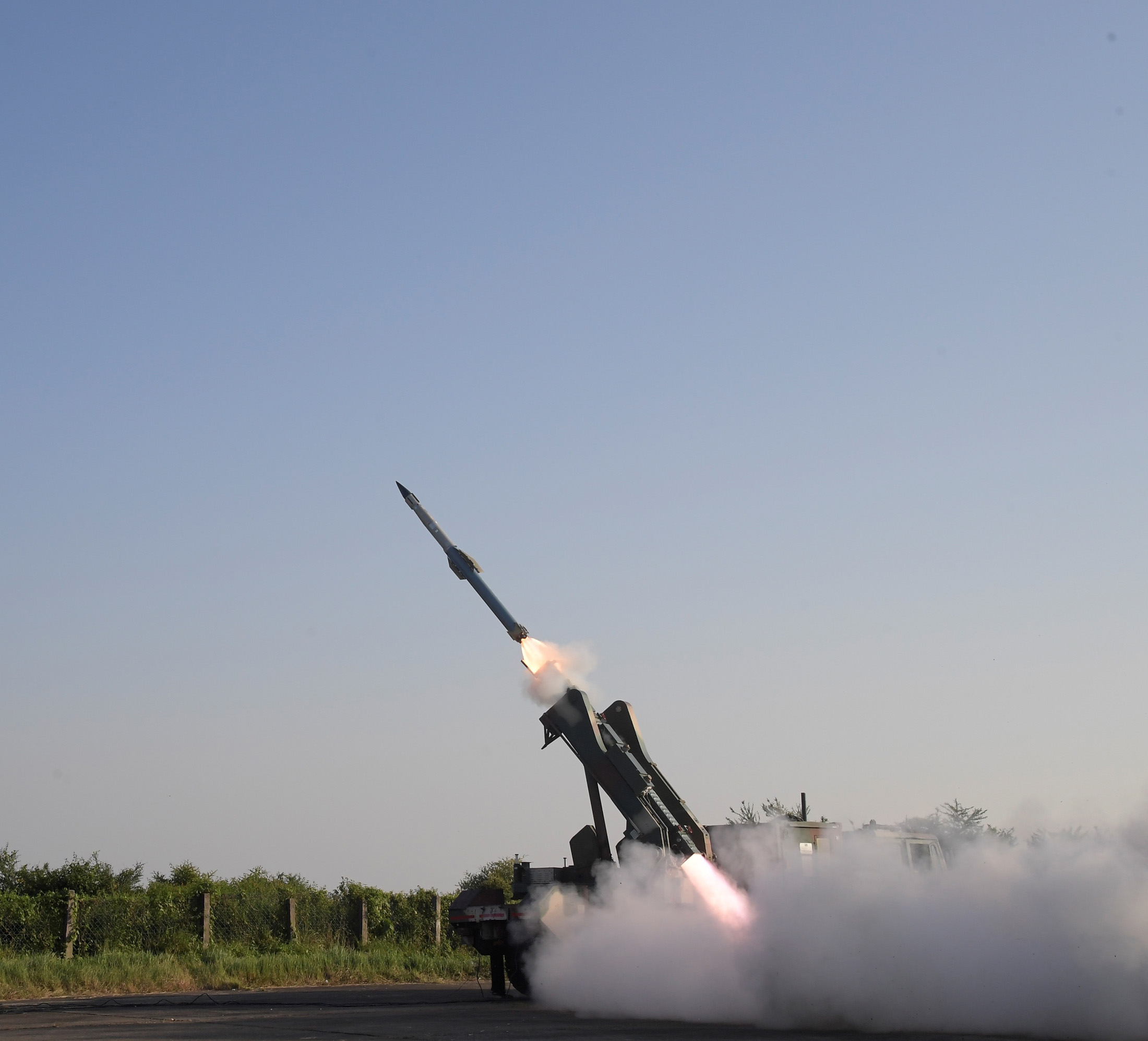
Maximum range tracking and direct hit of QinetiQ Banshee, by terminal active homing using RF seeker (13 November 2020).

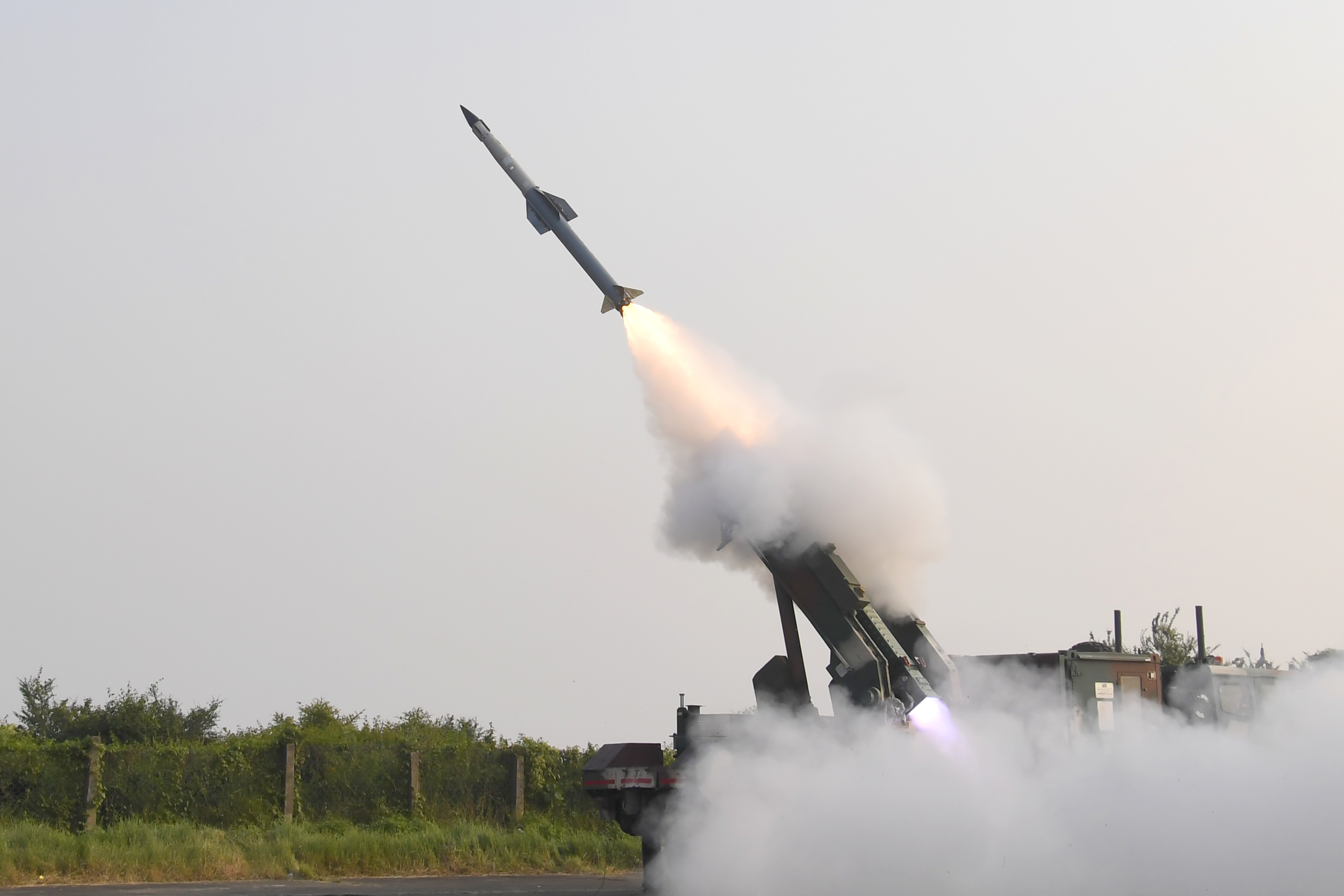
Proximity operation against QinetiQ Banshee. Warhead activation & performance assessment (17 November 2020).

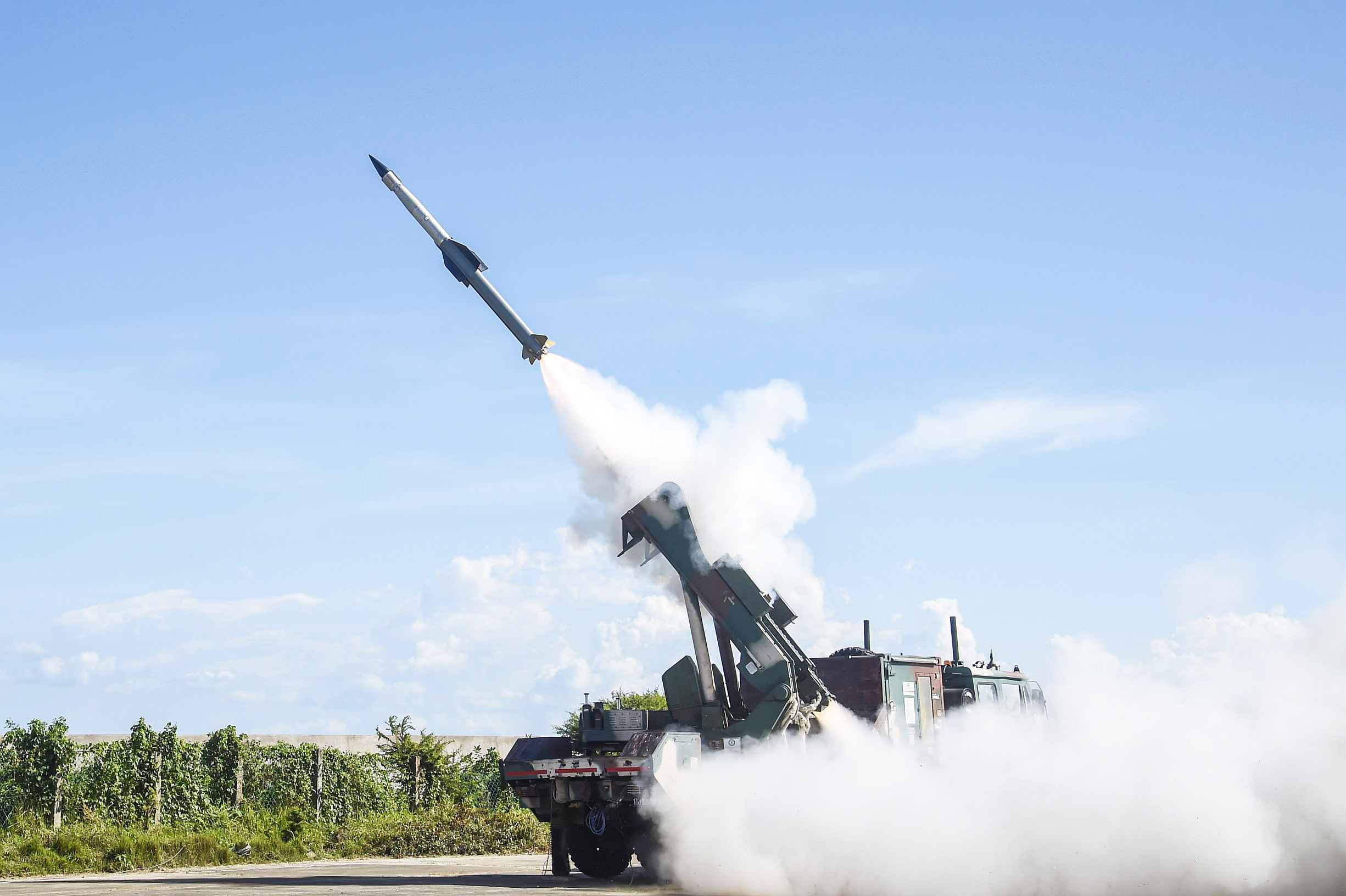
Flight-test against high-speed aerial targets mimicking different threat scenarios (1 September 2022).

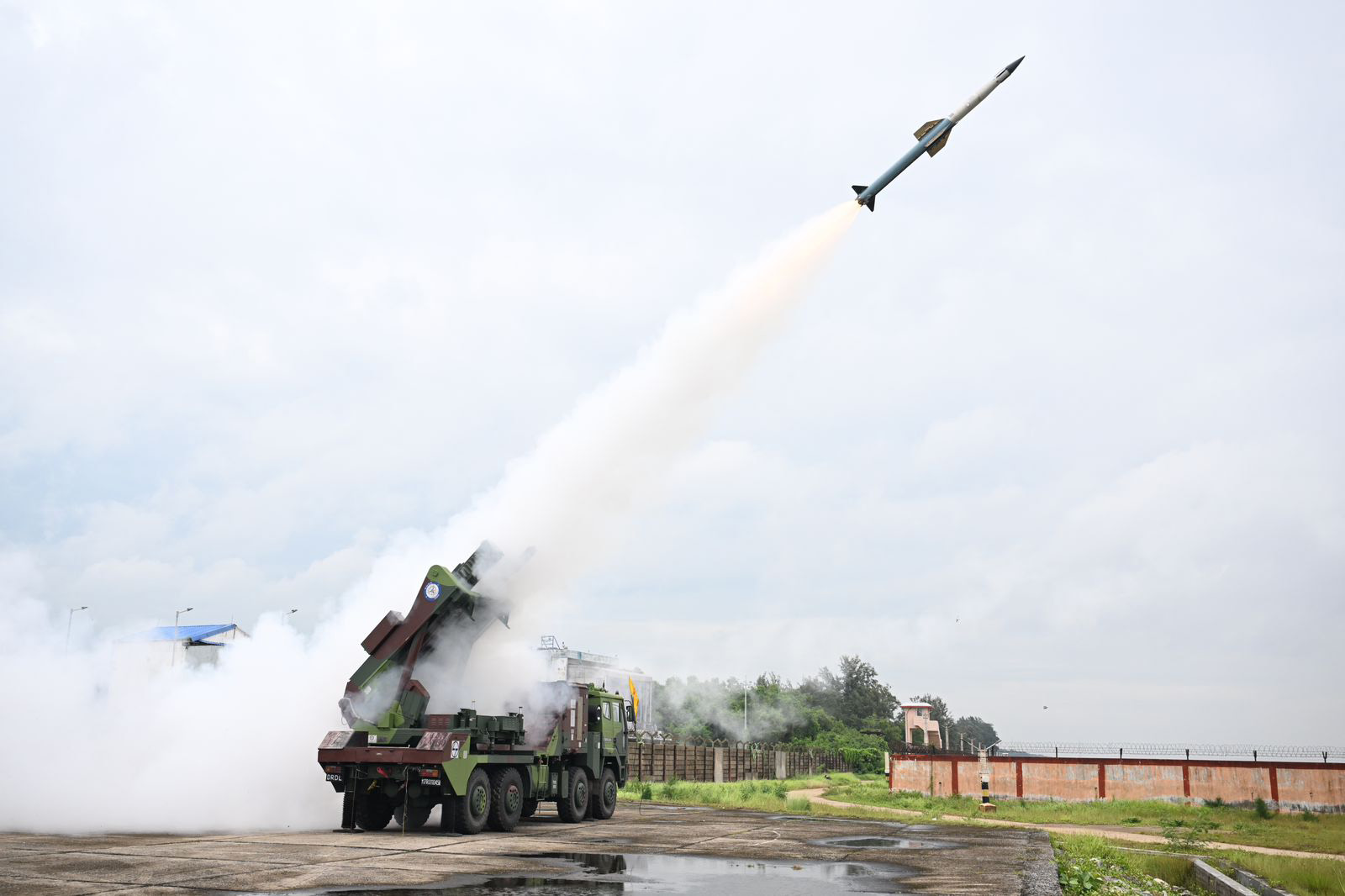
QRSAM test as part of Integrated Air Defence Weapon System (23 August 2025).

== See also ==
- Trishul – (India)
- Maitri – (India)
- Barak 8 – (India, Israel)
- Akash-NG – (India)
- Akash – (India)
- VL-SRSAM – (India)
- Advanced Air Defence – (India) (AAD)
- Prithvi Air Defence – (India) (PAD)
