= Akashteer =

India's Automated Air Defence Control & Reporting System

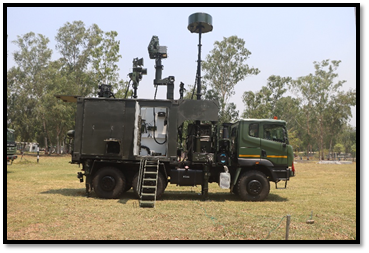
- Akashteer C4ISR
- Type: Air defence system
- Place of origin: India

Service history
- In service: 2024 – present
- Used by: Corps of Army Air Defence
- Wars: 2025 India–Pakistan conflict

Production history
- Designer: Bharat Electronics; DRDO; ISRO
- Manufacturer: Bharat Electronics
- Produced: 4 April 2024
- No. built: 107

Akashteer (lit. 'Sky Arrow') is an AI-enabled, fully automated Air Defence Control & Reporting System, which is designed, developed and manufactured by Bharat Electronics in collaboration with Defence Research and Development Organisation and Indian Space Research Organisation. By providing tactical command and control, it enhances the capability of the Indian Army's Corps of Army Air Defence. Akashteer makes it possible to effectively handle ground-based air defense weapon systems and monitor low-level airspace in combat zones. The Akashteer is similar to the US Integrated Air and Missile Defense Battle Command System.

To improve air defense jointness, the Akashteer is connected to the Air Force's Integrated Air Command and Control System (IACCS) and the Navy's Trigun system. This allows the Joint Air Defence Centre (JADC) to access Army sensors through Akashteer, Air Force sensors and civilian radars through IACCS, and naval ship-based sensors through Trigun. IAF will be responsible for the JADC. While integration for additional sites is still under progress, one site is fully integrated as of January 2025.

== History ==
On 29 March 2023, the Ministry of Defence further strengthened the concept of atmanirbharta (self-reliance) in the defence sector by entering into a contract with Bharat Electronics Limited (BEL), Ghaziabad. This contract valued at ₹1,982 crore (US$206 million) is known as 'Project Akashteer', which strives to provide situational awareness and control for the military to guarantee the safety of allied aircraft and confront enemy aircraft in challenging airspace.

By 30 September 2024, BEL delivered the entire 100 units of Akashteer system to the Indian Army. As of November 2024, 107 units were delivered with another 105 units planned by March 2025. The Army will receive the entire order for 455 units by April 2027.

In November 2024, it was reported that the Indian Army conducted validation trials of Akashteer simulating scenarios as expected in future wars.

On 27 March 2026, the Defence Acquisition Council (DAC), chaired by the Defence Minister, cleared the development of the Air Defence Tracked System, a tracked variant to provide real time Air Defence Control and Reporting capability.

== Functions ==
The Akashteer system integrates the entire surveillance assets, radar systems, communication nodes and other command and control units of the Indian Army's Air Defence networks into a single network to enhance the situational awareness. The system is vehicle-based which makes it mobile and easier to handle in hostile environment. The system automates the entire air defence mechanism enhancing the response mechanism to any threats. It is anticipated that this integration will reduce the possibility of friendly fire, enabling quick engagement of hostile targets, and guarantee friendly aircraft safety in contested airspace. The sensors integrated include 3D Tactical Radars, Low-Level Lightweight Radars, the Akash Weapon System and QRSAM. This would ensure a seamless and unified air picture accessible to the lowest operational units of the Army Air Defence (AD), which enhances coordination and situational awareness across the force. Akashteer increases automation and efficiency by eliminating human inputs and decentralising.

Akashteer is a system-of-systems with zero dependencies on foreign satellites or components. The system included locally developed AI processors and battlefield nodes, zero-latency integration of ISRO's Earth observation satellites, precision mapping of NavIC, and self-updating command grids for dynamic targeting by removing human-delay loop. Using information from multiple sources, the edge-AI war-cloud makes judgments in real time, reroutes missions, and launches attacks on its own. Akashteer system substitutes conventional ground command centers, allows decentralized plug-and-fight combat using a laptop, and can be field deployed from trucks, jeeps, or mobile units. It can defend and strike an area of about 300 kilometers. On the basis of real-time data, Akashteer can self-reprogram drone swarms that are armed with reconnaissance kits, jammers, and 5–10 kg explosives.

Using satellite imagery, AI analytics, and stealth-based surveillance, Akashteer has the ability to monitor hostile drones without the need of active radar. Through accurate target verification and inter-unit coordination, the system also averts friendly fire. It will integrate with Mission Sudarshan Chakra. By classifying airspace users in a conflict zone as friendly, neutral, or hostile, the Akashteer aids SAKSHAM in improving situational awareness.

== Service history ==
The Indian Army inducted Akashteer in 2024. It was part of India's Air Defence Network during Operation Sindoor where the system effectively foiled multiple of Pakistan's drone and missile attacks. Throughout the conflict, it intercepted drones, missiles, micro-UAVs, and loitering munitions. It also made sure that the lowest operating Army Air Defense unit had a consistent and seamless air situation picture, which improved situational awareness throughout the force. It was reported that it "struck down every drone with a 100% kill rate". It is India's first AI war-cloud in operation.

As part of Exercise Josh 2-26, the IACCS and Akashteer integrated network was successfully upgraded. The Army's Northern Command, Western Command, and South Western Command, as well as Western Air Command, validated the system on 7 June 2026. The improvement will shorten the sensor-to-shooter latency by enabling quicker reaction times. An airfield in north India was used to exercise logistical deployment as part of the validation.

== Export ==
As per a June 2026 report by the Reuters, Akashteer is one of the weapon systems that are on offer to the United Arab Emirates (UAE) from India along with the BrahMos system. The discussions are at early stages but are "progressing rapidly".

== Operators ==
=== Current operators ===
India

- Indian Army - 107 in service. Total 455 on order.

=== Potential operators ===
United Arab Emirates

== See also ==
- Integrated Air and Missile Defense Battle Command System - American equivalent
- List of regiments and corps of the Indian Army
- List of equipment of the Indian Army
- Mission Sudarshan Chakra - proposed multi-layer defense system for India
- SAKSHAM - command & control (Indian Army)
