= VSHORAD (India) =

Indian anti-aircraft missile

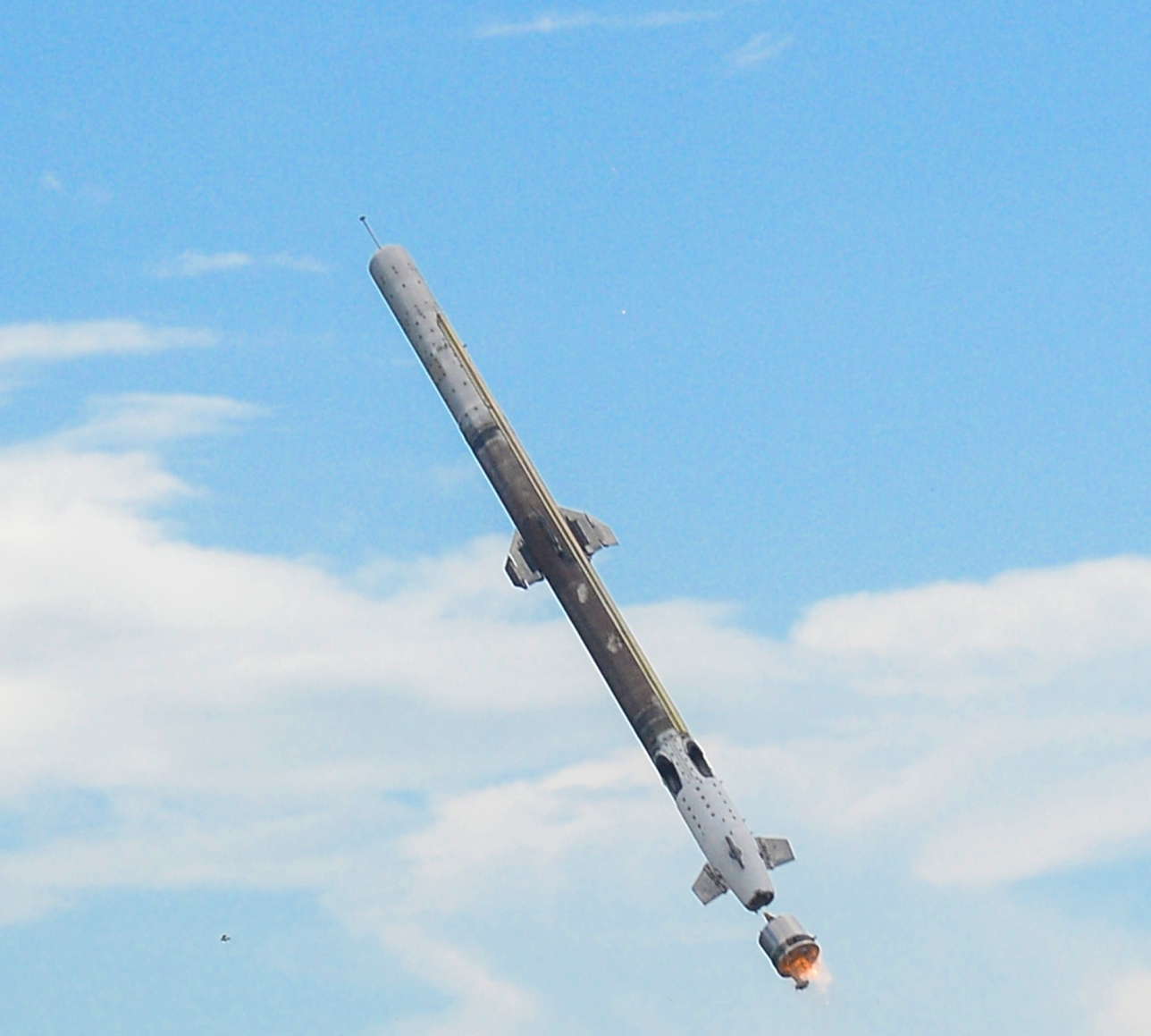
- VSHORAD
- Type: Short range air defense; Man-portable air-defense system
- Place of origin: India

Service history
- In service: Under development
- Used by: Indian Armed Forces

Production history
- Designer: Research Centre Imarat
- Manufacturer: Adani Defence & Aerospace; ICOMM Tele Limited

Specifications
- Mass: 20.5 kg (45 lb)
- Length: 2.00 metres (6 ft 7 in)
- Diameter: 90 mm (3.5 in)
- Wingspan: 32 cm (13 in)
- Warhead: 2.0 kg (4.4 lb)
- Detonation mechanism: Adaptive proximity fuze
- Engine: Dual-thrust rocket motor
- Propellant: Solid propellant
- Operational range: 250 m (820 ft) – 6 km (20,000 ft)
- Flight altitude: 3,500 m (11,500 ft)
- Maximum speed: Mach 1.5
- Guidance system: Dual waveband IIR
- Launch platform: Shoulder-launched; Tripod weapon system; Vehicle mounted system (Anti-Drone system); CROSSHAIR-N Naval system (1×8)

The Very Short Range Air Defence System, or VSHORADS, is a fourth-generation man-portable air-defense system (MANPADS) developed by Research Centre Imarat, located in Hyderabad. Multiple DRDO laboratories along with Indian industry partners are participating in the project. It is designed for anti-aircraft warfare and neutralising low altitude aerial threats at short ranges. The system also forms a part of the Integrated Air Defence Weapon System (IADWS).

== History ==
Igla-1M has been in use by the Indian Army since the 1980s. Presently, the system is ill-equipped to handle emerging contemporary threats.

In 2010, the Ministry of Defence released the request for proposal for the VSHORAD program, which initiated the beginning of the selection process. When the VSHORAD order was first proposed in 2010, its estimated value was ₹27,000 crores. It was listed as part of the high priority procurement program by the Indian Armed Forces. Several variants, including ship-based pedestals, man-portable/vehicle-mounted versions, were planned for acquisition.

The obsolescence of Army's air defence inventory was noted by Chief of the Army Staff General V. K. Singh in a letter to former Prime Minister Manmohan Singh in March 2012. The Technical Evaluation Committee examined and approved the Rosoboronexport 9K338 Igla-S (SA-24 Grinch), Saab RBS 70 NG, MBDA Mistral, and LIG Nex1 KP-SAM Chiron in January 2012. While Starstreak from Thales Air Defence had already been rejected for non-compliance at the paper evaluation stage. The LIG Nex1 KP-SAM Chiron was removed after failing to appear for trials. The MoD paused the process as it reviewed Raytheon's offer to sell its FIM-92 Stinger on a government-to-government basis. The negotiations were unsuccessful as there was minimal progress on technology transfer.

The Rosoboronexport 9K338 Igla-S (SA-24 Grinch), the Saab RBS 70 NG, and the MBDA Mistral were the three competitors for the order, and their trials were concluded in 2013. According to reports in December 2015, India was thinking of forgoing a global tender in favor of an indigenous project falling under the Buy and Make (Indian) procurement category. The staff evaluation is meant to be finished in a maximum of 12 weeks, as per the Defence Procurement Procedure, but it was not finished until 2016.

The MoD conducted re-confirmatory trials in 2016 as a result of vendor non-compliance. In 2017, the procurement process was stalled by the noncompliance of two out of three vendors.

In 2018, the Army's effort to acquire Man-Portable Air Defence Systems came to an end. After receiving bids from Sweden's Saab RBS70 NG and France's MBDA Mistral, Russia's 9K338 Igla-S (SA-24 Grinch), has been deemed the lowest bidder for $3 billion competitive tender.

A total of 5,175 missiles and related equipment, such as launchers, sensors, thermal imaging sights, and command and control units, have been requested by the Indian Army under the VSHORAD program. Of these, about 2,300 will be imported in full, 260 will be in semi-knocked down condition, 1,000 will be completely knocked down, and 600 will be produced in India.

== Development ==
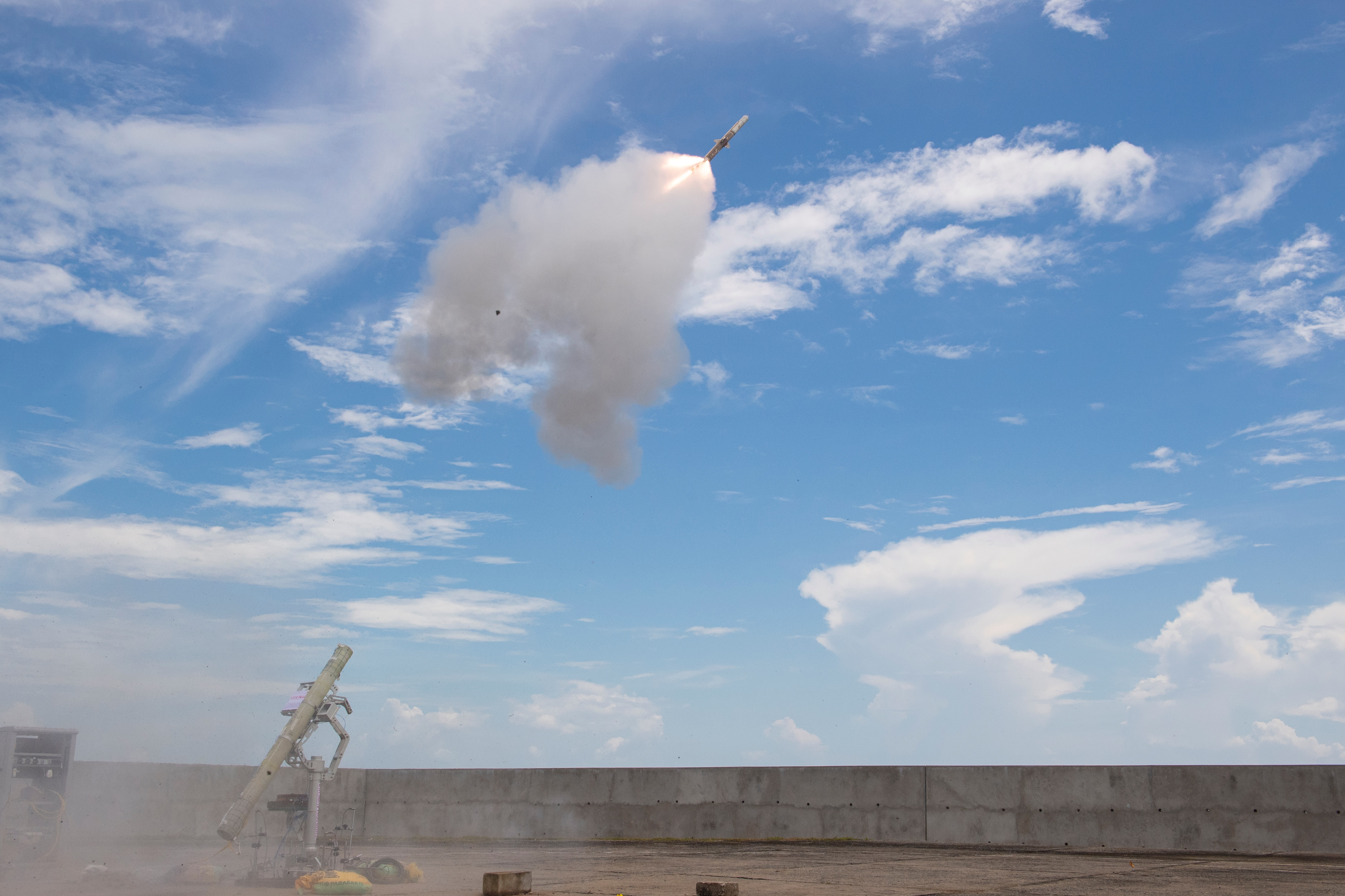
Maiden launch of Very Short Range Air Defence System

Under the Very Short Range Air Defence Systems program, the Ministry of Defence is examining the 9K338 Igla-S (SA-24 Grinch) system. To promote Make in India and reduce the import of weapons, the procurement is being delayed. However, a small number of 9K338 Igla-S (SA-24 Grinch) system that were acquired from Russia under emergency procurement have been used by the Indian Army.

Meanwhile, DRDO seized the opportunity and began developing its own VSHORAD. RCI is responsible for the design and development of VSHORAD, working with other DRDO laboratories and Indian business partners.

On January 11, 2023, the MoD granted the VSHORAD (IR Homing) missile variant Acceptance of Necessity (AoN).

Reportedly, the DRDO VSHORAD is being built concurrently with another Indian VSHORAD project as a joint venture between a public sector entity based in Hyderabad (possibly Bharat Dynamics Limited) and a private sector entity based in Pune. To counter drones, helicopters, and fighter jets flying at low altitude, the latter missile will be laser beam riding VSHORAD system. An order of 200 launchers and 1200 missiles is expected for this project, which is valued at ₹4,800 crore (US$500 million). While Indian Army will procure 700 missiles, the Indian Air Force will procure the rest of it.

DRDO has developed a tripod-based weapon system as of May 2024, and work is in progress to miniaturize the technology for use as a shoulder-launched variant. The Indian Army is expected to place an initial order for about 500 launchers and 3000 missiles for the DRDO VSHORAD project. On 26 July 2024, Minister of State for Defence Sanjay Seth notified the Parliament in writing that the development of the shoulder fired variant can make use of certain subsystems and technology from VSHORADS project.

The development of the miniaturized fourth generation man-portable air-defense system VSHORADS was officially completed on 5 October 2024 after a series of developmental trials. As part of the Development cum Production Partner programme, DRDO has selected Adani Defence & Aerospace and ICOMM Tele Limited. Since inception, the VSHORAD project has involved every branch of the Indian Armed Forces.

The Ministry of Defence released a request for proposal for the procurement of 48 launchers, 48 night vision sights, 85 missiles, and one missile test station of the infrared (IR) homing-based VSHORADS, designated VSHORADS (New Generation) or VSHORAD (NG). The missile should have flexible deployment including "Manportable configuration or Para dropped operations method, on land and ship based platforms". The system could be used by all three services for day-night terminal and point air defence.

== Design ==
The missile is propelled by dual-thrust rocket motor and is made to take out low flying targets. To guarantee effortless mobility, the missile's design, encompassing the launcher, has undergone extensive optimization.

VSHORAD missile incorporates integrated avionics and miniaturized reaction control system to increase mid-air maneuverability. The missile uses a state-of-art uncooled infrared imaging seeker.

By varying its thrust, the dual pulse solid propellant rocket motor of the VSHORADS preserves its maneuverability, boosting thrust when required. In order to improve its kill capabilities, the dual waveband infrared imaging seeker can identify its target and use target-specific pursuit algorithms. Under complex countermeasure environments, the seeker can distinguish between targets and decoys with high precision. The reactive thrust vectoring mechanism and aerodynamic surfaces enable complicated and erratic maneuvers while in flight.

VSHORADS is intended to give forward positions, armored units, and infantry instant protection.

== Testing ==
=== Developmental trials ===
Proof test for reaction control system and integrated avionics on 27 September 2022.

- On 27 September 2022, DRDO conducted two successful test flights of VSHORAD missile from a ground-based portable launcher from Integrated Test Range, off the coast of Odisha. A Ministry of Defence statement read "VSHORAD missile incorporates many novel technologies including miniaturised Reaction Control System (RCS) and integrated avionics, which have been successfully proven during the tests".
- On 14 March 2023, DRDO again conducted two consecutive successful flight tests of VSHORAD missile at the ITR, Chandipur. The flight tests were carried out against a high speed unmanned aerial targets, mimicking approaching and receding aircraft. The targets were successfully intercepted, meeting all mission objectives.
- Warhead flight tests in complete and final design configuration were successfully completed in August and November of 2023.
- On 28 and 29 February 2024, the third and fourth tests were successfully conducted from a ground-based portable launcher. The mission objective, which was to destroy high-speed unmanned targets under different scenarios, was achieved by the tests. The test was witnessed by officials from the Indian Army.
- In June 2024, Asian News International reported that DRDO will carry out high-altitude trials of the missile system at a location like Ladakh or Sikkim. The issues about short-range interception has been sorted out. The high-altitude trials will be followed by user trials by Indian Armed Forces.
- On 3 and 4 October 2024, three successful flight trials of "miniaturised" VSHORAD were conducted by DRDO in the Pokhran Test Range as part of developmental trials. The tests demonstrated the crucial criteria of maximum range and maximum altitude interception against a fast-moving target. It also demonstrated the weapon system's consistent hit-to-kill performance in a range of target engagement situations, including approaching, retreating, and crossing modes. The trials marked the end of developmental trials of the VSHORADS. This will be followed by rapid production and early user trials.
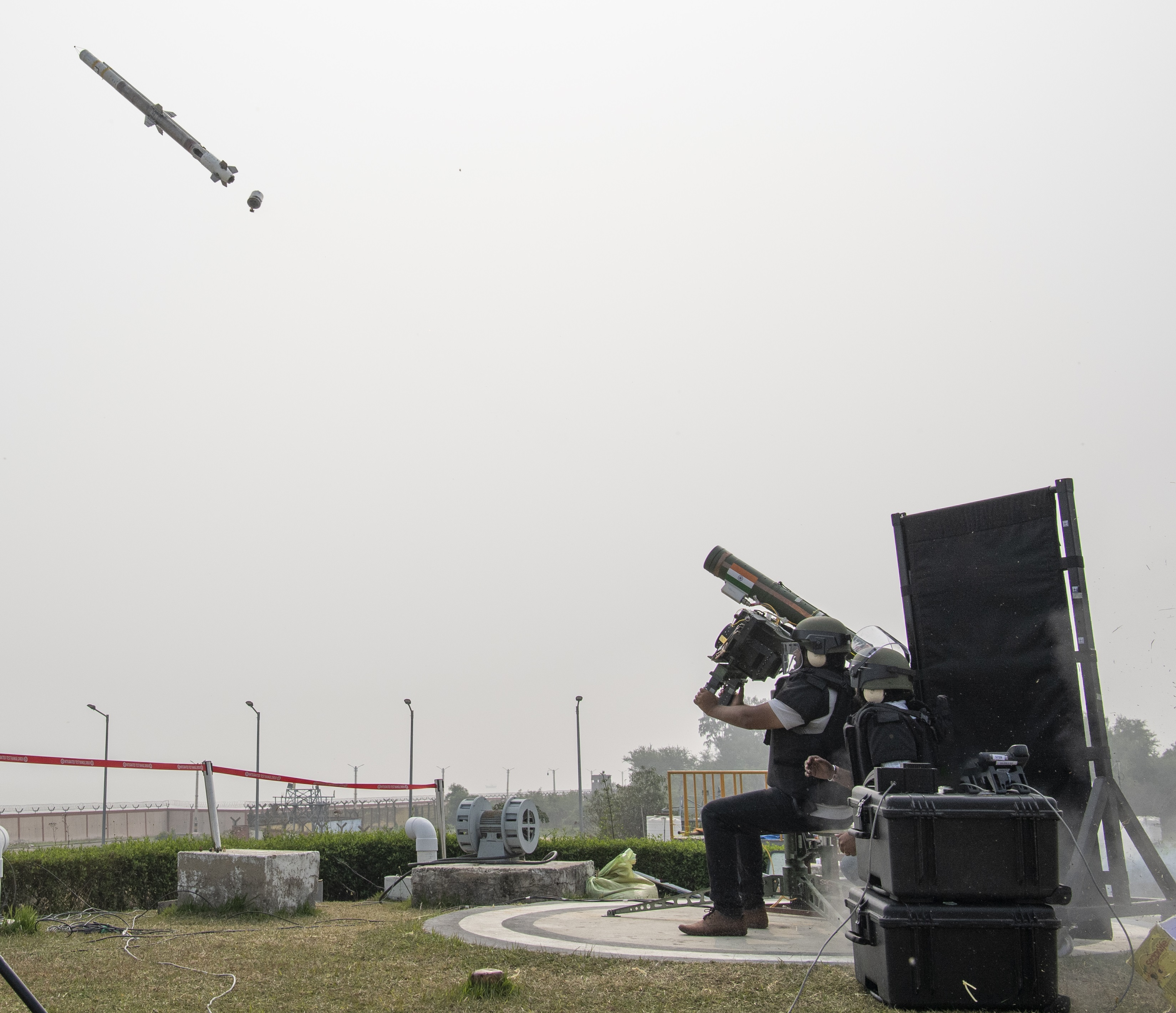
  VSHORAD test firing in final configuration
- On 1 February 2025, three successive flight-trials of VSHORADS from ITR in the final deployment configuration. The trials were conducted against low-altitude, high-speed targets mimicking adversary UAVs with low thermal signatures. The trial, for the first time, included two field operators carried out weapon readiness, target acquisition and missile firing. This established VSHORADS as a missile capable of engaging low-flying drones along with other aerial threats.
- On 27 February 2026, three successive flight-trials of VSHORADS were carried out once again in its final deployment configuration, revalidating the missile's performance against targets of differing speed, range and altitude. In all extreme engagement points, the missiles intercepted and destroyed the fast-moving aerial targets.

=== IADWS Trials ===
- The first Integrated Air Defence Weapon System (IADWS) test was conducted by the DRDO on 23 August 2025 at around 12:30 pm IST, using QRSAM, Advanced VSHORAD, and a high-power laser-based DEW. Two high-speed fixed wing UAVs and a multicopter drone were engaged and destroyed simultaneously at varying distances and altitudes. The Centralised Command and Control System which guided the IADWS has been developed by the Defence Research and Development Laboratory (DRDL), the nodal laboratory of the programme. Meanwhile, the VSHORADS and DEW was developed by Research Centre Imarat (RCI) and Centre for High Energy Systems and Sciences (CHESS), respectively.

== Order ==
According to the MoD's request for proposal to purchase next generation VSHORADs, which was released on 4 May 2025, 48 launchers, 48 night vision sights, 85 missiles, and one missile test station would be purchased under Buy (Indian) category. The Indian design VSHORAD must have at least 50% indigenous content. Foreign design VSHORAD must contain at least 60% indigenous content. The infrared guided VSHORAD should be able to function day and night in all weather conditions, including places covered in snow. The system must work in plains and rivers, deserts, coastal regions, maritime environments and at elevations of 4,500 meters or above. With a maximum range of 6 km, it should be able to reach targets up to 3.5 km altitude.

On 24 June 2025, the Indian Army placed an order for an unknown number of VSHORAD launchers and missiles under the emergency procurement mechanism.

The Defence Acquisition Council (DAC) of India's Defence Ministry cleared multiple procurement projects including that of V-SHORADS for the Indian Army on 3 July 2026.

== Operators ==
India

- Indian Army: 500 launchers and 3000 missiles (planned)
- Indian Air Force and Indian Navy: 300 launchers and 1800 missiles (planned)

== See also ==
- 9K38 Igla – (Soviet Union)
- RBS 70 – (Sweden)
- Mistral – (France)
- KP-SAM Chiron – (South Korea)
- Trishul – (India)
- Maitri – (India)
- Project Kusha – (India)
- Barak 8 – (India, Israel)
- Akash-NG – (India)
- Akash – (India)
- Advanced Air Defence – (India) (AAD)
- Prithvi Air Defence – (India) (PAD)
- QRSAM – (India)
