= SAKSHAM =

Indian military command & control system

- Type: Command and control
- Place of origin: India

Service history
- Used by: Corps of Army Air Defence

Production history
- Designer: Indian Army; Bharat Electronics
- Manufacturer: Bharat Electronics
- Produced: 2025 – present

SAKSHAM (Situational Awareness for Kinetic Soft and Hard Kill Assets Management) is a modular multi-layered, AI-enabled command and control (C2) platform, developed by the Indian Army in collaboration with Indian public sector company Bharat Electronics to secure India's low-altitude airspace, and to enhance the airspace situational awareness and drone defence capabilities. It is part of the counter-unmanned aerial system warfare, integrating real-time detection, tracking, identification, and neutralization functions into a unified digital architecture grid.

It is linked to the doctrinal shift from the Tactical Battle Area (TBA) to a broader Tactical Battlefield Space (TBS), encompassing the air littoral, or airspace up to 3,000 metres (9,800 feet) above ground level which has been recognized as a contested operational layer requiring constant monitoring and control.

== History ==
The Russo-Ukrainian war, 2023 Azerbaijani offensive in Nagorno-Karabakh, Gaza war and 2025 India–Pakistan conflict brought to light the increasing difficulty of hostile UAV activities and the necessity of real-time, multi-layered air defense solutions throughout forward areas. Following Operation Sindoor, when more drone incursions revealed the necessity for a real-time airspace management system, the idea of the Tactical Battlefield Space (TBS) was developed. For the Indian Army, air littoral control became essential to tactical supremacy. In order to combat in a multifaceted battlefield, SAKSHAM became necessary.

The AI-enabled command and control platform for the C-UAS grid was created by the Indian Army in collaboration with Bharat Electronics. SAKSHAM bridges the gap between real-time airborne surveillance and ground-based air defense by controlling airspace up to 3,000 metres (9,800 feet) above land. By functioning as a centralized command node that integrates inputs from various sensors, radars, and missile systems, SAKSHAM can function flawlessly across the Army Data Network (ADN). Its modular architecture guarantees compatibility with current networks, such the Akashteer, to improve target identification and coverage. As part of the Army's integrated air defense grid, the digital architecture enables the synthesis of sensor data to create a single airspace awareness image that can be shared across military units.

== Function ==
In 2025, the Indian Army accepted the system under the Fast Track Procurement (FTP) process to combat low-cost aerial threats. Within the next year, deployment across all operational sectors is anticipated. It is designed to ensure supremacy in both defensive and offensive missions by offering early warning and engagement capabilities in networked, multi-domain operational conditions.

Several counter-drone weaponry and sensors will be connected by SAKSHAM's modular grid, which will combine data from radar, electro-optical systems, and other sources to provide immediate threat alerts and response options. SAKSHAM will serve as the foundation of India's Counter-UAS grid once it is fully operational, providing military commanders situational awareness both on land and in the air. It will be able to quickly respond to drone threats in sensitive areas by integrating with current air defense and surveillance systems within the Indian Armed Forces. With a scalable, and flexible architecture that can be adjusted to changing UAS threats, SAKSHAM provides field commanders with automated decision-making and real-time 3D visualization. The system's AI-powered threat analysis for predictive identification and faster decision-making improves precision in neutralizing aerial targets.

On a single INDIGIS-Enterprise platform, SAKSHAM will combine its own and enemy UAS data, C-UAS sensors, and soft- and hard-kill systems. By classifying all airspace users in a battle zone as friendly, neutral, or hostile, the Akashteer further aids SAKSHAM in improving its situational awareness. Across the battlefield, a Recognized UAS Picture (RUASP) is continuously generated and updated in real time. For a coordinated defensive reaction, it has combined hard-kill (kinetic interception, directed energy) and soft-kill (jamming, spoofing) technologies. All of the Indian Armed Forces' current airspace management systems are compatible with it. Future sensors, weaponry, and AI tools may be added to the system as it develops to feed Mission Sudarshan Chakra.

== Introduction ==
The Indian Army began the acquisition process in October 2025. The system will be under the Corps of Army Air Defence, which will guarantee that ground forces maintain control over the airspace up to 3,000 meters over the ground. It will identify, track, and neutralize enemy drones or aircraft while permitting unrestricted movement of friendly aerial assets. In December 2025, the Indian Army placed an extra order with Bharat Electronics for SAKSHAM.

== See also ==
- Akashteer - Air Defence Control & Reporting System (Indian Army)
- Mission Sudarshan Chakra - proposed multi-layer defense system for India
