= Project Kusha =

Indian long-range surface-to air missile

- Concept art of Project Kusha family
- Type: Long-range surface-to-air missile
- Place of origin: India

Service history
- In service: 2028 (planned)
- Used by: Indian Air Force (on order); Indian Navy (planned)

Production history
- Designer: Defence Research and Development Laboratory; Bharat Electronics
- Designed: 2023 - present
- Manufacturer: Radars and control systems; Bharat Electronics; Missiles; Bharat Dynamics Limited; Solar Industries

Specifications
- Warhead: High explosives, fragmentation
- Detonation mechanism: Optical proximity fuze, hit-to-kill
- Engine: Dual pulse rocket motor + booster
- Propellant: Solid fuel
- Operational range: M1 : 120–150 km (75–93 mi); M2 : 250 km (160 mi); M3 : 350–400 km (220–250 mi)
- Flight altitude: 30 km (98,000 ft)
- Maximum speed: Mach 5.5
- Guidance system: Mid-course: INS + GNSS-assisted mid-course adjustment Terminal: AESA mmWave RF/IIR hybrid
- Launch platform: Transporter Erector Launcher

Project Kusha, or Extended Range Air Defence System (ERADS), is a programme under the Defense Research and Development Organization for the Indian Air Force and Indian Navy. The programme was also previously referred to as XRSAM (Note: eXtra Long Range Surface to Air Missile). The goal is to design a mobile long-range surface-to-air missile system. The phased induction of the missile system consisting three variants of interceptors into the services is expected between 2028 and 2030.

Project Kusha will initially supplement the S-400, Barak 8 and Indian Ballistic Missile Defence Programme, with plans to eventually replace the foreign systems. It is also one of the element of Mission Sudarshan Chakra.

== Development ==
The missile system might be used to bridge the gap between the MR-SAM (80 km) and S-400 (400 km). It is being developed as an area-defence system. The Indian Air Force will be the lead agency for this air defence system.

The project was cleared for development by the Cabinet Committee on Security in May 2022, and was granted Acceptance of Necessity (AoN) by the Ministry of Defence in September 2023 for procuring five of its squadrons for the IAF for ₹21,700 crore (equivalent to ₹240 billion or US$2.5 billion in 2026).

The naval version of the missile might be also developed to supplement the LR-SAM missile in the Indian Navy.

The seekers are being developed by Research Centre Imarat, while the Defence Research and Development Laboratory is in charge of interceptor development. As of August 2024, DRDO was about to start the fabrication process of 5 M1 missiles (range of 150 km). DRDO has also placed order for 20 sets of airframes, 20 sets of rocket motors, 50 sets of kill vehicles (warhead), onboard & ground transceivers for telemetry. The missiles are expected to begin testing in early 2025.

Bharat Electronics is the development partner for various radars and control systems, while Bharat Dynamics Limited and Solar Industries have been chosen as Development-cum-Production Partners for missile assembly, solid rocket motor integration, warhead fitting, and canisterisation.

As of May 2025, BEL was reportedly scheduled to complete the manufacturing of the prototype of the missile system within 12 to 18 months. This would be followed by user trials for a period of 12 to 36 months. BEL will also be one of the integration partner of the missile system when the production starts. The first trials for M1 missile is expected in September 2025 while the same for next two missiles is expected in 2026 and 2027, respectively. The phased induction of all the three missiles is expected between 2028 and 2030. Following the Operation Sindoor, the IAF has requested DRDO to fast-track the development of the missile system.

However, as of August 2025, the timeline of M1 missile was now shifted to 2026, with the same for M2 and M3 expected to commence in 2027 and 2028, respectively.

In February 2026, Defence Secretary, Rajesh Kumar Singh, announced the success of initial testing of Project Kusha missiles. The Indian government has given the project top priority following 2026 Iran war, and DRDO anticipates testing all three interceptors within a year. The first system could be deployed in Kolkata between 2030 and 2032 as per reports.

== Trials ==
- The maiden test of the missile system was conducted on 23 July 2026 from the Launch Complex IV (LC-IV) of the Integrated Test Range (ITR) at the Abdul Kalam Island. The missile was fired against an electronic target simulating high-speed and high-altitude aerial adversaries. The system's performance envelope was validated by the interceptor's successful kill beyond 142 km, despite the intended engagement distance of 120 km.

== Design ==
The missile system, often compared to Russia's S-400 missile system, includes three variants of interceptor missiles, designated M1, M2 and M3. The missiles will have ranges of 150 km (93 mi), 250 km (160 mi) and 350–400 km (220–250 mi), respectively. While all the variants will share the same kill vehicle, they will have different boosters to meet different ranges. This system will also feature advanced long-range surveillance and fire control radars. The air defence system will be capable of detecting and destroying enemy assets like cruise missiles, hypersonic weapons, stealth fighter jets, and drones at around 250 km range and larger aircraft like airborne early warning and control at a range of 350 km.

The Akash-NG airframe serves as the foundation for the M1 missile. A dual-pulse solid-propellant rocket motor equipped with thrust-vectoring nozzles powers the missile. Before switching to a dual-mode AESA mmWave RF/IIR seeker for terminal phase target engagement, the missile uses inertial navigation with GNSS-assisted mid-course adjustments for guidance. The missile has a hit-to-kill vehicle and a directional high-explosive fragmentation warhead with optical proximity fuze. During terminal phase intercept, the use of hybrid RF/IIR seeker is to deny the effectiveness of chaff and passive countermeasures.

Gallium nitride transmit-receive modules (T/R modules) and digital beam-forming will be used in Project Kusha's S-band Long Range Battle Management Radar to provide an expanded surveillance coverage beyond 500 km against airborne threats. The 360-degree rotating S-band AESA radar will be more resistant to electronic jamming, have better target resolution against low-RCS threats, and will reject clutter more effectively.

The missile batteries will be able to “interact” with the Integrated Air Command and Control System. It is a fully-automated air defence network operated by the Indian Air Force that combines numerous military and civilian radars with each other in Indian airspace to make the air defence system more efficient and reliable. Project Kusha's network-centric architecture is designed to provide coordinated missile firing, automated threat prioritization, simultaneous tracking of multiple targets, and faster reaction times in high-intensity combat scenarios. In order to resist increasingly quick, low-observable aerial threats, the sensor-to-shooter architecture will compress the window between threat detection and missile launch, reducing kill-chain delay. By facilitating cross-domain coordination, IACCS will guarantee that military sensors and civil aviation radars can contribute to a single situational awareness grid.

The development of a long-range naval version that can intercept anti-ship ballistic missile hitting up to Mach 7 is underway, with a range of more than 250 km (160 mi). According to DRDO, the interceptor missile will prioritize saturation strikes above single-target precision alone, with a single-shot kill probability of over 80 percent, and above 90 percent in coordinated salvo engagements.

== Manufacturing ==
As a system integrator, Bharat Electronics anticipates a possible order from Project Kusha worth up to ₹40,000 crore (US$4.2 billion). BEL is committed to accelerating system readiness and product development. The company is working on developing control systems and radars.

In order to produce 300–400 missiles a year by 2032, BEL and Bharat Dynamics Limited are expanding their infrastructure. Two 3D long-range observation radars and multi-function fire-control radars will assist each squadron's eight launchers, each of which will carry twelve missiles.

On 8 April 2026, BEL committed more than ₹562 crore to the Uttar Pradesh Defence Industrial Corridor, allocating 75 hectares of land in Chitrakoot for the production of Project Kusha. Solar Industries will help contributing to the production of solid rocket motors and advanced propellants, notably the booster of the M2 interceptor.

== Operators ==
India

- Indian Air Force — 5 squadrons (on order). 10 squadrons planned.
- Indian Navy — Planned

== See also ==
Similar systems

- S-400 missile system – (Soviet Union, Russia)
- S-500 missile system – (Russia)
- Terminal High Altitude Area Defence – (United States) (THAAD)

Related lists

- List of surface-to-air missiles
- List of anti-aircraft weapons
