= Army Air Defence College =

Indian military training college

- Former names: Anti-Aircraft Technical Training Battery; Air Defence & Guided Missile School and Centre (1989–1998)
- Type: Military
- Established: 1989; 37 years ago
- Affiliations: Corps of Army Air Defence
- Commandant: Lt. Gen. U. V. Talur, AVSM VSM
- Location: Gopalpur Cantonment, Ganjam, Odisha, India; 19.260529°N 84.8689369°E
- Campus: 2728.568 acres (approx)
- Inaugurated by: Indira Gandhi
- Colors: Sky Blue & Red
- Website: AADC-Indian Army

The Army Air Defence College, (abbreviated as AADC), is the training college for the Army Air Defence Corps of Indian Army. The college is located in the Gopalpur Military Station in Ganjam, Odisha. It spreads over an area of 2728 acres of land. The primary objective of the academy is to impart technical and operational knowledge to the personnel of Indian Army posted to the Corps of Army Air Defence (AAD) about the air defence systems and anti-aircraft warfare. Besides the army personnel, the college also trains personnel from navy, air force and officers from friendly foreign nations.

The history of the college dates back to mid 1940s when anti-aircraft training battery was established by the British in July 1940 at Karachi (now Pakistan) to train the troops deputed to the newly established air defence artillery. Post-independence Air Defence & Guided Missile School and Centre was established at Gopalpur. The school was later renamed as 'Army Air Defence College (AADC)' in 1998. The college enjoyed autonomy after the splitting of the Corps of Army Air Defence from the Regiment of Artillery. In 2008, the Army Air Defence Centre and in 2014, Army Air Defence Records were also moved to Gopalpur .

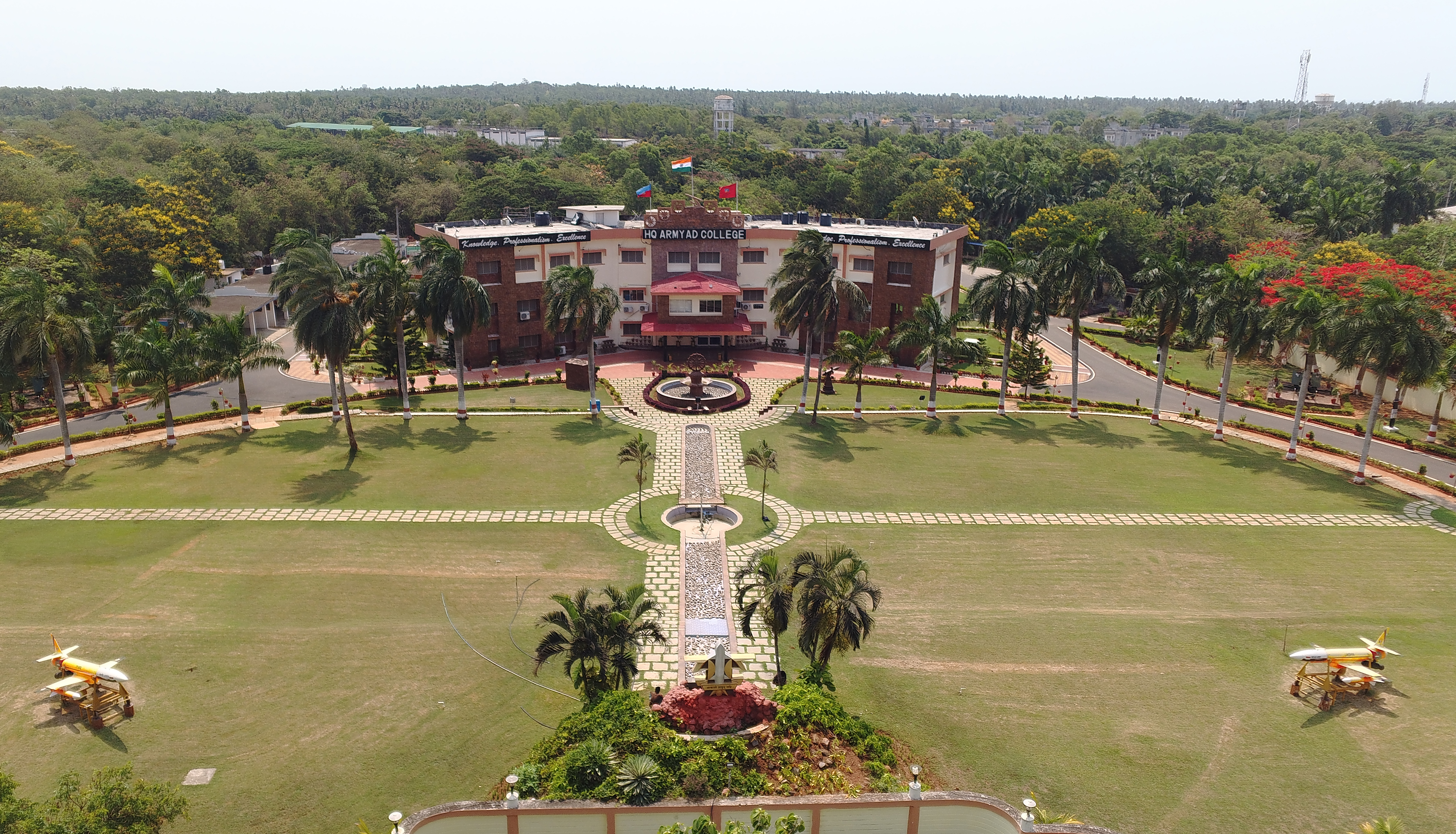
Army Air Defence College

The Army Air Defence College located at Gopalpur is a premier training institute of Indian Army. Army Air Defence College is devoted to training of all ranks in Leadership, Tactics & Weapons related to Air Defence in Indian Army .

== History ==
=== Pre-independence ===
In July 1940, government established training schools for anti-aircraft and coastal defence wings at Karachi. These schools predominantly trained the Indian personnel including commissioned, junior commissioned and non-commissioned officers in anti-aircraft warfare. Unlike the Coastal Artillery School (CAS), which was moved to Deolali, the anti-aircraft training school continued at Karachi till 1947.

=== Post-independence ===
Following the independence in August 1947, the training school was moved and merged into the air defence wing of School of Artillery in Deolali. Initially ten courses were proposed for training at different stages in anti-aircraft warfare.

In 1955, Due to lack of facilities and firing ranges available for firing of missiles and other air defence weapon systems, it was proposed to relocate the wing. After the approval of setting up the academy in the 3000 acres of land given by the Government of Orissa in 1968, the government authorized the establishment of Air Defence & Guided Missile School and Centre in 1979. On 1 November 1989, the Air Defence & Guided Missile School and Centre was formally inaugurated as a part of Gopalpur military cantonment.

After the bifurcation of 'Corps of Air Defence Artillery' (later Corps of Army Air Defence) from the Regiment of Artillery in 1994, the college was awarded autonomous status from 10 January 1994.

The 'Air Defence & Guided Missile School and Centre' was rechristened as 'Army Air Defence College' (AADC) in 1998. Later in 2008, the Army Air Defence Centre was also relocated to Army Air Defence College.

== Training Infrastructure ==
The college is equipped with latest state of the art training facilities to train air defence warrior like several types of simulators, class room variants (CRVs), working models of weapon, cut sections and actual parts of radars, guns, missile and air defence systems used by the corps. These include ZSU-23-4B "Shilka", Tunguska Gun Missile System, L/70 Gun Systems, Zu 23 mm gun systems, 9K33 OSA-AK and its variants and the ingeniously developed Akash and MRSAM surface-to-air missile. Besides these, the college holds a computer and electronic lab, combat simulator room, sand model room, EW labs, Akashteer command and control complexes etc. the college is also Centre of expertise (CoE) on C-UAS and EW non Comn aspect. Indoor training comlex is known as Takhshila and outdoor training area is Ashtrshala.

College has administrative facilities like Nalanda Library, an auditorium ( known as 'AIMA Auditorium'), Sibia sports complex, Army Environmental Park and Golf Course, Samudrika sea beach, Sagarika shopping complex, station sainik institute, officer mess, Dolphin officer institute, Unit Run Canteen and a lake for different aqua and sailing activities and adventure sports.

=== Gopalpur Seaward Firing Ranges ===
The college hosts a seaward firing range, known as Gopalpur seaward firing ranges with a range about 75 km, to conduct the air defence weapon firing and outdoor exercises. This range is also equipped with electro-optical tracking and assessment system for firing analysis and validation of all army air defence systems. The ingenuously developed pilot-less target aircraft: DRDO Lakshya, MEAT and Banshee is used as the target drone.

== Commandants ==
The Commandant of Army Air Defence College is the head of the college. The inaugural holder is Brig AS Sibia. Initially the position was held by a two-star general and later it was elevated to the rank of three-star general. The present commandant is Lt Gen U V Talur, AVSM VSM.

S.No	Rank	Name	Appointment date	Left office	Later served as the DG of Corps of Army Air Defence
1	Brig	AS Sibia	15 July 1989	22 Mar 1990	No
2	Maj Gen	Ram Pratap	23 Mar 1990	31 October 1991	No
3	Maj Gen	Y R Jetley, VSM	15 october 1991	31 October 1993	No
4	Maj Gen	Jagjeet Singh	1 November 1993	21 December 1995	No
5	Maj Gen	S P Malhotra, VSM	22 December 1995	30 September 1997	No
6	Maj Gen	Naresh Chand	1 October 1997	31 January 2001	Yes
7	Maj Gen	P K Saighal	2 February 2001	28 February 2002	No
8	Maj Gen	J S Mahil, AVSM	19 April 2002	7 June 2003	No
9	Maj Gen	R K Sudan, AVSM	23 June 2003	31 January 2006	No
10	Maj Gen	Ram Pratap, VSM	2 February 2006	4 July 2008	Yes
11	Maj Gen	V K Saxena, VSM	5 July 2008	18 September 2009	No
12	Lt Gen	Kuldip Singh, AVSM	1 December 2008	30 June 2011	Yes
13	Lt Gen	Dr V K Saxena, PVSM, AVSM, VSM	1 July 2011	30 June 2013	Yes
14	Lt Gen	Rajiv Bhatia, AVSM	1 July 2013	31 May 2015	Yes
15	Lt Gen	A K Sahgal, VSM, ADC	1 June 2015	31 December 2016	Yes
16	Lt Gen	P S Jaggi	30 January 2017	15 December 2017	Yes
17	Lt Gen	A P Singh, PhD	16 December 2017	23 January 2019	Yes
18	Lt Gen	Satinder Singh, AVSM	24 January 2019	31 July 2022	No
19	Lt Gen	U V Talur, AVSM, VSM	1 August 2022	25 June 2025	No
20	Lt Gen	R C Srikanth	25 June 2025	Till Date	No

== Awards (Since Raising) ==
1. AVSM-06, 2. VSM-03, 3. COAS COMMENDATION CARD-32, 4 GOC-in-C COMMENDATION CARD-324.
