= Centre for Artificial Intelligence and Robotics =

Research center in India

Centre for Artificial Intelligence & Robotics
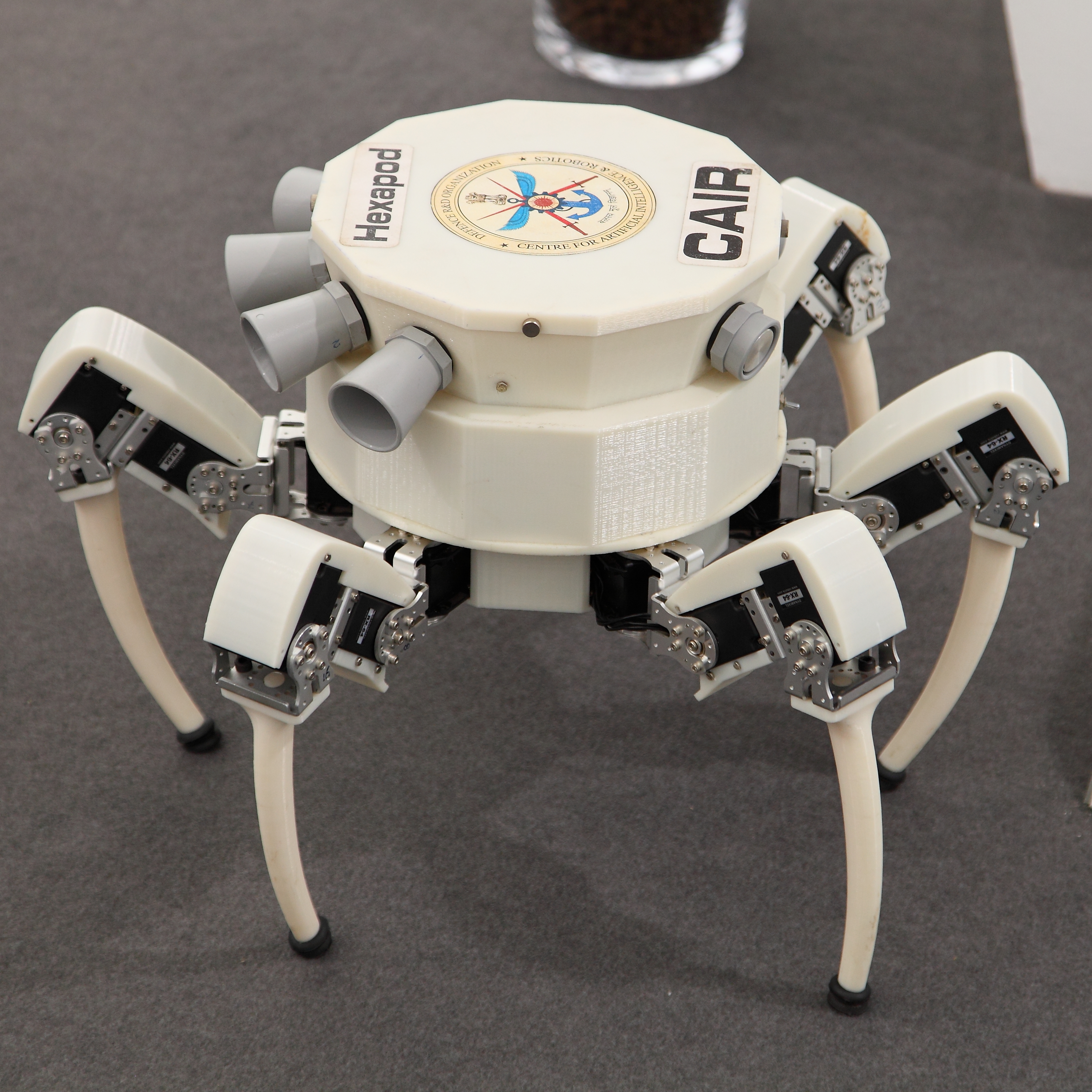
- A hexapod robot from CAIR
- Established: October 1986
- Director: Dr UK Singh
- Staff: 300, including 150 scientists
- Location: DRDO Complex, C.V. Raman Nagar, Bangalore-560 093, Bangalore, Karnataka
- Operating agency: DRDO
- Website: CAIR Home Page

The Centre for Artificial Intelligence and Robotics (CAIR) is a laboratory of the Defence Research & Development Organisation (DRDO). Located in Bangalore, Karnataka, involved in the research and development (R&D) of high quality secure communication, command and control, and intelligent systems. CAIR was founded by Arogyaswami Paulraj. CAIR is the primary laboratory for R&D in different areas of defence information and communication technology (ICT).

== History ==
CAIR was established in October 1986. Its research focus was initially in the areas of artificial intelligence (AI), robotics, and control systems. In November 2000, R&D groups working in the areas of command, control, communications & intelligence (C3I) systems, Communication and Networking, and communication secrecy in Electronics and Radar Development Establishment (LRDE) were merged with CAIR.

CAIR, which was operating from different campuses across Bangalore has now moved.

== Projects ==
- DRDO NETRA, software to intercept online communications.
- SecOS, Secure Operating System
- Muntra - unmanned ground vehicle manufactured at the Ordnance Factory Medak.

=== National Maritime Domain Awareness Programme ===
The first attempt towards a network-centric naval force was made in 1996 by Lieutenant Commander B.S. Ahluwalia, who was in charge of Indian naval missile boats. He created a sensor grid program called Sangharsh (lit. 'conflict/struggle'). After transforming the Indian Navy's operational capabilities, the software was later developed into a three-dimensional Trigun system for use across in the entire naval fleet. Following the 2008 Mumbai attacks, the Trigun's development accelerated along with the establishment of the National Command, Control, Communication, and Intelligence (NC3I) network, the Information Management and Analysis Center (NC3I node), the Mercantile Maritime Domain Awareness Center, and the Information Fusion Centre – Indian Ocean region under National Maritime Domain Awareness (NMDA) project.

As part of the initiative, CAIR collaborated with the Indian Navy to use data analytics and artificial intelligence in Trigun system for improved maritime awareness and mission planning. The objective is to perform real-time update of threat matrix and to inform the Indian naval assets about merchant ships, warships, submarines, and aircraft in the vicinity of their area of operation.

In 2012, the initial phase of implementation was successfully completed. The project execution phase-2, demonstrating the ability to identify any changes or forecast a future response pertaining to Indian naval defense, concluded in March 2020. In project execution phase-3, which stretched from 2020 to 2024, Trigun began filtering out data on the movements of aircraft, submarines, and warships of more than 20 years in December 2020. The Trigun project's most advanced and modern phase began when AI analytics started building an integrated common operational picture using the patterns and data that were received. The goal of the Trigun system is to improve battlefield transparency through the integration of high-speed data communication networks and enhanced net-centric warfare capabilities.

Trigun is capable of gathering information about a wide range of aircraft, submarines, military/commercial vessels, from civilian radars, space-based identification systems, and coastal surveillance radars. The data is gathered and complied in designated nodes for real-time maritime risk detection, assessment and response. Satellite relay is used to communicate the results and observations to Indian naval warships, submarines, and aircraft. The Trigun system is intended to assist the Indian Navy in improving situational awareness during the fog of war by bringing clarity to mission planning. When required, the Central Board of Indirect Taxes and Customs, intelligence services, port authorities, and the Indian Coast Guard can receive access to the data generated by Trigun. To improve monitoring in island territories, all naval sensors situated on mainland and island territories are being connected.

==== Indian Maritime Situational Awareness System ====
Minister of Defence Rajnath Singh unveiled the Indian Maritime Situational Awareness System (IMSAS) for Indian Navy on 18 December 2020. Maritime planning tools, analytical capabilities, and a global maritime situational picture are all provided by this indigenous, high-performance intelligent system. Naval Command and Control (C2) is made possible by the system, which sends the Maritime Operational Picture from Naval headquarters to every warship at sea. The IMSAS was envisioned and developed in collaboration between CAIR and the Indian Navy, and it is being implemented by Bharat Electronics.

=== INDIGIS-Enterprise ===
After receiving approval in 2007, CAIR conducted a technical demonstration for indigenous Geographic Information System. The development is due to the fact that commercial off-the-self GIS used in different Tactical Command, Control, Communications, and Information (TAC-C3I) systems, such as Artillery Combat Command and Control System, Battlefield Management System, and Command Information Decision Support System, have substantial license costs and restrictions, operate on their own national format rather than adhering to Indian military standards, and primarily operate on Microsoft Windows and Intel platforms, raising issues with national security and dependability. INDIGIS is available via more than 500 APIs and is compatible with Linux, Windows, and Android.

The INDIGIS kernel features 136 end-user military functions and is offered as an SDK with INDIGIS-Server, INDIGIS Web Client, INDIGIS Desktop, and INDIGIS Mobile App. Following the project's successful completion, the Indian Army and Indian Navy installed it to gather user input. The Indian Maritime Situational Awareness System, Anant Shastra, Akash-NG, Arjun MBT, Multistatic Radar System, DRDO AEW&CS, Pralay and other systems use it. The technology was initially given to Bharat Electronics in 2018, and it is currently being used in 15 distinct systems that are being produced. It is combined with satellite navigation, inertial navigation systems, radars, LiDAR, Sonars, and UAVs to gather data. In 2022, DRDO transferred the technology to MicroGenesis Techsoft, a private sector firm in Bengaluru.

== See also ==
- Mission Sudarshan Chakra - proposed multi-layer defense system for India
