= Uttar Pradesh Defence Industrial Corridor =

Defence corridor in Uttar Pradesh, India

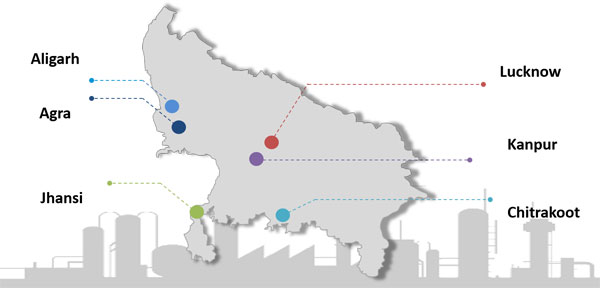
Location of Nodes of Uttar Pradesh Defence Industrial Corridor

The Uttar Pradesh Defence Industrial Corridor (UPDIC) or Defence Corridor is an initiative by the Government of India to promote self-reliance in defence manufacturing under the Make in India and Atmanirbhar Bharat campaigns. It was announced in 2018-2019 union budget by Prime Minister Narendra Modi. It aims to make Uttar Pradesh a major hub for aerospace, defence, and military equipment production.

The Uttar Pradesh Expressways Industrial Development Authority (UPEIDA) has been appointed as the lead agency to oversee the execution of this project in coordination with various state agencies. It has six nodes, such as Aligarh, Agra, Chitrakoot, Jhansi, Kanpur and Lucknow. As of June 2025, about ₹28,809 crore had been invested in the defence corridor by seven companies.

== DefExpo 2020 ==
23 MoUs worth Rs 50,000 crore were inked with the Government of Uttar Pradesh alone through the UPEIDA in the presence of Chief Minister Yogi Adityanath and Raksha Mantri Rajnath Singh.
