= Defence Research and Development Laboratory =

Child agency of DRDO

- Established: June 1961
- Location: Kanchanbagh; Hyderabad; 500058
- Operating agency: Defence Research and Development Organization

Defence Research and Development Laboratory (DRDL) is an Indian missile development laboratory, part of the Defence Research and Development Organization (DRDO). Their charter is centered on the design, development, and flight evaluation of various types of missile systems for the Indian armed forces.

== History ==
In 1958, the Indian government constituted a team of engineers, mostly from the Indian Ordnance Factories Service - called the Special Weapons Development Team - to research guided missile weapons development. It was founded by S. P. Chakravarti, the father of Electronics and Telecommunication engineering in India, who also founded the DLRL and the Electronics and Radar Development Establishment (LRDE). This team was later expanded into DRDL, a full-fledged laboratory, in June 1961, at the campus of Defence Science Centre, Delhi. It later shifted to Hyderabad after the state government granted them the former Nizam's army barracks. This was the genesis of the Defence Research and Development Laboratory (DRDL), under the Defence Research and Development Organisation (DRDO).

=== Vision and mission ===
Being a design and development house for missile-based weapon systems needed for tactical applications across multiple platforms is the organization's objective. Its aim is to create the cutting-edge technology and infrastructure needed for various class of missiles. Give the production agency the required technology for the guided missiles manufacturing.

The DRDO launched Project Devil and Project Valiant to reverse engineer Soviet-origin guided missiles and create intercontinental ballistic missiles, respectively, which prompted the DRDL to begin developing missile guidance systems. Although both initiatives were abandoned before they were successful, the work completed aided DRDL in increasing its capacity. Afterwards, this assisted DRDL in leading the Integrated Guided Missiles Development Program (IGMDP). By 2011, India started producing cutting-edge components in-house and was fully independent in end-to-end missile development.

== Products ==
Weapon systems developed by DRDL include:-

- Akash surface-to-air missile
- Astra air-to-air missile
- Nag anti-tank guided missile
- QRSAM surface-to-air missile

=== Hypersonic technology ===
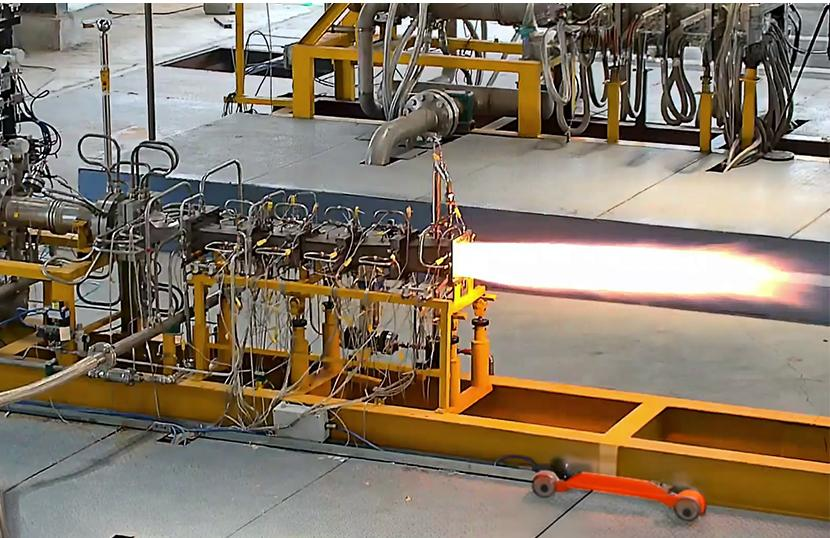
Active Cooled Scramjet Subscale Combustor ground testing in April 2025

The DRDL has developed multiple technologies for an Active Cooled Scramjet Combustor under the Hypersonic Cruise Missile Development Programme with the Department of Science and Technology and the private sector. The technologies include an improved ceramic thermal barrier coating (TBC), endothermic scramjet fuel, and a long-duration scramjet engine. A novel flame stabilization method was added to the scramjet combustor, which maintains a constant flame inside the combustor at air speeds greater than 1.5 km/s (5,400 km/h). In addition to improving cooling, the endothermic fuel shortens ignition times. With its high temperature resistance, the cutting-edge ceramic TBC can function above the melting point of steel. The Scramjet Connect Pipe Test (SCPT) Facility in Hyderabad to validate the technology was also designed and developed by the DRDL and the industry.

A 120-second ground test of an Active Cooled Scramjet Subscale Combustor for next-generation missiles was conducted by the DRDL at its SCPT facility on 21 January 2025. The test showed stable combustion and successful ignition. The second test of the subscale scramjet was conducted on 25 April 2025 for a longer duration of over 1,000 seconds in the Hyderabad facility. This validated the system's worthiness for a full scale flight worthy combustor testing.

The full scale actively cooled long duration Scramjet Engine was first tested on 9 January 2026 for a runtime of over 12 minutes or 700 seconds. The second test of the full-scale combustor was conducted on 9 May 2026 at the same facility for a duration of 1,200 seconds.

== Facility ==
=== Advanced Weapon System Complex ===
On 12 June 2026, Defense Minister Rajnath Singh formally inaugurated the Advanced Weapon System Complex at DRDL. It is anticipated that the facility will aid in the development of next-generation weapons, boosting India's aspirations to achieve strategic autonomy in vital defense technology.
