= Research Centre Imarat =

Missile research facility in Hyderabad, India

Research Center Imarat
- Research type: Defence
- Field of research: Integrated Guided Missile Development Programme
- Director: Anindya Biswas, Sc-H
- Location: Hyderabad, Telangana, India
- Operating agency: DRDO

Research Centre Imarat (RCI) is a Defence Research and Development Organisation laboratory located in Hyderabad, Telangana. The lab is responsible for research and development of missile systems, guided weapons and advanced avionics for the Indian Armed Forces. It was established by APJ Abdul Kalam in 1988. It is currently headed by Anindya Biswas, who was appointed as the Director of RCI with effect from July 1, 2023.

== Background and projects ==
The Research Centre Imarat (RCI) is a global frontrunner in developing avionics and navigation systems for missiles. RCI is the leading laboratory which has successfully spearheaded the Indo-Israel joint development programme Barak 8, also called MR-SAM, and had hat-trick success in its first three consecutive missions. RCI, in collaboration with sister DRDO laboratories, developed the Very Short Range Air Defence System (VSHORAD).
