= Corps of Army Air Defence =

Air defence arm of the Indian Army

- Regimental crest
- Active: 1939 – present day
- Country: British India (1939-1947); India (1947-present)
- Allegiance: Republic of India
- Branch: Indian Army
- Type: Army Corps
- Role: Air Defence Warfare
- Size: Around 85,000 soldiers and 6,000 officers.
- Part of: Indian Army
- Mottos: Sanskrit: आकाशे शत्रुन् जहि English: Annihilate the Airborne Enemy
- Regimental colors: Sky blue & Red
- Anniversaries: January 10
- Engagements: World War II; 1947 Indo-Pakistani War; Sino-Indian War of 1962; Indo-Pak War of 1965; Indo-Pak War of 1971; Kargil War
- Website: Indian Army Official Site

Commanders
- Director General of Corps of Army Air Defence: Lieutenant General Sumer Ivan D’Cunha

Insignia
- Regimental flag

The Corps of Army Air Defence (abbreviated as AAD), is an active corps of the Indian Army and a major combat support arm tasked with air defence of the country from foreign threats. The AAD is responsible for the protection of Indian air space from enemy aircraft and missiles, especially below 5,000 feet.

The history of the AAD dates back to 1939 during the times of the British Raj in India. The corps actively took part in the Second World War fighting on behalf of the British Empire. Post independence, the corps has participated in all the wars involving India, starting from the 1947 Indo-Pakistani War to the 1999 Kargil conflict.

The corps enjoyed autonomous status from 1994, after the bifurcation of the Corps of Air Defence Artillery from the Army's Regiment of Artillery. A separate training school, the Army Air Defence College (AADC), was established to train its personnel.

As of 2026, the Indian Army is responsible for the tracking and monitoring of flying objects at a range of 35 km (22 mi) and up to an altitude of 3 km (9,800 ft) beyond the Northern and Western borders. Several air command and control centres are being established along the borders. These centres will coordinate 97% of the friendly drone and aircraft activities in the 35×3 km envelope.

== History and origin ==
=== Pre-independence ===
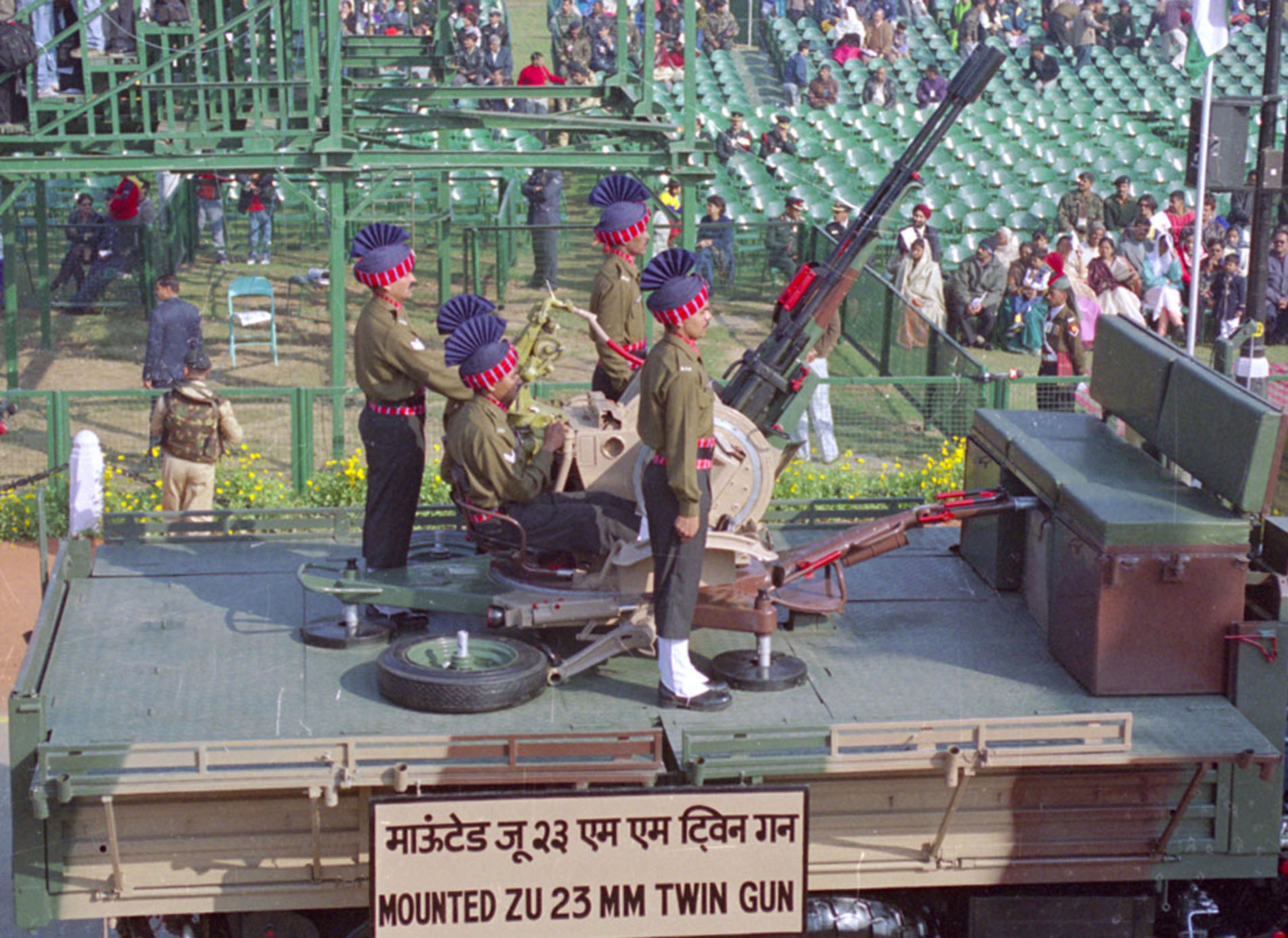
Mounted ZU 23 MM Twin Gun

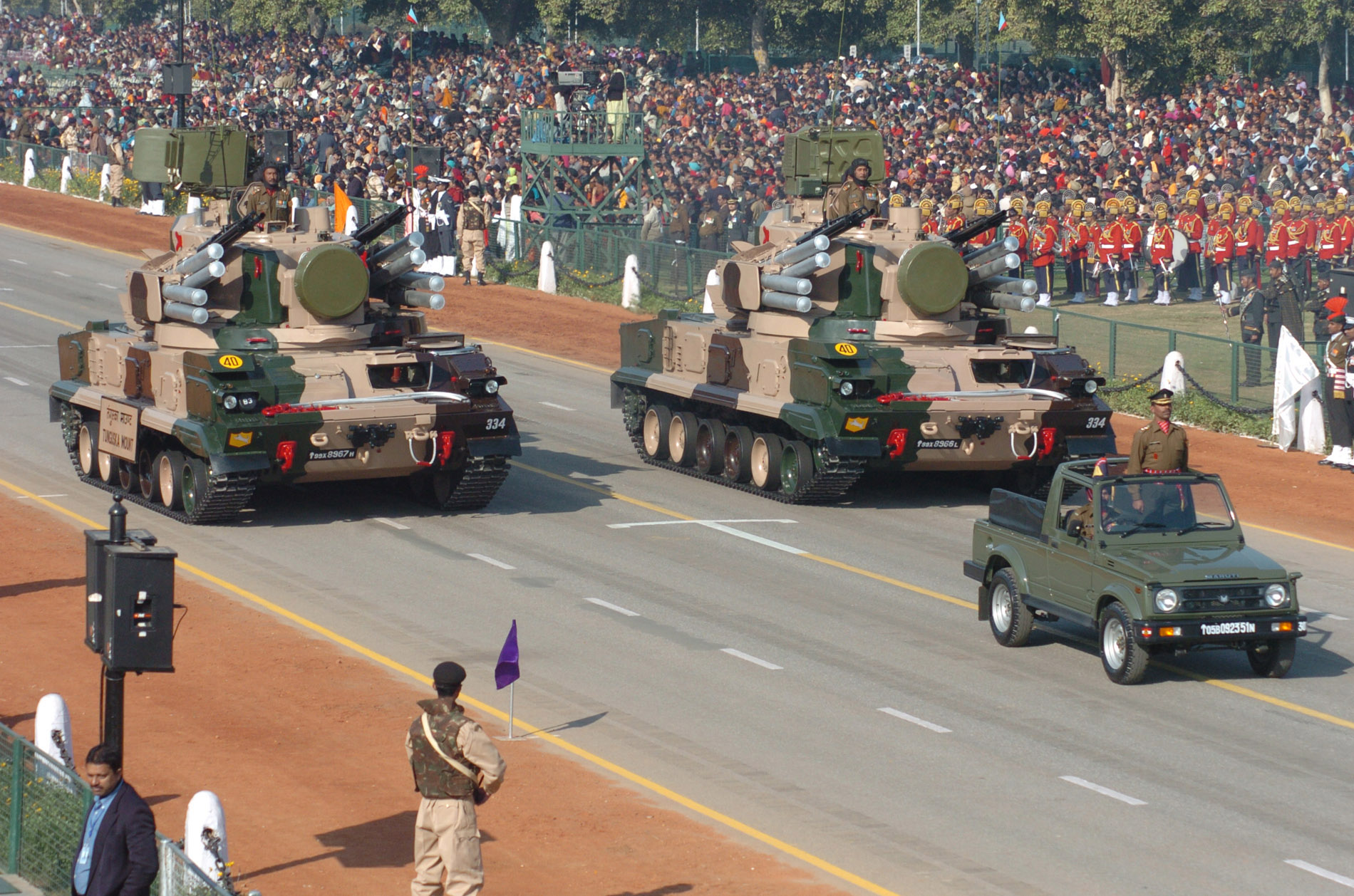
Tunguska Mount System

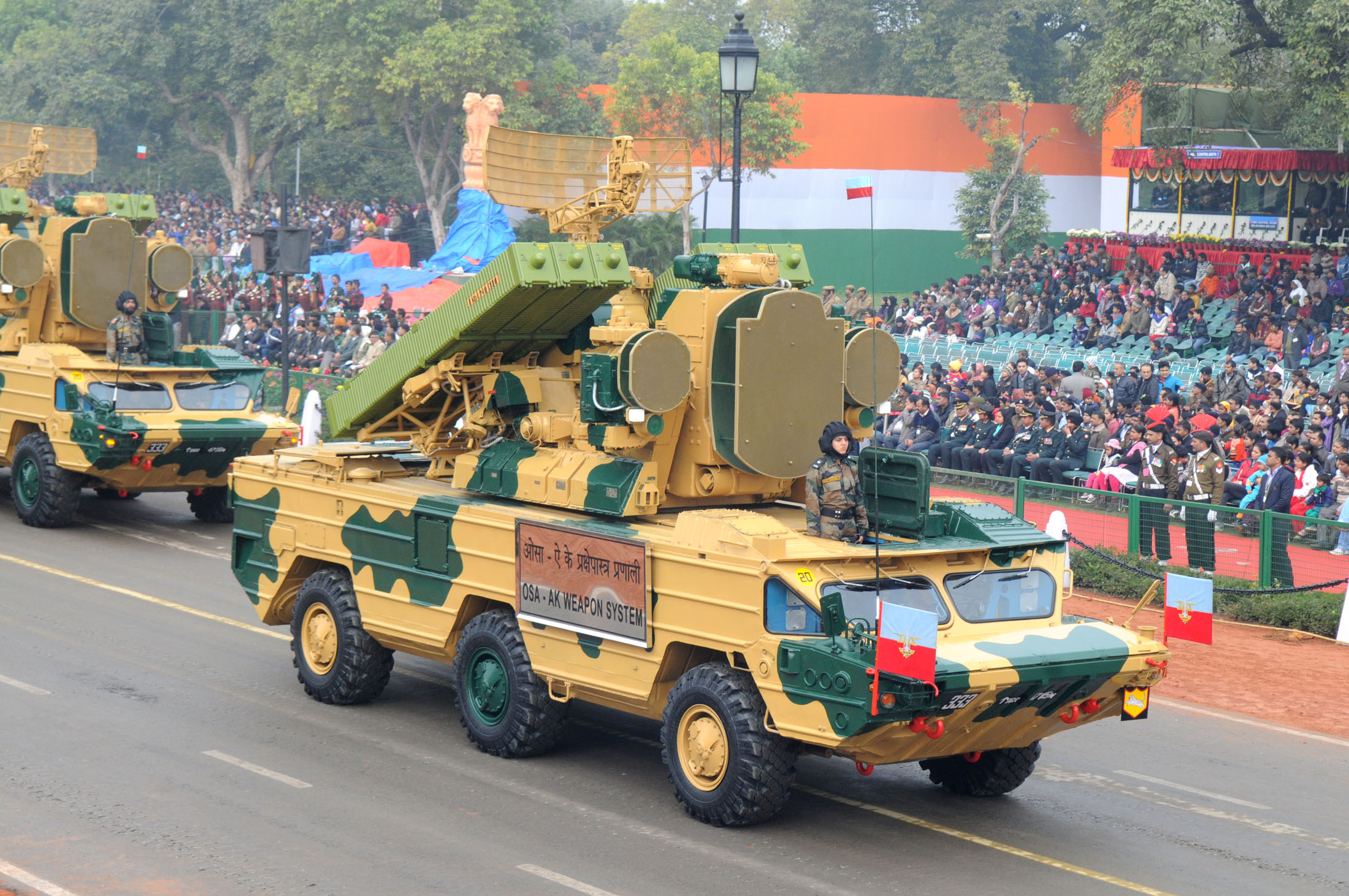
OSA- AK Weapon System

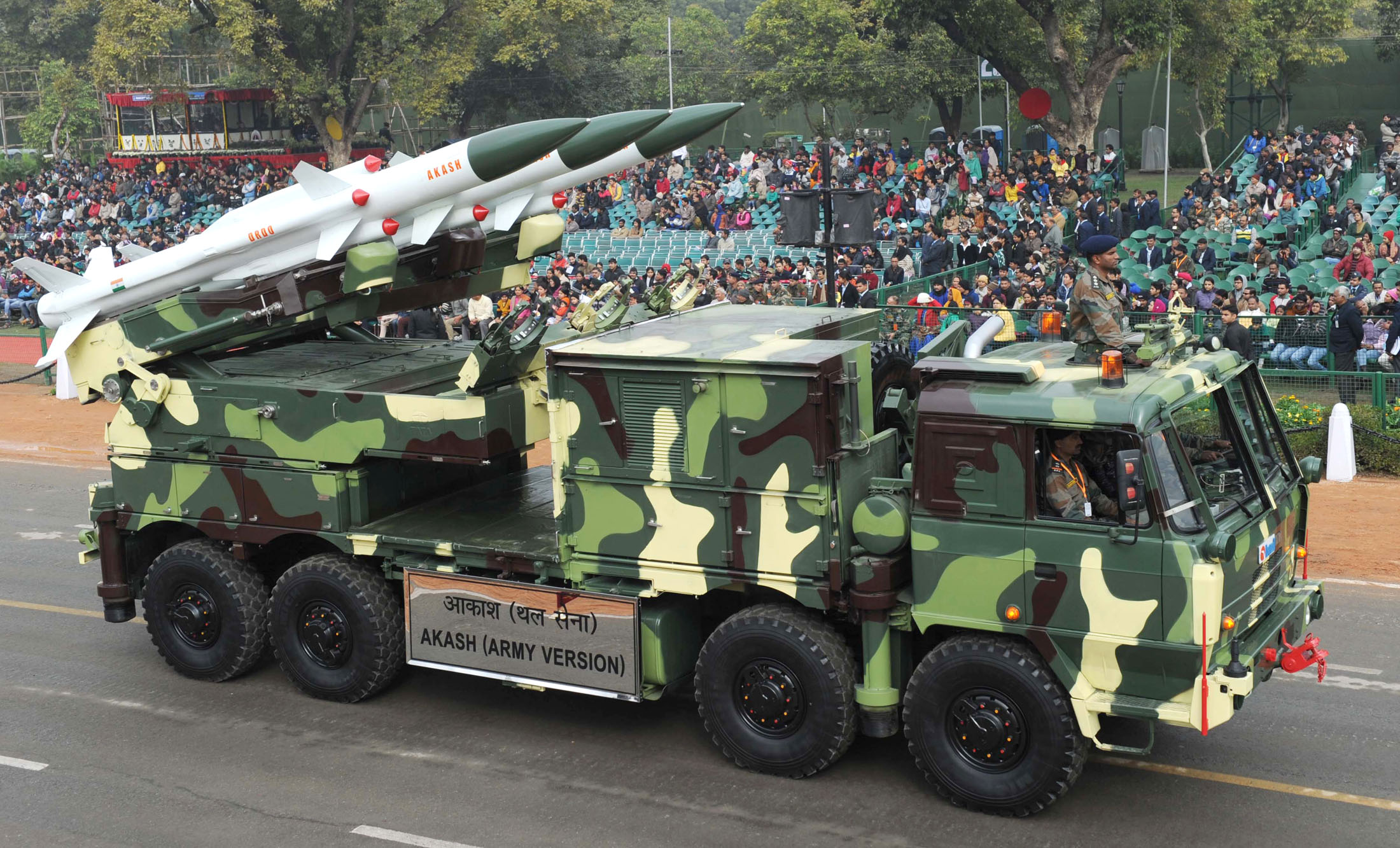
Akash surface to air missile

Air Defence Artillery in India was first established by the British Government ruling India in 1939, at the start of World War II to counter the growing aerial threat from the Axis powers, especially from the Japanese in East Asia. A small number of Indian troops were initially trained to use 3-inch Ack-Ack guns and in the later stages of the conflict to operate Bofors 40 mm L/60 guns. The trained troops formed part of the anti-aircraft batteries of the Hong Kong and Singapore Royal Artillery (HKSRA) to counter the Japanese air threat in South-East Asia. They were also assigned to Indian artillery formations. In the early 1940s, several anti-aircraft units and training establishments were established throughout the country with Indian personnel being posted into these establishments from the infantry and artillery regiments.

By 1942, the air defence branch had grown considerably with eighteen operational anti-aircraft regiments, of which nine were Heavy Anti Aircraft regiments and nine were Light Anti Aircraft regiments. Besides the four brigades that were exclusively undertaking air defence tasks, one independent Heavy Anti Aircraft battery and two independent Light Anti Aircraftbatteries were also in existence, with two training centres established to train the personnel in anti-aircraft warfare. By the end of 1944, this had reached a total of thirty three air defence artillery units. However, after actively taking part in the second world war on behalf of the British Empire, many of these were disbanded.

=== Post-independence ===
In October 1993, the Army Staff made a decision to remove all air defense units from the Indian Army Regiment of Artillery. The regiment had been recommended to bifurcate to remove all the AAA and aerospace missile defence formations so that on their basis a new service branch would be created to focus on air defence artillery. With the separation of the air defense from the Regiment, the Corps of Air Defence Artillery came into existence on 10 January 1994. The headquarters of the corps, the Directorate General of Air Defence Artillery, came into force the same day. Subsequently, the air defence wings and branches of the artillery present at various command headquarters throughout the country were bifurcated into the corps from the respective artillery units and regiments. Autonomous status was awarded to the Air Defence Guided Missile School at Gopalpur and the Air Defence Wing of the Artillery Centre, Nasik Road Camp was inducted into the Air Defence Guided Missile Centre. The day on which the Corps of Air Defence Artillery emerged as an autonomous corps of the Indian Army, 10 January, is celebrated as the raising day annually at air defence centers throughout the country.

The Air Defence & Guided Missile School and Centre and the Corps of Air Defence Artillery were rechristened as the Army Air Defence College (AADC) and the Corps of Army Air Defence in 1998 and April 2005 respectively.

== Current overview ==
=== Band ===
The regimental military band was raised in 1995 at the AAD Centre. To date, it takes part in various national and international functions. Its string ensemble the "Celestial Sentinels", was raised in November 2001. A pipe band is maintained by Army Air Defence College in Gopalpur.

== Regimental insignia ==
=== Regimental crest ===
The Mukherjee Committee assigned the task of the designing the regimental crest to the National Institute of Design (NID), at Ahmedabad. After a series of reviews, modifications and improvements, finally the crest designed by Vijay Singh was adopted.

The crest depicts the neo-facet of the corps. It portrays a missile in silver tint, with radar antennae in gold colour fixed on the either side. At the bottom, the motto "आकाशे शत्रुन् जहि" in English "Akashe Shatrun Jahi" is imprinted.

=== Regimental motto ===
The sentence "आकाशे शत्रुन् जहि" (Akashe Shatrun Jahi) of Devanagari script, which means "Kill the Enemy in the Sky" was adopted as the regimental motto in 1996.

== Director Generals ==
The office of Director General of Corps of Army Air Defence serves as the general headquarters to the corps. The position was first created when the Corps of Army Air Defence was split from the Regiment of Artillery on 10 January 1994. The post is generally held by a three-star general. It was first held by Lieutenant General PK Pahwa. Individual AAD Brigades, Regiments and Battalions come under operational command and control of the Army Corps, Divisions and Brigades that they are a part of.

List of Previous Directors General of Corps of Army Air Defence
S.No	Rank	Name	Appointment date	Left office
1	Lt Gen	PK Pahwa, PVSM	10 January 1994	31 October 1996
2	Lt Gen	A Mukherjee, PVSM, AVSM	1 November 1996	31 January 2001
3	Lt Gen	Naresh Chand, PVSM	10 February 2001	31 Aug 2003
4	Lt Gen	CS Chima, PVSM	1 September 2003	31 December 2005
5	Lt Gen	KS Dogra, PVSM, AVSM**, VSM	1 January 2006	30 November 2008
6	Lt Gen	Ram Pratap, PVSM, AVSM, VSM	1 December 2008	30 June 2011
7	Lt Gen	Kuldip Singh, PVSM, AVSM	1 July 2011	30 June 2013
8	Lt Gen	VK Saxena, PVSM, AVSM, VSM	1 July 2013	31 May 2015
9	Lt Gen	Rajiv Bhatia, AVSM	1 June 2015	31 December 2016
10	Lt Gen	AK Sahgal, AVSM, VSM	1 January 2017	31 December 2017
11	Lt Gen	PS Jaggi, AVSM	1 January 2018	8 April 2018
12	Lt Gen	AP Singh, AVSM	11 May 2018	30 June 2021
13	Lt Gen	Sunil Puri Goswami, AVSM, VSM	01 July 2021	30 October 2023
14	Lt Gen	Sumer Ivan D’Cunha	31 October 2023	

== President’s Colours ==
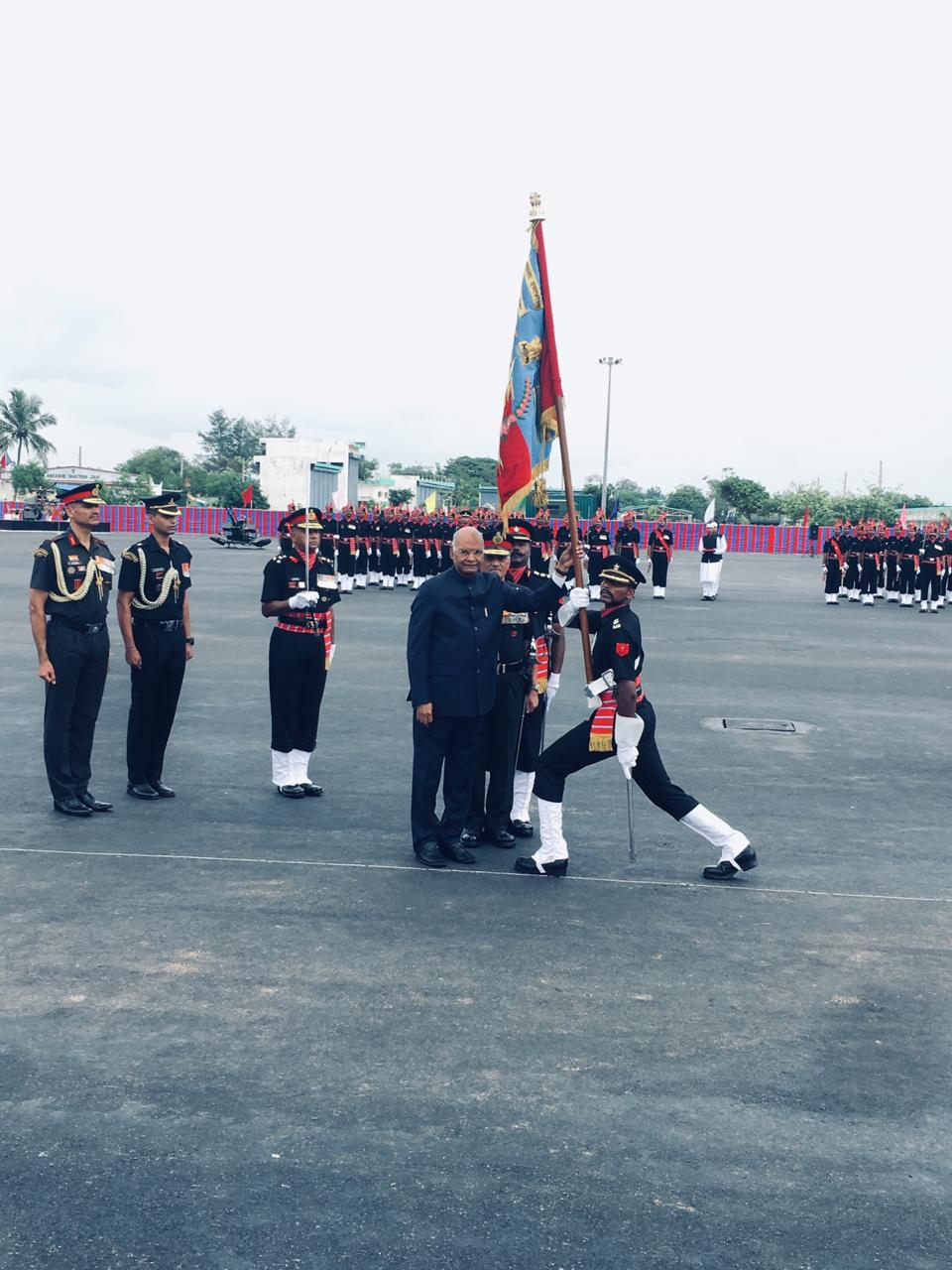
President of India, Mr Ram Nath Kovind awards 'Colours' to Corps of Army Air Defence

The President of India Mr Ram Nath Kovind awarded the President’s Colours to the Corps of Army Air Defence at Gopalpur Military Station on 28 September 2019 on completion of 25 years as an independent arm.

== See also ==
- Indian National Defence University
- Military Academies in India
- Sainik school
