= Akash-NG =

Indian surface to air missile series

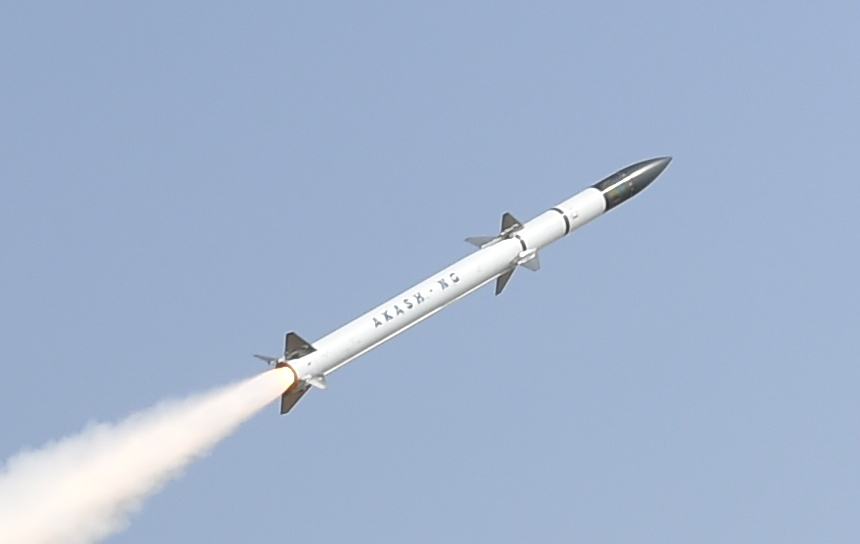
- Akash-NG Missile
- Type: Medium-range surface-to-air missile system
- Place of origin: India

Service history
- Used by: Indian Army; Indian Air Force

Production history
- Designer: Defence Research and Development Organisation
- Designed: 2021
- Manufacturer: Bharat Dynamics Limited; Bharat Electronics; Electropneumatics and Hydraulics India
- Developed from: Akash missile system

Specifications
- Mass: 350 kg (770 lb)
- Rate of fire: Normal: 1 missile in 10 seconds; Salvo: 3 missiles in 20 seconds
- Warhead: Fragmentation
- Detonation mechanism: Optical proximity fuze
- Engine: Dual-pulse solid rocket motor
- Propellant: Solid fuel
- Operational range: 50 km (31 miles)
- Flight ceiling: 18 km (59,000 ft)
- Flight altitude: 0.030–14 km (98–45,932 ft)
- Maximum speed: Mach 3
- Guidance system: Mid-course: INS + two-way datalink Terminal: ARH

Akash - New Generation (IAST: Ākāśa "Sky") abbreviated as Akash-NG is a medium-ranged, mobile surface-to-air missile defense system developed by the Defence Research and Development Organisation and produced by Bharat Dynamics Limited, and Bharat Electronics for the Indian Air Force.

For the Akash-NG project, DRDO selected Electropneumatics and Hydraulics India, a private company, under Development cum Production Partner programme. Akash-NG is the successor of Akash Mark 1, and Akash Prime series of missiles with improvements.

== Description ==
With a canisterised launcher and a significantly reduced ground system footprint than the previous generation Akash SAM system, Akash-NG has been created for greater deployability. An Akash-NG missile system includes three vehicle types — radar unit, command and control unit (CCU) and the launcher unit with six missile canisters. In September 2016, approval was given for the development of the Akash-NG (New Generation), with funding of ₹470 crore (equivalent to ₹737 crore or US$79 million in 2026).

Akash-NG will be more resilient to saturation attacks and have a quicker reaction time. The second stage's dual-pulse solid rocket motor is lighter than the air-breathing ramjet engine found in the earlier generation Akash and Akash-1S missiles. It assists in lessening the platform's weight and footprint. The missile's effectiveness against targets with low radar cross-section is enhanced by an AESA Multi-Function Radar and an electro-optical targeting system. The radar can detect over 100 targets and engage 10 targets simultaneously. It's optical proximity fuze offers superior anti-electromagnetic interference capabilities.

According to Electropneumatics and Hydraulics India, the Akash-NG launcher can function at elevations between 20° and 70° and at 360° azimuth. The deployment time from transportation to ready-to-fire mode is less than 20 minutes. It takes ten minutes to reload two stacks of canisterised missiles.

The missile uses an Ku-band active radar seeker which was revealed to the public during Aero India 2021. The multi-function radar can identify friends or foes, provide fire control up to 80 km (50 mi) and surveillance up to 120 km (75 mi). The EOTS can identify and track targets up to 45 km (28 mi) away. Akash-NG has extensive electronic counter-countermeasures capabilities. The weapon system is capable of operating in all weather condition. It is transportable by road, rail, and air.

Firstly, the radar of the missile system detects a target in surveillance mode and transfers the target details to the command and control unit (CCU). Thereafter, once the target enters the kill zone of the missile, the CCU sends the fire command to the launcher unit. A missile is fired within 10 seconds of target designation. A salvo of three missiles can be fired in twenty seconds. In ripple mode, multiple missiles can be launched from multiple launchers at once.

The missile has two sets of fins. The ones in the rear helps the missile to manoeuver while the forward ones are static and maintains lift force. The missile's warhead fragments achieve a speed of 1,500 m/s, enough for defeating thick armour plates at considerable distance and destroying aircraft, according to DRDO officials.

The previous generations of Akash missiles, including Akash Prime for higher altitudes, had a range of 25 km (16 mi). Meanwhile, Akash-NG has a maximum range of 30 km (19 mi) which has been proven in user trials with the Indian Air Force. However, in January 2026, DRDO officials revealed that a new rocket motor has been developed which further increases the missile's range to 50 km (31 mi). As per Janes Information Services, the range of interception is as high as 50–60 km (31–37 mi). The first domestically produced radio frequency seeker for Akash-NG was supplied by Bharat Dynamics Limited on 2 August 2023.

Following extensive testing in December 2025, the missile launcher, which was developed by MAK Controls and Systems, a Coimbatore-based company, was approved for Akash-NG.

== Testing ==
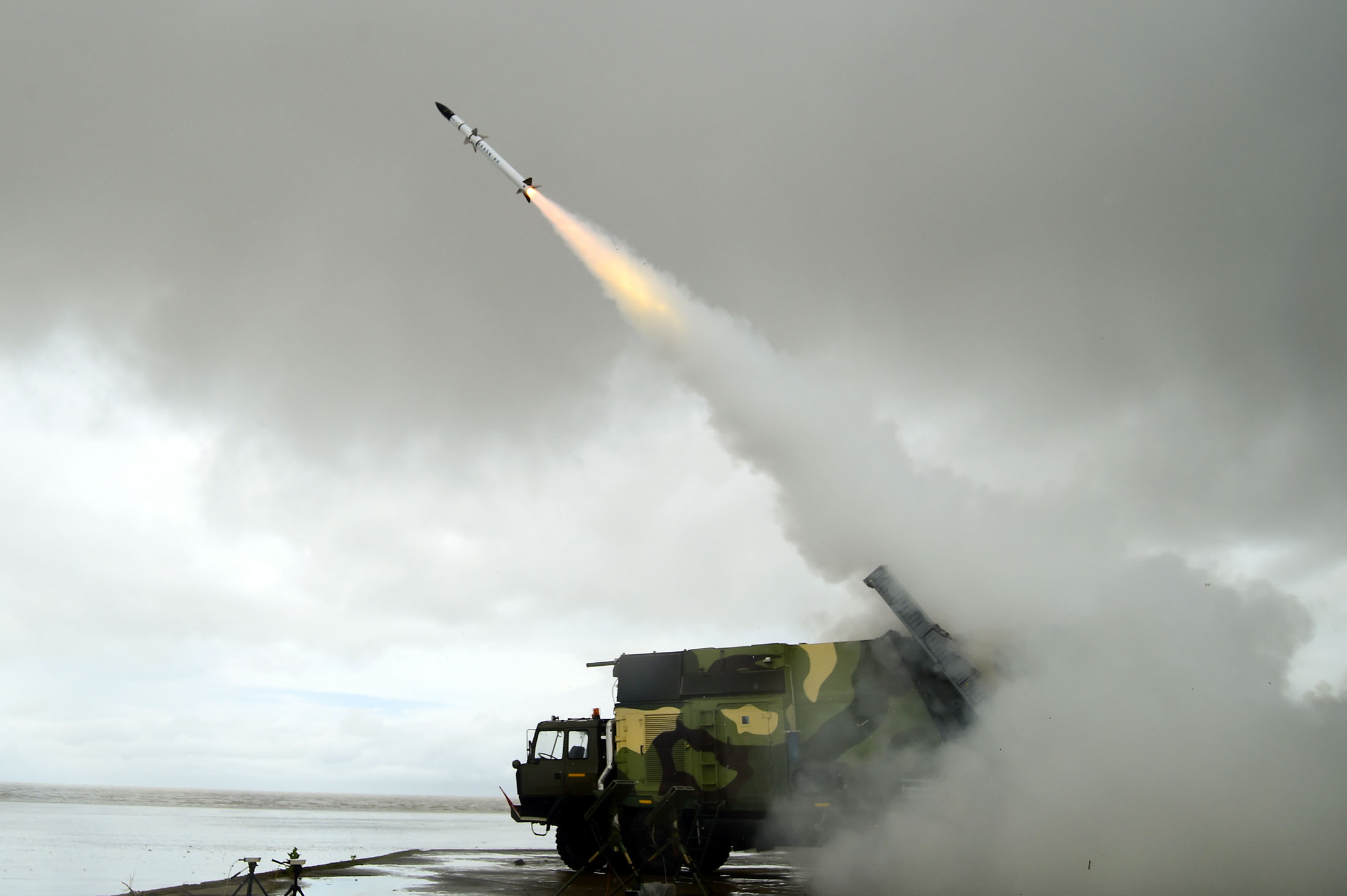
Akash-NG test on 23 July 2021 amid adverse weather

- On 25 January 2021, at around 2:30 pm, the Defence Research and Development Organisation successfully carried out the missile's maiden test against an electronic target from Launch Complex-III (LC-3) at the Integrated Test Range near Chandipur, Odisha. The launch accomplished all test objectives by executing high-altitude maneuvers throughout its trajectory. During the trial, the effectiveness of the missile's aerodynamic configuration, onboard avionics, and Command and Control system were all successfully validated in the presence of IAF representatives. Production agencies including Bharat Electronics, and Bharat Dynamics Limited participated in the trials.
- On 21 July 2021, at approximately 12:45 p.m., the DRDO successfully carried out the missile's second test against an electronic target from LC-3 at the ITR. The missile proved to have the high maneuverability needed to neutralize swift and agile airborne threats throughout the test. The test included the entire Akash NG Weapon System including the Launcher, Multi-Function Radar and Command, Control & Communication system. The systems were operated by BEL and BDL and the trial was observed by an IAF team.
- On 23 July 2021, at 11:45 am, DRDO successfully tested the Akash-NG from LC-3 at the ITR. The missile, equipped with an indigenous RF seeker, intercepted a high-speed unmanned aerial target. The test conducted in challenging weather conditions demonstrated the weapon system's all-weather capability. The entire weapon system was deployed and validated during the test.
- Akash-NG was successfully flight tested against Meggitt Banshee from the Integrated Test Range in January, February, and November of 2023 with the goal of intercepting highly maneuverable, low radar cross section aerial threats.

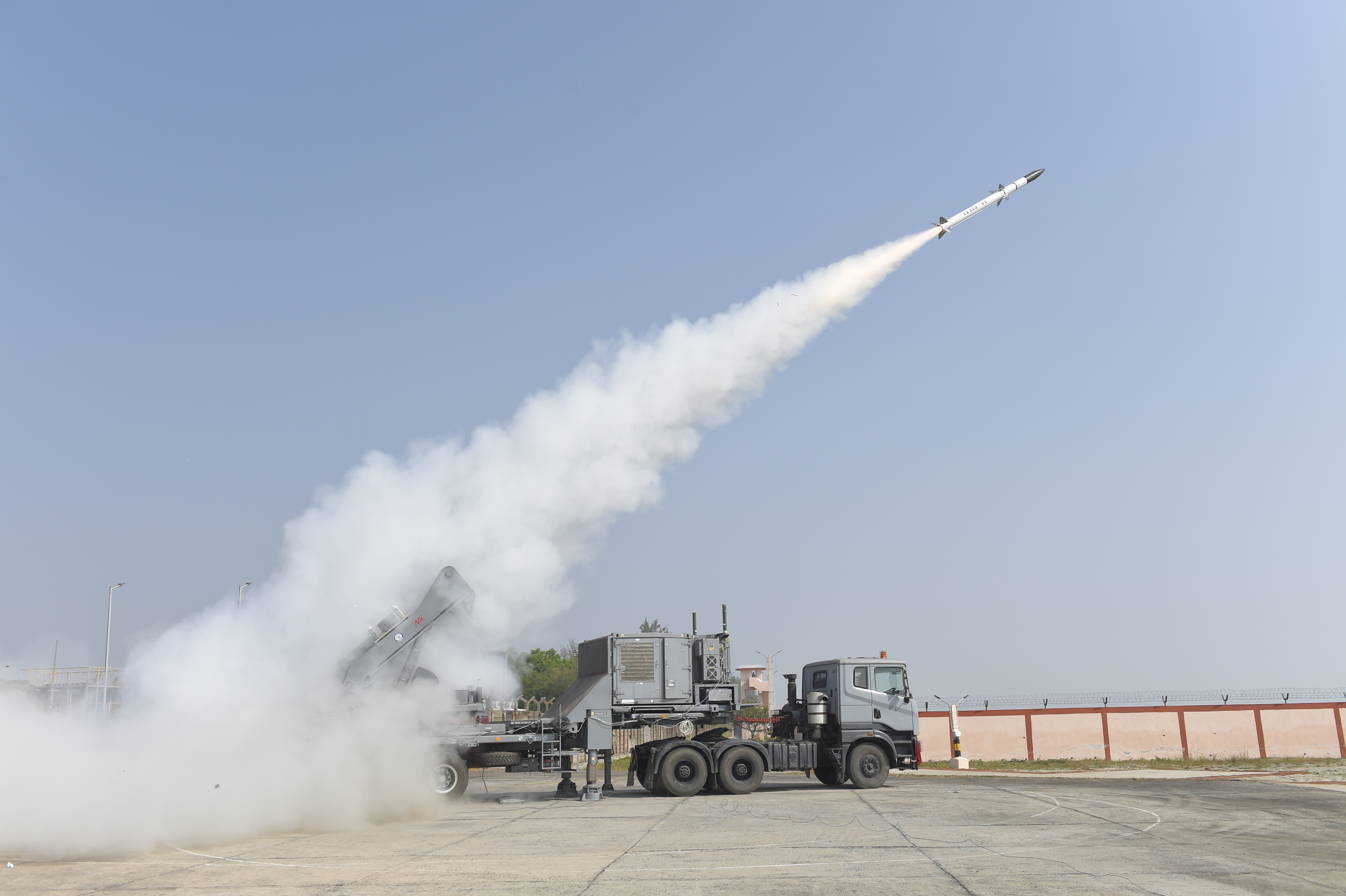
Akash-NG test fired from an IAF launcher against a fast-moving, low-altitude UAV in 2024

- The Akash-NG was successfully tested by DRDO on 12 January 2024, in flight against a swiftly moving unmanned aerial vehicle at a very low altitude. The target's successful interception and annihilation confirmed that the entire weapon system was operating as intended. Akash-NG is now ready for user trials.
- During the user trials of the Akash-NG, an EOTS mission was conducted in June 2025. As part of the tests, the missile was fired from Chandipur test range based on inputs from an electro-optical tracking system. The target, a high-speed maneuvering Banshee, was successfully engaged. The validation allows the EOTS to function as a complement as well as a replacement to the radar systems since the latter is vulnerable to anti-radiation missile and cruise missile. The new generation-EOTS, developed by IRDE, will function as a passive missile guidance.
- On 23 December 2025, Akash-NG completed its final user evaluation trials (UET) and is ready for induction into the Indian Armed Forces. During the trials, the missile intercepted aerial targets at various heights and ranges including near boundary, low altitude, long range and high altitude scenarios. The user trials was witnessed by officials from DRDO and the Indian Air Force. The missile's accuracy, response, and consistency in a range of operational envelopes have been proven through these engagements.

== Export ==
=== Brazil ===
In August 2024, the Brazilian and Indian specialized media reported an ongoing negotiation between the Brazilian military and DRDO for a Akash-NG deal within the Brazilian Army's medium and long range surface-to-air missile program. A Brazilian delegation is set to visit India in August to discuss the deal. As of 7 July 2025, the negotiations between the Brazilian Army and Akash-NG fabricants is paralyzed in favour of an ongoing negotiation between the Army and MBDA, for the supply of the Enhanced Modular Air Defence Solutions medium range SAM system, in a contract valued at US$1 billion (R$5 billion).

== Operators ==
India

- Indian Air Force — Planned

== See also ==
- Type 3 Chū-SAM – (Japan)
- KS-1 – (China)
- NASAMS – (Norway, United States)
- Barak 8 – (India, Israel)
- Anant Shastra – (India)
- VL-SRSAM – (India)
- Advanced Air Defence – (India)
- Prithvi Air Defence – (India)
- Project Kusha – (India)
