= Barak 8 =

Barak 8 / LR-SAM / MR-SAM
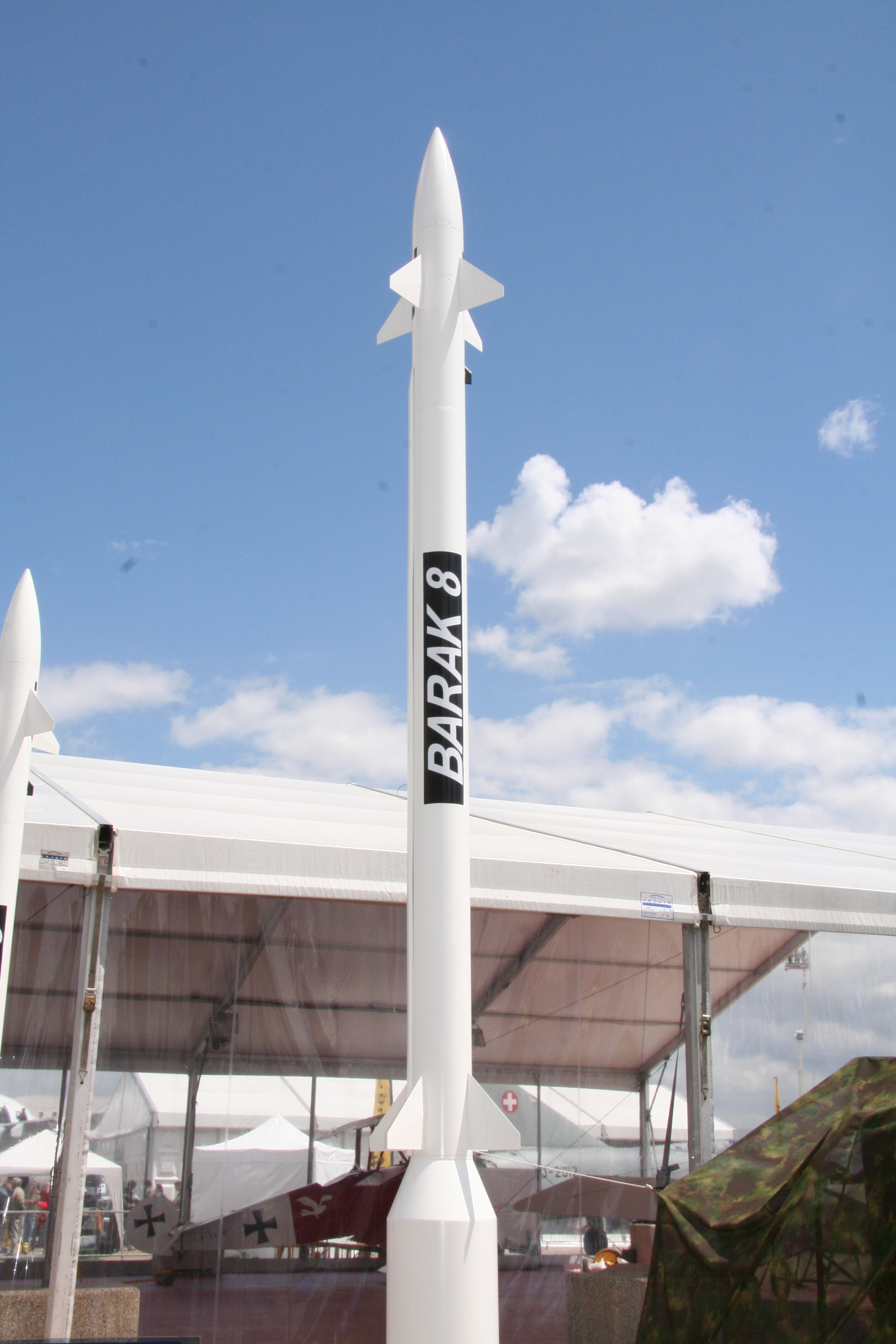
- Scale-model of the Barak-8ER concept unveiled at the 2009 Paris Air Show. Visible below is the addition of a large diameter 1st stage booster.
- Type: Medium to long-range surface-to-air missile
- Place of origin: India; Israel

Service history
- In service: 2016−present
- Used by: Indian Navy; Indian Air Force; Indian Army; Israeli Navy; United Arab Emirates Army; Azerbaijan Air Force

Production history
- Designer: Israel Aerospace Industries; Defence Research and Development Organisation
- Manufacturer: Bharat Dynamics Limited; Bharat Electronics; Rafael Advanced Defense Systems; Kalyani Rafael Advanced Systems
- Developed into: Barak MX
- Produced: 2017−present

Specifications
- Mass: 275 kg (606 lb) (w/out booster)
- Length: 4.5 m (180 in) (w/out booster)
- Diameter: 0.225 m (8.9 in) at main missile body; 0.54 m (1 ft 9 in) booster stage of Barak-8ER
- Wingspan: 0.94 m (3 ft 1 in)
- Warhead: 60 kg
- Detonation mechanism: Hard kill
- Engine: Smokeless dual pulsed rocket motor; 1-stage or 2-stage rocket variants
- Operational range: 0.5 km-100 km (single stage rocket) version: Barak-8 LRSAM; 0.5 km-150 km (2-stage rocket) version: Barak ER
- Flight ceiling: 16 km (9.9 mi); 20 km (12 mi): Barak LRAD & MRAD; 30 km (19 mi) Barak ER
- Maximum speed: Mach 2 (LRSAM variant); Mach 3 (MRSAM variant)
- Guidance system: 2-way datalink w/ WCS; Active radar homing
- Launch platform: 8 cell VLS module; 8 cell Dual-stacked land launcher

Barak 8 (Hebrew: בָּרָק, lit. "Lightning"), also known as LR-SAM or MR-SAM, is an Indian-Israeli jointly developed surface-to-air missile (SAM) system, designed to defend against any type of airborne threat including aircraft, helicopters, anti-ship missiles, and UAVs as well as ballistic missiles, cruise missiles and combat jets. Both maritime and land-based variants of the system exist.

Barak 8 was jointly developed by India's Defence Research & Development Organisation (DRDO) and Israel Aerospace Industries (IAI). It is produced by Israel's Directorate of Research and Development (DDR&D), Elta Systems, Rafael Advanced Defense Systems and India's Bharat Dynamics limited (BDL), Kalyani Rafael Advanced Systems (KRAS) and Tata Advanced Systems (TASL).

== Background ==
Barak 8 is loosely based on the original Barak 1 missile and is expected to feature a more advanced seeker, alongside range extensions that will move it closer to medium range naval systems like the RIM-162 ESSM or even the SM-2 Standard. Israel successfully tested the improved Barak II missile on 30 July 2009. The radar system provides 360 degree coverage and the missiles can take down an incoming missile as close as 500 meters away from the ship. Each Barak system (missile container, radar, computers and installation) costs about $24 million. Parallel to the Barak-8, IAI has completed development and is manufacturing the Barak MX system that broadens the Barak into a multi-layered air defense system employing unified smart launchers carrying Short, Medium, and Extended-Range interceptors. The Smart Launcher supports flexible deployment architecture for land and naval applications. Unlike the Barak-8 system, the interceptors, and sensors were developed exclusively by IAI to meet specific requirements from domestic and foreign customers.

== Development ==
The joint development of the LR-SAM missile (then named Barak-II) began in 2006 with an investment of ₹2,500 crore (equivalent to ₹88 billion or US$910 million in 2026). The missile is meant to be deployed on Project 15A destroyers which would enter service from 2012 onwards. The missile could be delivered to the Indian Armed Forces by 2013.

As reported in late May 2010, another contract, worth ₹10,000 crore (equivalent to ₹270 billion or US$2.8 billion in 2026), was signed that year for the development of another variant – Medium Range SAM (MR-SAM) for the Indian Air Force to replace their in-service Pechora missiles. Another variant planned was 100-km range theatre defence version called the Extended Range SAM for the Project 15B destroyers.

As per a report on 1 July 2010, replying to a query on the Indo-Israeli joint venture to develop a medium range surface-to-air missile, DRDO chief V. K. Saraswat told The Economic Times, "More than 70 per cent of the content in the missile being developed with Israel would be indigenous." As the Times of Israel reported in 2017, the development of the missile is taking place in India, including the development of the homing system. Some components and Inflight subsystems are manufactured by TASL.

On 3 October 2024, Bharat Electronics and Israel Aerospace Industries announced the formation of joint venture BEL IAI AeroSystems. It will serve as the exclusive point of contact for technical and maintenance related life cycle support of MR-SAM in Indian Armed Forces.

== Design (LR-SAM) ==
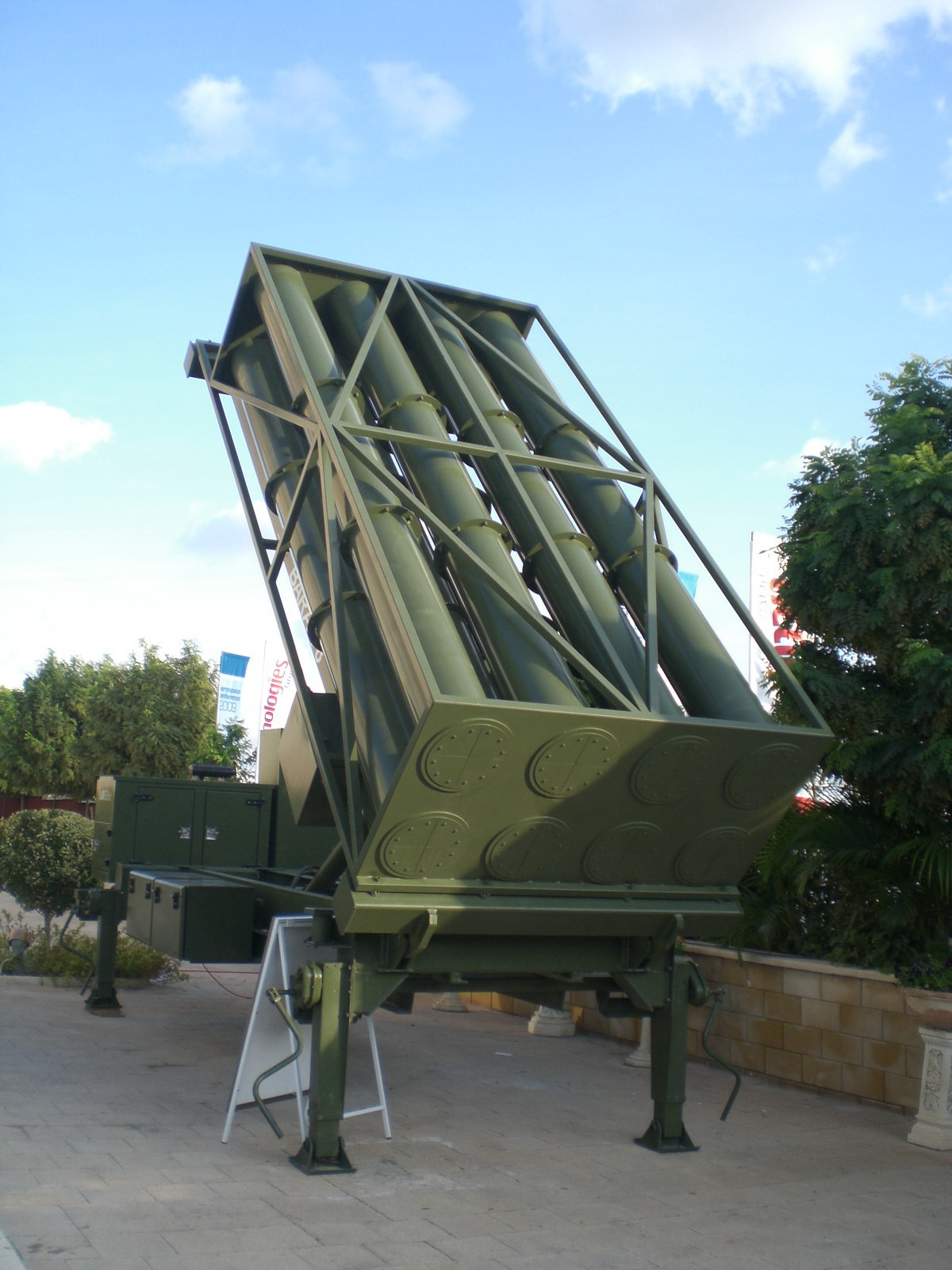
Barak 8 launcher module

The Barak 8 has a length of about 4.5 meters, a diameter of 0.225 meters at missile body, and 0.54 meters at the booster stage, a wingspan of 0.94 meters and weighs 275 kg including a 60 kg warhead which detonates at proximity. The missile has maximum speed of Mach 2 with a maximum operational range of 70 km, which was later increased to ~90 km, which was later further increased to 100 km. Barak 8 features a dual pulse rocket motor as well as thrust vector control, and possesses high degrees of maneuverability at target interception range. A second motor is fired during the terminal phase, at which stage the active radar seeker is activated to home in on to the enemy track. Barak 8 has been designed to counter a wide variety of airborne threats, such as anti-ship missiles, aircraft, UAVs drones and supersonic missiles. When coupled with a modern air-defence system and multi-function surveillance track and guidance radars, such as the EL/M-2248 MF-STAR AESA on board Kolkata-class destroyers, Barak 8 enables the capability to simultaneously engage multiple targets during saturation attacks. The aerodynamic characterization research was conducted at the National Aerospace Laboratories' 1.2m Trisonic Wind Tunnel Facility.

Israel Aerospace Industries describe Barak 8 as "an advanced, long-range missile defense and air defense system" with its main features being:

- Long Range
- Two way data link (GPS S band)
- Active Radar Seeker Missile
- 360-degree coverage
- Smokeless propulsion
- Thrust vector control
- Dual pulse propulsion
- Vertical Launch
- Multiple Simultaneous Engagements
- Point defence anti-ballistic missile

=== Structure ===
A land-based Firing Unit (FU) or a Battery consists of 1 Combat Management System (CMS), 1 Mobile Power System (MPS), 1 Advanced Long Range Radar, 1 Radar Power System (RPS), 3 Mobile Launcher Systems (MLS), 3 Reloader Vehicles (RV), Field Service Vehicle (FSV) and missiles. Each launcher will have eight such missiles in two stacks and are launched in a canister configuration. As for ship-based launchers, the missiles are similarly stored in a 2×4 vertical launching system (VLS) modules.

== Variants ==
=== Barak 8 series ===
- Long Range-Surface to Air Missile (LR-SAM): The ship-launched version used by the Indian Navy with an enhanced range of 100 km capable of engaging targets like missiles, fighter aircraft, maritime patrol aircraft (MPA), helicopter and sea-skimming missile. The LRSAM system includes multiple systems like advanced phased-array radars (EL/M-2248), command and control systems, launchers (2×4 configuration), and missiles with advanced radio-frequency (RF) seekers.
- Medium Range-Surface to Air Missile (MR-SAM): The land-based configuration of the missile used by the Indian Air Force and Indian Army. It consists of a command and control system, tracking radar (EL/M-2084), missile and mobile launcher systems. The system is also fitted with an advanced radio frequency (RF) Seeker. It has a range of 70 km according to the IAI.
- Barak-8ER: An ER (extended range) variant of the Barak 8 is under development, which will see the missiles maximum range increased to 150 km. Designed to engage multiple beyond visual range threats, the low launch signature Barak-8ER is understood to retain the same autopilot/inertial navigation system and active radar seeker guidance as the Barak-8, although some modifications to the software and to the missile control surfaces are likely. The booster increases the length of the missile at launch from its current 4.5 m to nearly 6 m, although the length in flight after the booster has been jettisoned may be slightly less than the base Barak-8 missile, if a TVC is not present. The missile diameter and fin spans are thought to be the same as the base Barak-8. The booster weight is currently unknown, although the missile's weight after the booster has been jettisoned is the same as that for the current Barak-8 configuration. Levy said that initial operational capability (IOC) for Barak-8ER will first be declared for the naval variant, followed by IOC for the land variant. He declined to comment on a launch customer for Barak-8ER, but noted "existing Barak-8 customers will be interested in this configuration because it offers additional capability to their current system".

== Flight tests ==
- On 14 May 2010, the LR-SAM (also called "Barak-II" during that time) was successfully test fired in Israel at an electronic target and met its initial objectives. The second test of the missile was planned to be held in India sometime later that same year.
- On 10 November 2014, the Barak 8 was successfully test fired in Israel with all integrated operational components for both marine and land systems. "The current test validated all components of the weapon system to the satisfaction of the customer representatives". It was the first involving a full operational scenario. The scenario began with launching the target. After being detected by the system's radar, the weapon system calculated the optimal interception point, launched the Barak 8 missile into its operational trajectory that acquired the target, and successfully intercepted it. All the weapon system's components met the test's goals successfully.
- On 26 November 2015, a successful test was conducted against a fast-moving jet-powered drone by the Israeli Sa'ar 5-class corvette INS Lahav. This was also the first test done from a naval ship, and also confirmed the range extension from the previous 70 km to ~100 km.
- On 29 and 30 December 2015, the Indian Navy successfully test-fired Barak 8 LRSAM from INS Kolkata. Two missiles were fired at high speed targets, during naval exercises undertaken in the Arabian Sea.

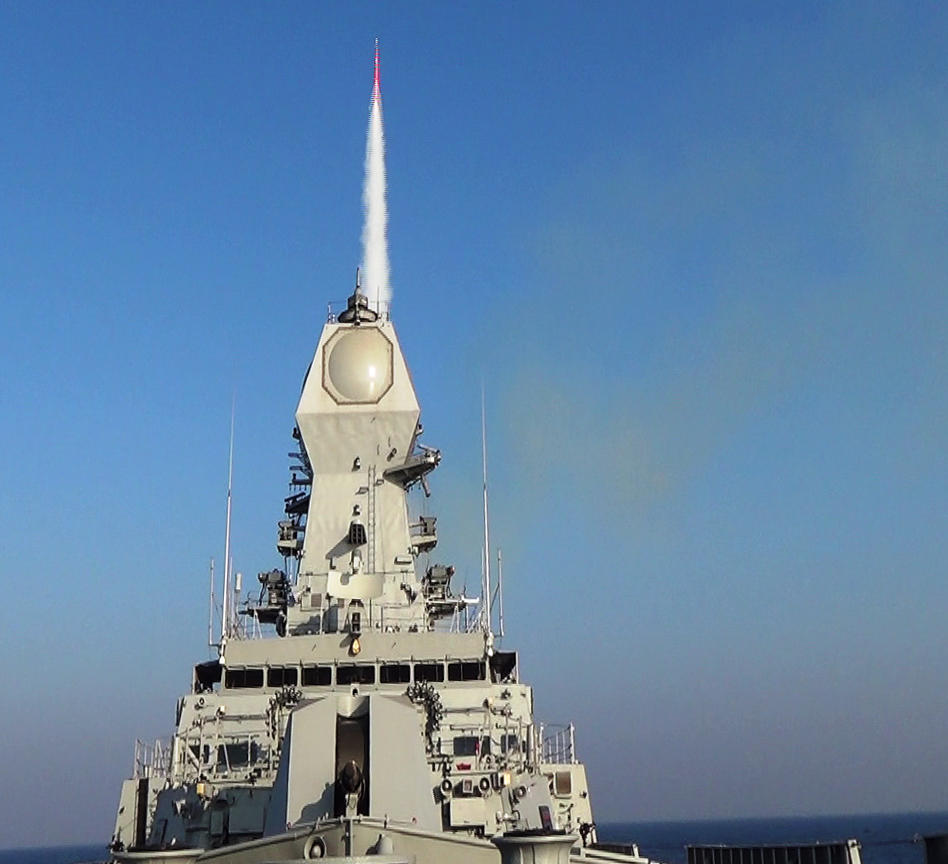
INS Kolkata firing a Barak 8 LRSAM

- On 30 June 2016, India test-fired a land based version of the Barak 8 surface-to-air missile for the first time from the Integrated Test Range (ITR) in Chandipur, Odisha, successfully hitting the target pilotless target aircraft (PTA) at 8:15 AM IST. the missile was again test fired for second time around noon where it again successfully hit a pilotless target aircraft over the Bay of Bengal. The test-firing of the missile was jointly carried out by Indian defence personnel, DRDO and IAI.
- On 1 July 2016, the MR-SAM (land-based version) was tested for the third time from the ITR at Chandipur in India, at 10:26 AM IST and the missile successfully hit a pilotless target aircraft, proving its reliability.
- On 20 and 21 September 2016, India successfully test fired the LRSAM for the first time against two pilotless target aircraft (PTA). The long range missile, developed for naval applications, was launched from a mobile launcher at the ITR in Chandipur at around 10:10 and 14:25 IST on both the days respectively.
- On 25 December 2016, Azerbaijan successfully tested the missile.
- On 10 February 2017, Israel Aerospace Industries test fired the missile at sea to verify its capabilities.
- On 16 May 2017, the Indian Navy successfully test fired the MRSAM variant from INS Kochi. According to a report, the course of the test was described as, "launch and engagement of the target, MFSTAR radar aboard the Indian naval ship identified the airborne threat and tracked it over its flying course, data was sent to the command center of the weapon system which launched the intercepting missile into orbit, having been successfully launched, the missile navigated itself to the target during flight it engaged the target, aligned its course, hit it and destroyed it, successfully demonstrating all the goals assigned to each component".
- On 29 November 2017, the Indian Navy test fired again the MRSAM from INS Kochi.

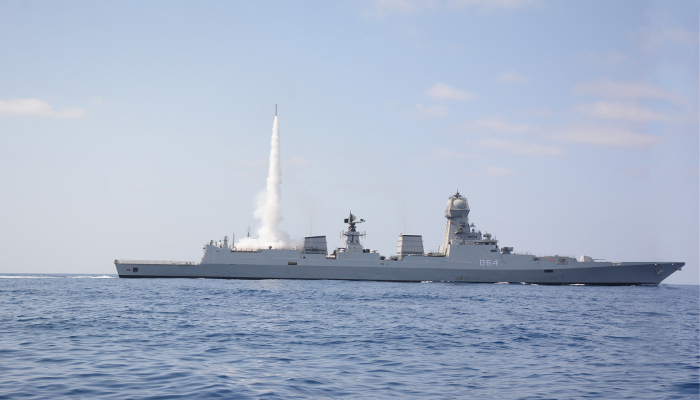
INS Kochi firing a Barak-8 MRSAM variant

- On 25 January 2019, the Indian Navy test fired the LRSAM from INS Chennai against an incoming aerial target flying at a low altitude.
- On 15 May 2019, the MRSAM variant was first operated in their full Joint Taskforce Coordinating (JTC) mode by the Indian Navy via their two Kolkata-class destroyer: INS Kochi and INS Chennai. The JTC mode implements the Cooperative Engagement Capability (CEC) of the Barak-8 MRSAM system. Both ships launched the missiles but only one was doing the actual engagement role. The demonstration was done on India's western seaboard.
- On 23 November 2020, the missile was successfully tested by India from ITR at Chandipur when a Banshee unmanned air vehicle (UAV) was hit mid-air. The entire mission trajectory from the launch to plunging into the sea was monitored by various radars and electro-optico instruments.
- On 27 March 2022, DRDO conducted two successful flight tests of the Indian Army version of MRSAM at Integrated Test Range, Chandipur off the coast of Odisha. The first launch was to intercept a medium altitude long range target and second launch was for proving the capability of a low altitude short range target.
- On 30 March 2022, DRDO again conducted two successful flight tests of the Indian Army version of MRSAM at ITR, Chandipur off the coast of Odisha within three days. The launches were carried out establishing the accuracy and reliability of the weapon system against targets covering the sea skimming and high-altitude functionality within the envelope. With the conclusion of flight trials for different ranges and scenarios, the system has completed its development trials.
- On 3 and 4 April 2025, DRDO and the Indian Army conducted four successful flight tests of the Army version of MRSAM from Dr. APJ Abdul Kalam Island, Odisha. The operational trials targeted high-speed aerial threats, with the missiles achieving direct hits at long-range, short-range, high altitude, and low altitude, proving the system's operational capability. The tests were conducted under operational conditions, with performance validated through data from radars and electro-optical tracking systems. These trials demonstrated the capabilities of both Eastern and Southern Commands and set the stage for the deployment of the weapon systems in two regiments.
- On 24 April 2025, INS Surat conducted a missile test of MRSAM which intercepted a sea-skimming target in the Arabian Sea through precision cooperative engagement.

== Deployment (India) ==
=== Orders ===
- 2006: Development contract and order, worth ₹2,500 crore (equivalent to ₹88 billion or US$910 million in 2026), for LR-SAM (then, Barak-II) for Indian Navy's Kolkata-class destroyer.
- February 2009: Israel signed a $1.1 billion or ₹10,000 crore (equivalent to ₹270 billion or US$2.8 billion in 2026) contract to supply an upgraded tactical Barak 8 air defence system to India for the MR-SAM system with deliveries expected by 2017. The order included purchase of 18 firing units (9 squadrons) of MRSAMs for the Indian Air Force along with 450 missiles. The deal also included the developmental cost for the weapon system.
- February 2017: The Cabinet Committee on Security chaired by the Indian Prime Minister, Narendra Modi, cleared a deal to acquire MR-SAM system for the Indian Army worth around ₹17,000 crore (equivalent to ₹260 billion or US$2.7 billion in 2026). Deployment of the system was expected by 2023. The order included the purchase of five regiments (8 firing units each) with 40 firing units and 200 missiles for ₹17,000 crore (equivalent to ₹260 billion or US$2.7 billion in 2026). The order worth $1.6 billion was placed by the Indian Army in April 2017. This marked the largest single purchase in IAI history. The order also included missiles for the Navy's INS Vikrant.
- On 21 May 2017, IAI received an order of $630 million from the Indian Navy to equip four ships of the Visakhapatnam-class destroyer with the LR-SAM system. The order was executed along with BEL. The missile was already operational with the Indian Air Force and Navy.
- On 5 September 2018, MDL and GRSE awarded Bharat Electronics with a ₹9,200 crore (equivalent to ₹130 billion or US$1.4 billion in 2026) contract to supply seven Barak-8 LR-SAM air defence systems for the Nilgiri-class frigates. In October 2018, Bharat Electronics signed a $777 million deal with Israel Aerospace Industries to help fulfil the Barak-8 order.
- In January 2019, the Indian Navy and Cochin Shipyard and IAI struck a ₹6,800 crore (equivalent to ₹92 billion or US$960 million in 2026) deal to deliver LR-SAM for INS Vikrant and provide maintenance and other services for various MSRAM sub-systems.
- In July 2019, the Rafael Advanced Defense Systems awarded a $100 million contract to Kalyani Rafael Advanced Systems (KRAS) for the production of 1,000 MR-SAM missile kits for the Indian Army and Air Force orders. KRAS announced that it had begun delivery of the first batch of MR-SAM missile kits to BDL on 16 March 2021.
- On 16 January 2025, the Indian Ministry of Defence (MoD) signed a contract with BDL for the supply of over 70 MRSAM missiles for the Indian Navy at a cost of around ₹2,960 crore (equivalent to ₹31 billion or US$320 million in 2026).
- The Defence Acquisition Council (DAC), chaired by the Minister of Defence, cleared the procurement of over 700 MRSAM missiles at a cost of ₹30,000 crore (equivalent to ₹310 billion or US$3.2 billion in 2026) in December 2025.
- The Defence Acquisition Council (DAC) cleared multiple procurement projects including one for MRSAM weapon systems for the Indian Army on 3 July 2026.

=== Production ===
For the missiles meant for the Indian Armed Forces, Bharat Dynamics Limited (BDL) is the lead integrator of the missile. Components of the missile is manufactured by Kalyani Rafael Advanced Systems (KRAS), a joint venture between the Kalyani Group and Rafael, at Kalyani Rafael's plant in Hyderabad, Telangana before being sent to Bharat Dynamics Limited for further integration. The Combat Management System is for the system is designed and manufactured by Tata Advanced Systems. With a $100 million investment, BDL built a new production facility in Hyderabad to produce MRSAM and LRSAM missiles. The factory manufacture 100 missiles annually. Rafael, Elta, L&T, Bharath Electronics (BEL), and other private companies are among the other contractors working on the MRSAM.

=== Deployment ===
The Indian Navy had the missile systems deployed on Kolkata- and Visakhapatnam-class destroyers by December 2015. The first production variants missile was delivered to the Navy on 29 August 2017 at a ceremony in Hyderabad.

On 9 September 2021, the first Firing Unit was delivered to the Indian Air Force following which, the first MRSAM Squadron was operationalised at Jaisalmer Air Force Station in the presence of the Indian Defence Minister, Rajnath Singh. It was reported that IAF had plans to acquire 9 squadrons of MRSAM with 24 firing units (or batteries) and a total of 2,000 missiles.

In February 2023, the first MRSAM regiment of the Indian Army was raised under the aegis of XXXIII Corps under the Eastern Command. The MRSAM Weapon System was operationally named as Abhra Weapon System.

In October 2023, it was reported that another MRSAM squadron was deployed at Adampur Air Force Station. Previously, in 2021, an S-400 squadron was also deployed at the same base.

The army variant of MRSAM was featured in the Republic Day Parade in 2024. The LBMFSTAR (EL/M-2084) radar and launchers of the variant are mounted on Tata LPTA 3138 8x8 HMV.

== Service history ==
Middle East Eye quoted an unnamed official from an unnamed country stating that a Barak 8 operated by the Azerbaijani Armed Forces intercepted an Iskander missile shot by Armenia towards Baku towards the end of the 2020 Nagorno-Karabakh war, adding that the firing of the Iskander convinced the Azerbaijan government to accept a ceasefire. Whether Armenia used any Iskanders during the war is disputed: there were reports on social media of Armenia using the Iskander, but the Russian Defense Ministry said Armenia didn't fire any Iskanders, and Azerbaijan stated it didn't detect any Iskander launches during the war.

During the 2025 India–Pakistan conflict, Indian media reported that the MRSAM system intercepted Pakistani Fatah-2 rockets over Sirsa, Haryana. The MRSAM squadron was stationed at Sirsa AFS while the air officer commanding of 45 Wing, Air Commodore Rohit Kapil, received the Yudh Seva Medal on 14 August 2025 for the interception of the missile.

== Operators ==
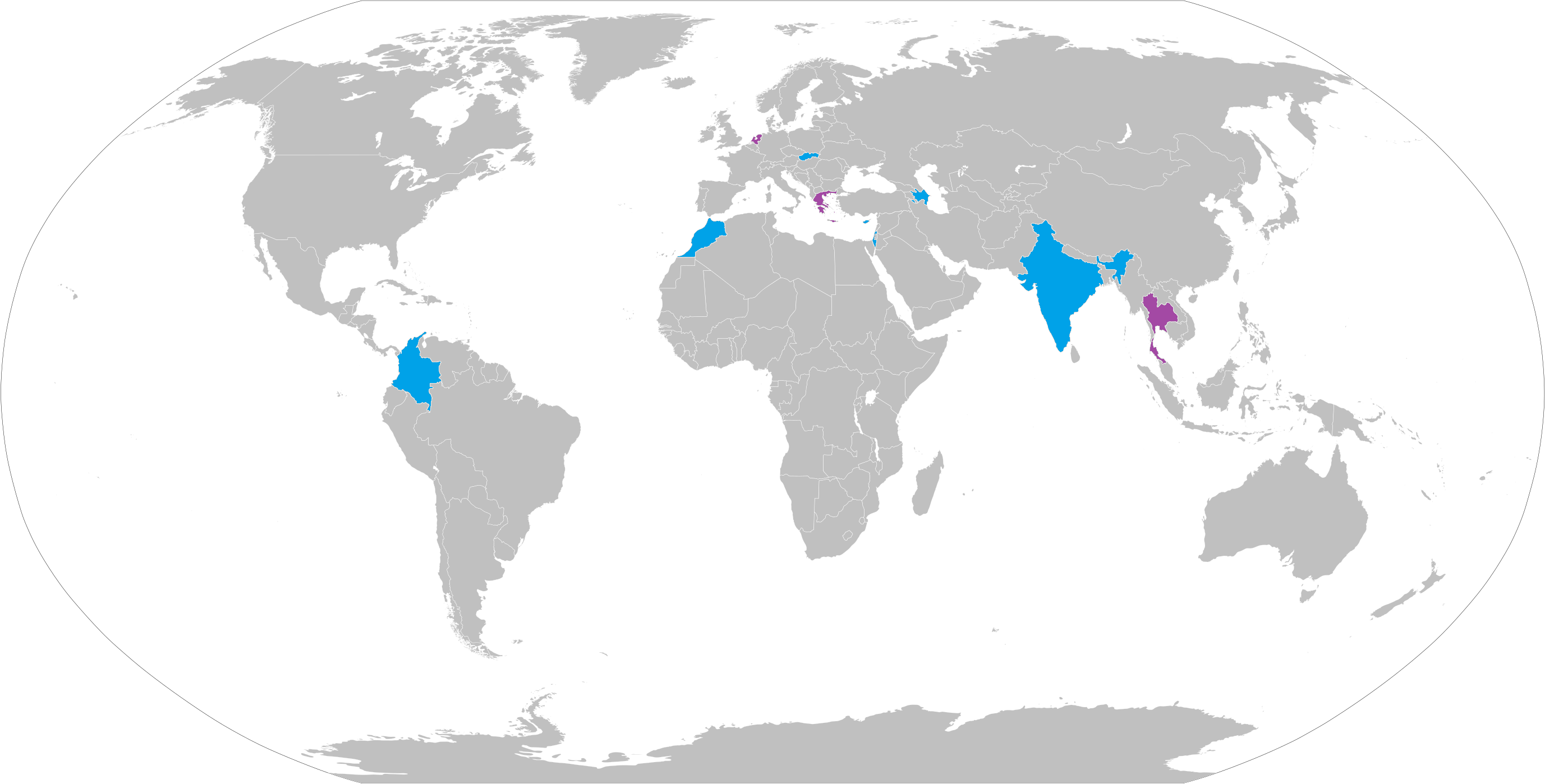
Map with Barak 8 operators in blue Current operators Future Users

=== Current operators ===
- Azerbaijan: Azerbaijan bought 12 Barak 8 missile systems along with 75 missiles.
- India:
  - Indian Army: 5 regiments on order
    - Abhra regiment, XXXIII Corps
  - Indian Air Force: 9 squadrons on order
    - MRSAM squadron, 41 Wing, Jaisalmer AFS
    - MRSAM squadron, 8 Wing, Adampur AFS
    - MRSAM squadron, 45 Wing, Sirsa AFS
  - Indian Navy
    - INS Vikrant
    - Kolkata-class destroyer
    - Visakhapatnam-class destroyer
    - Nilgiri-class frigate
- Israel:
  - Sa'ar 5-class corvette

=== Potential operators ===
- United Arab Emirates
- Vietnam

== See also ==
- Akash – (India)
- Akash-NG – (India)
- Aster – (France, Italy)
- Barak 1 – (Israel)
- Bavar-373 – (Iran)
- CAMM – (United Kingdom, Italy)
- HİSAR – (Turkey)
- HQ-9 – (China)
- Khordad 15 – (Iran)
- MIM-104 Patriot – (United States)
- Project Kusha – (India)
- Anant Shastra – (India)
- Ra'ad – (Iran)
- RIM-174 Standard ERAM – (United States)
- RIM-66 Standard – (United States)
- RIM-67 Standard – (United States)
- Sayyad-4 – (Iran)
- Tor missile system – (Soviet Union, Russia)
- VL-SRSAM – (India)
