= Chandramouli Gaddamanugu =

Indian scientist

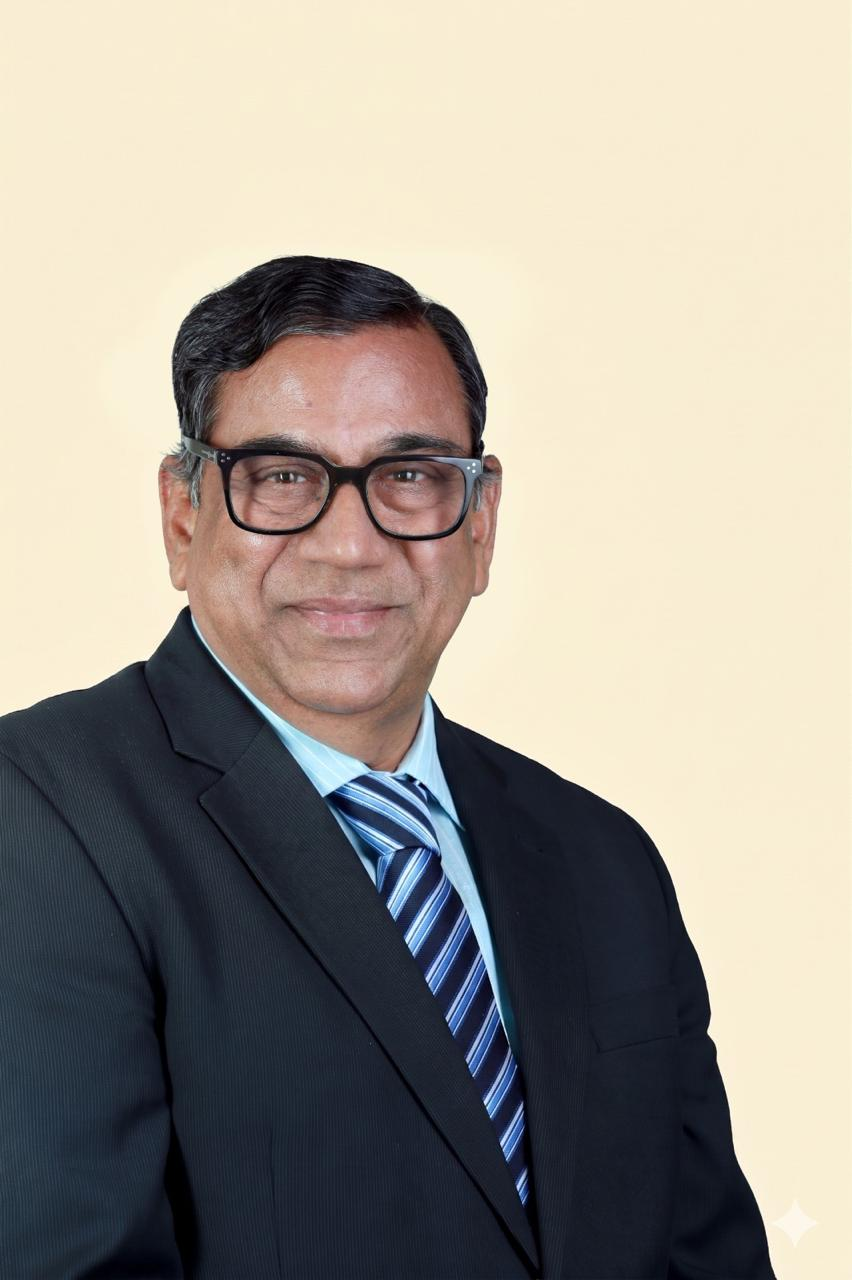
- Dr. Chandramouli
- Born: 5 October 1959 (age 67); Madhira, Khammam district (present-day Telangana), India
- Education: B.Tech., National Institute of Technology, Warangal; M.Tech., Indian Institute of Technology Delhi; Ph.D., Osmania University
- Known for: Development of the surface-to-air missile Akash (missile)
- Awards: Padma Shri (2026)
- Scientific career
- Fields: Missile technology, Defence research
- Workplaces: Defence Research and Development Laboratory (DRDL); Defence Research and Development Organisation (DRDO)

Dr Chandramouli Gaddamanugu is a distinguished Indian defence scientist of the Defence Research and Development Laboratory (DRDL) under DRDO. He is best known for his foundational and leadership roles in development and production of India’s first indigenous supersonic multiple target handling surface-to-air missile system, surface-to-air missile Akash (missile). In 2026, he was awarded the Padma Shri, India's fourth-highest civilian honour, for his contributions to science and engineering.

== Early life and education ==
Dr Chandramouli is from Madhira town, Telangana. He completed his Bachelor of Technology (B.Tech) in Mechanical Engineering from National Institute of Technology, Warangal. He later obtained a Master of Technology (M.Tech) from Indian Institute of Technology, Delhi. He obtained Doctor of Philosophy (Ph.D) from Osmania University in Mechanical Engineering.

== Career ==
Chandramouli joined the Defence Research and Development Laboratory (DRDL) in 1983. His early years at the organisation coincided with the launch of the Integrated Guided Missile Development Programme (IGMDP), under which he became associated with the development of the Akash surface-to-air missile system. He worked under the leadership of A. P. J. Abdul Kalam and remained associated with the Akash programme for much of his career at the Defence Research and Development Organisation (DRDO).

During the development of Akash (Missile), Chandramouli worked in areas including system integration, configuration control and flight testing. He was involved in integrating the missile with its launchers, radars and command-and-control systems across wheeled and tracked platforms, and participated in the programme's flight-testing phase. According to published accounts, he supervised more than 100 flight tests against different aerial targets before the system was inducted into the Indian Army and the Indian Air Force.

Chandramouli later served as Project Director of the Akash programme, coordinating work among DRDO laboratories, defence public-sector undertakings and industrial partners involved in the production and induction of the missile system. His responsibilities included aspects of customizing the designs and engineering of Akash missile systems to Indian Army and Indian Air Force, production planning, technology transfer, guiding the development agencies, manufacturers, User agencies and demonstrating the performance of system through validation flight tests, before delivery to Users.

He subsequently served as Programme Director for Tactical Missiles. In this role, he was associated with the development and review of later air-defence missile programmes, including Akash-1S, Akash Prime and the Quick Reaction Surface-to-Air Missile (QRSAM), with responsibilities related to technical reviews, flight testing and technology transfer.

== Awards and recognition ==
Agni Award for excellence in self reliance (DRDO) in 2005, Bharata Ratna Sir Mokshagundam Visvesvaraya Award (Institute of Engineers India & Govt of Andhra Pradesh) in 2007, Path breaking Research Award (DRDO)in 2008, Scientist of the Award (DRDO) in 2013, Global Research and Development (FICCI) in 2014, Distinguished Alumni Professional Achievement Award (NIT Warangal) in 2014, Project Leader of Excellence Award (PMA India) in 2015, Manager of the year Award (HMA) in 2015, Project Leader of Excellence Award (FTAPCCI) in 2016,Outstanding Contributions to National Development Award (IIT Delhi) in 2026, Sri Ramanavami Pratibha Puraskaram Award 2026 from Sanathana Dharma Charitable Trust, Padma Shri Award 2026 in Science and Engineering from Government of India.

== See also ==
- Akash (missile)
- Defence Research and Development Organisation
- Integrated Guided Missile Development Programme
- Defence Research and Development Laboratory
