= Akash (missile) =

Indian surface-to-air missile series

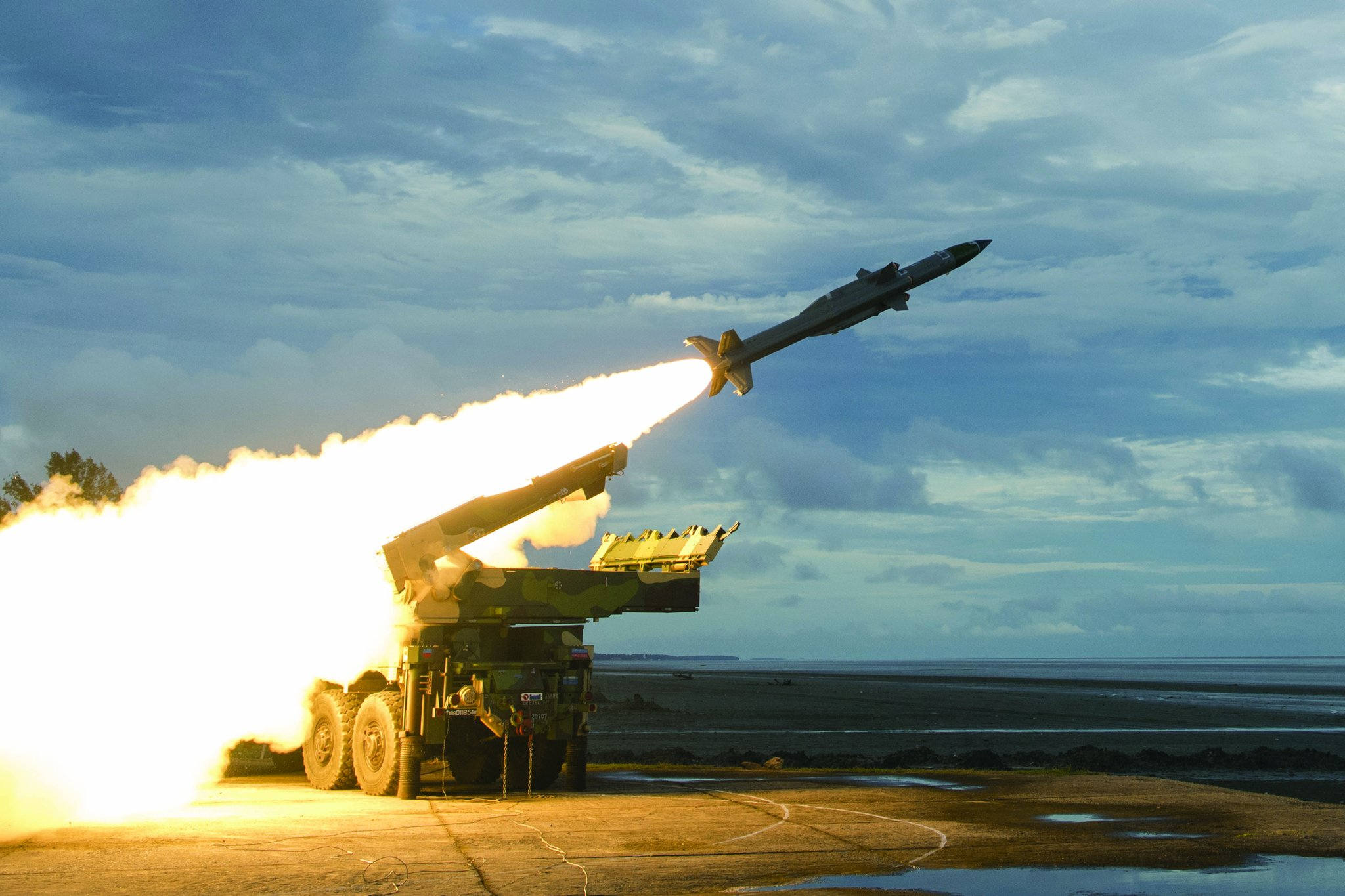
- Latest variant, Akash Prime missile being fired from a mobile launcher
- Type: Mobile Surface-to-air missile system
- Place of origin: India

Service history
- In service: 2009-present
- Used by: Indian Army; Indian Air Force; Armenian Armed Forces; See Operators
- Wars: 2025 India–Pakistan conflict

Production history
- Designer: Prahlada Rama Rao
- Manufacturer: Bharat Dynamics Limited
- Unit cost: ₹2.5 crore (US$250K)
- Produced: 2009–present
- No. built: 15,500 missiles till 2025
- Variants: Akash 1S; Akash Prime; Akash-NG

Specifications
- Mass: 720 kg (1,590 lb)
- Length: 578 cm (228 in)
- Diameter: 30 cm (12 in) – 35 cm (14 in)
- Warhead: High-explosive, fragmentation
- Warhead weight: 60 kg (130 lb)
- Detonation mechanism: Radio proximity fuze
- Engine: Solid booster with air-augmented rocket and ramjet sustainer motor
- Propellant: Solid fuel
- Operational range: • MK 1/1S – 25 km (16 miles) • Prime – 30 km (19 miles) • NG – 50 km (31 miles)
- Flight ceiling: 20 km (66,000 ft)
- Flight altitude: 18 km (59,000 ft)
- Maximum speed: Mach 1.8 to 2.5
- Guidance system: Mid-course: Command guidance with datalink Terminal: Active radar homing
- Launch platform: T-72 or BMP-2 or BEML–Tatra chassis (Army); Tata LPTA 3138 8×8 Trucks (Air Force)

Akash (lit. 'Sky') is an Indian medium-range mobile surface-to-air missile (SAM) system developed by the Defence Research and Development Organisation (DRDO). The Army and the Air Force variants of the missile system are produced by Bharat Dynamics Limited (BDL) and Bharat Electronics Limited (BEL). Surveillance and fire control radar, Tactical Command and Control Center and missile launcher are developed by BEL, Tata Advanced Systems Limited and Larsen & Toubro. The Akash missile system can target aircraft up to 45 km (28 mi) away. It has the capability to neutralise aerial targets like fighter jets, cruise missiles and air-to-surface missiles. It is in operational service with the Indian Army and the Indian Air Force. In Armenian service, the system has been designated as Lusan (lit. 'Lynx').

An Akash battery comprises a single PESA 3D Rajendra radar and four launchers with three missiles each, all of which are interlinked. Each battery can track up to 64 targets and attack up to 12 of them. The missile has a 60 kg (130 lb) high-explosive, pre-fragmented warhead with a proximity fuse. The Akash system is fully mobile and capable of protecting a moving convoy of vehicles. The launch platform has been integrated with both wheeled and tracked vehicles. While the Akash system has primarily been designed as an air defence SAM, it also has been tested in a missile defense role. The system provides air defence missile coverage for an area of 2,000 km^{2} (770 sq mi). The Indian military's combined orders of the Akash, including radar systems (WLR and Surveillance), have a total worth of ₹28,800 crore (equivalent to ₹440 billion or US$4.7 billion in 2026). As per Ministry of Defence (MoD) Report 2018, existing order of Akash saved ₹34,500 crore (equivalent to ₹500 billion or US$5.4 billion in 2026) of foreign exchange for India on imports.

== Description ==
=== System ===
Akash missile destroying target

Each Akash battery consists of four self-propelled Launchers (three Akash SAMs each), a Battery Level Radar – the Rajendra, and a Command post (Battery Control Centre). Two batteries are deployed as a Squadron (Air Force), while up to four form an Akash Group/Regiment (Army configuration). In both configurations, an extra Group Control Centre (GCC) is added, which acts as the Command and Control HQ of the Squadron or Group. Based on a single mobile platform, GCC establishes links with Battery Control Centres and conducts air defense operations in coordination with air defense set up in a zone of operations. For early warning, the GCC relies on the Central Acquisition Radar. However, individual batteries can also be deployed with the cheaper, 2-D BSR (Battery Surveillance Radar) with a range of over 100 km.

Akash has an advanced automated functioning capability. The 3D CAR automatically starts tracking targets at a distance of around 150 km providing early warning to the system and operators. The target track information is transferred to GCC. GCC automatically classifies the target. BSR starts tracking targets around a range of 100 km. This data is transferred to GCC. The GCC performs multi-radar tracking of up to 200 targets and carries out track correlation & data fusion. Target position information is sent to the BLR which uses this information to acquire the targets.

The BCC which can engage a target(s) from the selected list at the earliest point of time is assigned the target in real time by the GCC. The availability of missiles and the health of the missiles are also taken into consideration during this process. Fresh targets are assigned as and when intercepts with assigned targets are completed. A single shot kill probability of 88% has been achieved by the system taking into consideration various parametres of the sensors, guidance command, missile capabilities and kill zone computations.

There are a number of possibilities for deploying Akash weapon system in autonomous mode and in group mode for neutralizing the threat profiles with defined multi-target engagement scenarios. In the Group mode we can have number of configurations to defend vulnerable areas depending upon nature and expected threat pattern, characteristics of threat. Similarly, multiple batteries in autonomous mode can be deployed to defend vulnerable areas/points. In a Group formation, the four Batteries can be deployed in various geometric formations, as suited to the vulnerable area being protected and the extent desired to be sanitized from enemy air threat. In a box deployment pattern, an Akash group can defend an area of 62 km × 62 km. In a linear array configuration, it covers an area of 98 km × 44 km. Trapezoidal configuration gives defense to the largest area as compared to any other pattern of deployment covering an area of size 5,000 km^{2}.

Each Akash battery can engage up to four targets simultaneously with 24 ready to fire missiles. Each battery has four launchers with three missiles, while each Rajendra able to guide eight missiles in total, with a maximum of two missiles per target. Up to a maximum of four targets can be engaged simultaneously by a typical battery with a single Rajendra if one (or two) missile is allotted per target. A single Akash missile has an 88% probability of kill. Two missiles can be fired, five seconds apart, to raise the probability of Kill to 98.5%. Communications between the various vehicles are a combination of wireless and wired links. The entire system is designed to be set up quickly and to be highly mobile for high survivability. The Akash system can be deployed by rail, road or air.

The Akash SAM has been interfaced with both the Akashteer and the Integrated Air Command and Control System.

=== Missile ===
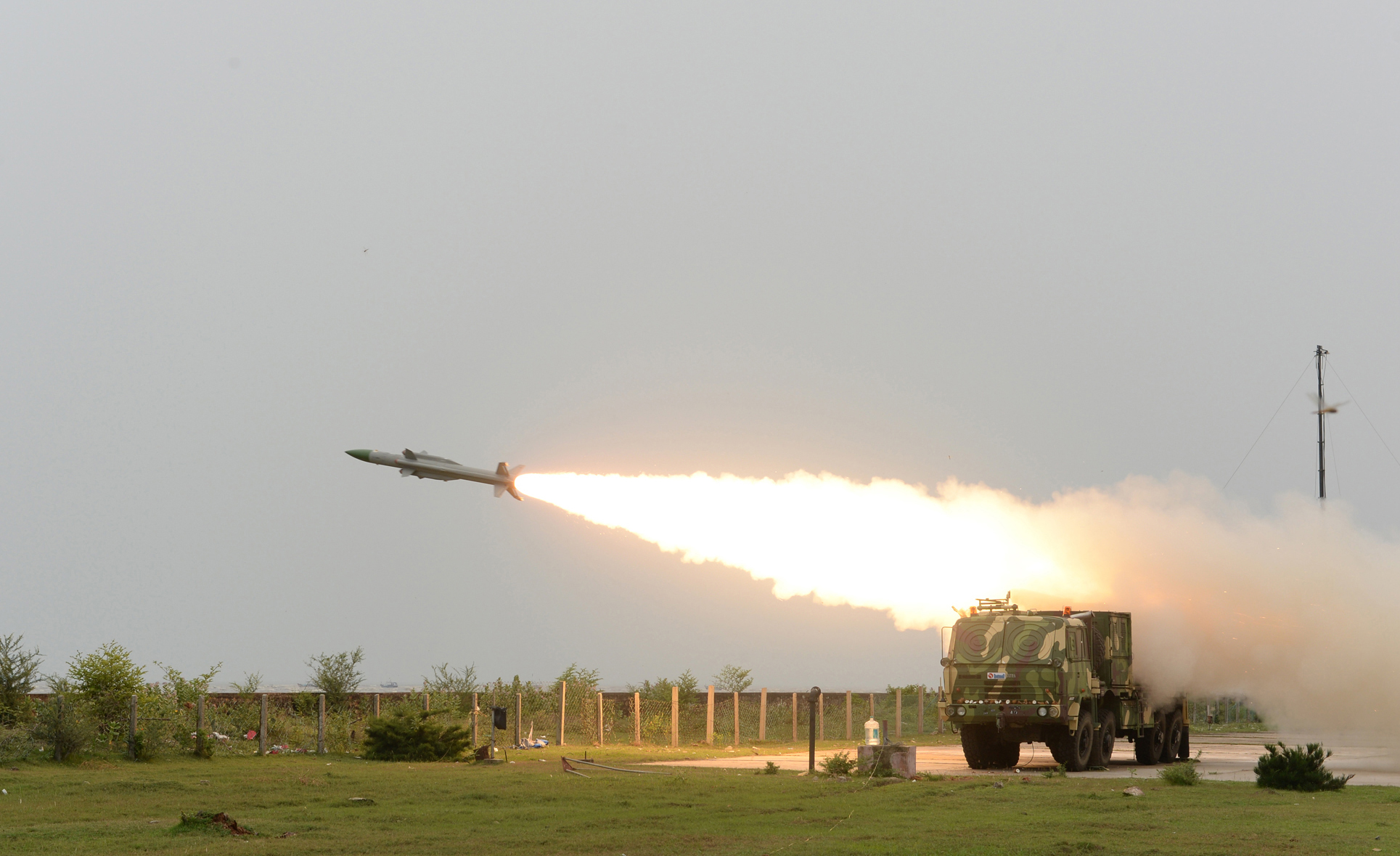
Akash missile test fired for very low altitude near boundary mission on 18 June 2014.

Akash is a surface-to-air missile with an intercept range of 25 km. It has a launch weight of 720 kg, a diameter of 35 cm and a length of 5.78 meters. Akash flies at supersonic speed, reaching around Mach 2.5. It can reach an altitude of 20 km and can be fired from both tracked and wheeled platforms. An on-board guidance system coupled with an actuator system makes the missile maneuverable up to 15g loads and a tail chase capability for end game engagement. A digital proximity fuse is coupled with a 55 kg pre-fragmented warhead, while the safety arming and detonation mechanism enables a controlled detonation sequence. A self-destruct device is also integrated. It is propelled by an Integrated Ramjet Rocket Engine. The use of a ramjet propulsion system enables sustained speeds without deceleration throughout its flight. The missile has command guidance in its entire flight.

The design of the missile is somewhat similar to that of the 2K12 Kub with four long tube ramjet inlet ducts mounted mid-body between wings. For pitch/yaw control four clipped triangular moving wings are mounted on the mid-body. For roll control four inline clipped delta fins with ailerons are mounted before the tail. However, the internal schematic shows a different layout with an onboard digital computer, absence of semi-active seeker, different propellant, different actuators and command guidance with datalinks. The Akash carries an onboard radio-proximity fuse.

Composite technology for Akash includes radome assemblies, booster liners, ablative liners, sustainer liners, compression molded wings and fins. The aerodynamic characterization research was conducted at the National Aerospace Laboratories' 1.2 m Trisonic Wind Tunnel Facility.

=== Propulsion ===
The Akash, like the Russian 2K12 Kub (SA-6 Gainful), utilizes an integrated ramjet-rocket propulsion system, which, after initial rocket motor burnout, provides sustained thrust for the missile throughout its flight until interception.

=== Radars ===
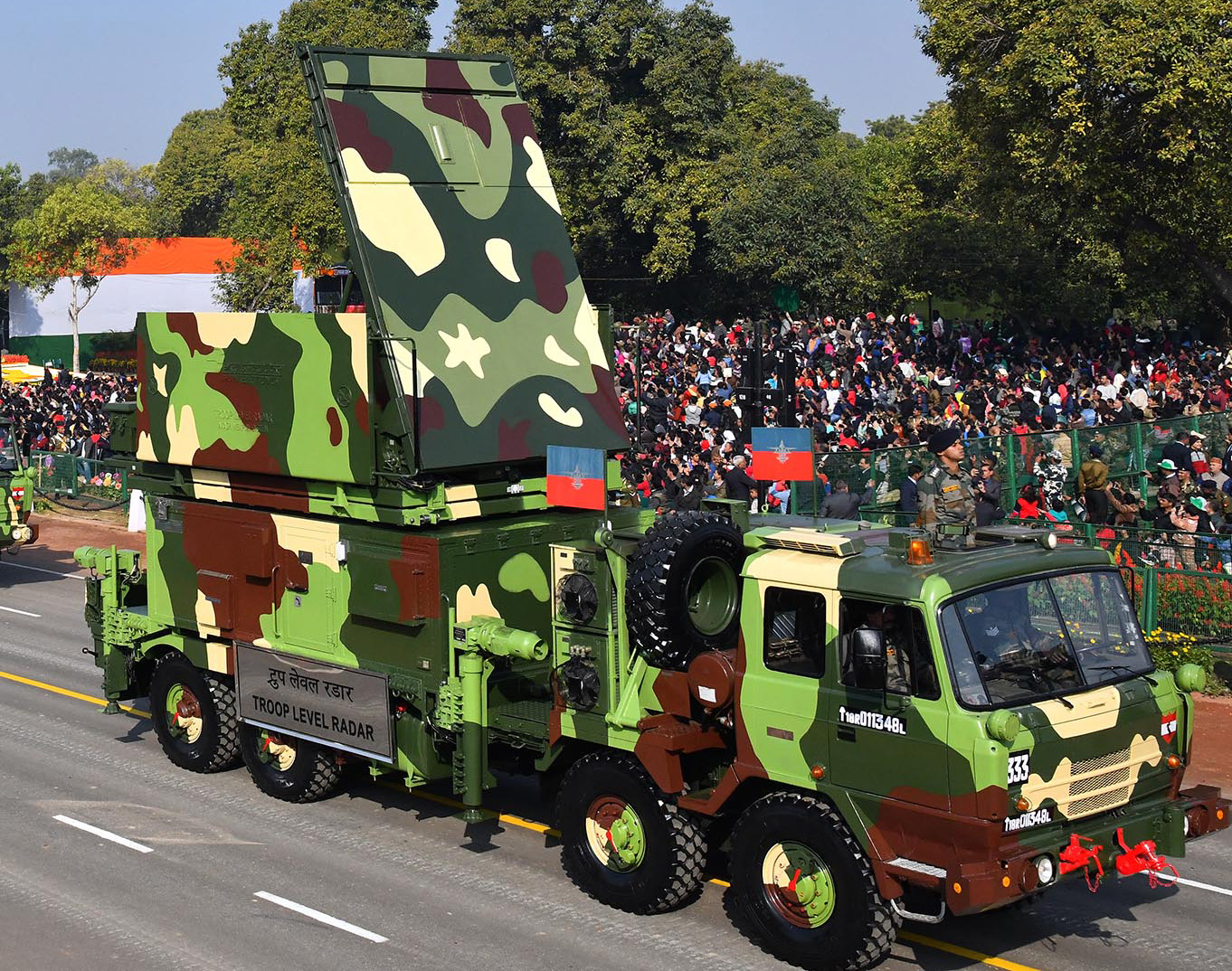
Rajendra Radar during Republic Day, 2019

The missile is guided by a phased array fire control radar called 'Rajendra' which is termed as Battery Level Radar (BLR) with a tracking range of about 60 km. The tracking and missile guidance radar configuration consists of a slewable phased array antenna of more than 4,000 elements, spectrally pure TWT transmitter, two stage superheterodyne correlation receiver for three channels, high speed digital signal processor, real time management computer and a powerful radar data processor. It can track 64 targets in range, azimuth and height and guide eight missiles simultaneously in ripple fire mode towards four targets. The radar has advanced ECCM features. The Rajendra derivative on a BMP-2 chassis and to be used by the Indian Air Force is known as the Battery Level Radar-II whereas that for the Army, is based on a T-72 chassis and is known as the Battery Level Radar-III.

The Army version also consists of the Battery Surveillance Radar (BSR). BSR is a track vehicle based, long range sensor, interfaced with the BCC. It can detect and track up to 40 targets in range and azimuth up to a range of 100 km.

Long range target acquisition is performed by the 3D Central Acquisition Radar (3D CAR), which is a long range surveillance radar that can track up to 200 targets in Track while Scan mode (detecting, tracking and processing) in three dimensions at a range of 180 km. It provides azimuth, range and height coordinates of targets to the Group Control Centre (GCC) through secure communication links. The data is used to cue the weapon control radar.

=== Platforms ===
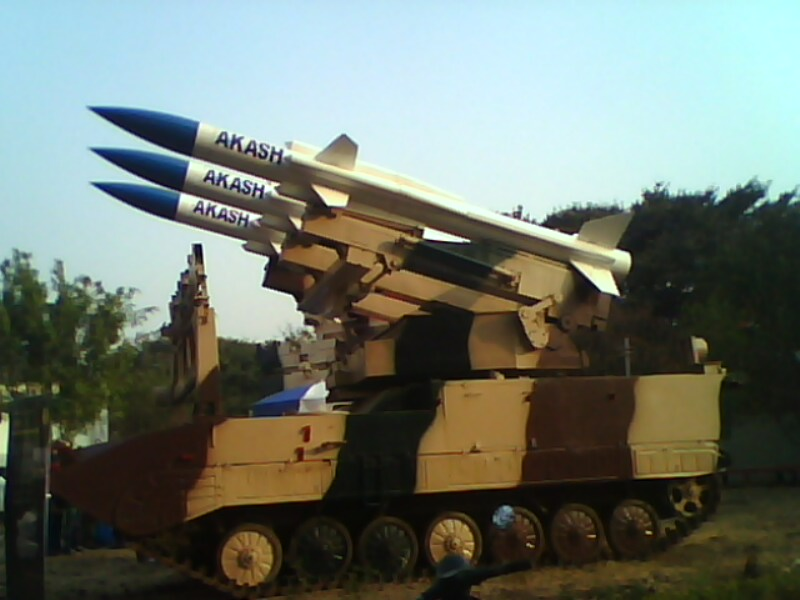
Akash Missiles on a BMP-2 chassis.

The Army's radar and launchers are based on the T-72 chassis built by the Ordnance Factories Board's Ordnance Factory Medak to accompany the Army's fast moving armoured formations. The Air Force versions use a combination of tracked and wheeled vehicle. The Air Force Akash launcher consists of a detachable trailer which is towed by a Tata truck, which can be positioned autonomously. The Air Force launcher is designed by Larsen & Toubro jointly with DRDO. Both the Army and Air Force launchers have three ready-to-fire Akash missiles each. The launchers can slew in both elevation and azimuth. The Army Self-Propelled Launcher (ASPL) is 360 degrees slewable and its arc in elevation is from 6 to 60 degrees. The Akash Air Force Launcher (AAFL) is 360 degree slewable, in elevation it can fire from 8 to 55 degrees in all directions depending on the mode of deployment.

Akash Air force launcher features an All electro servo drive system for fully automated and remote operation.To enable the Akash group to perform self-sufficient in the combat zone, a number of supporting specialist vehicles have been designed and developed. They are mobile and field-worthy. Their design is based on the role and task to be performed and the vehicles are accordingly allocated to the Group HQ, the Batteries, Assembly Line Area and the Field maintenance workshop. Some of the vehicles are: the Missile Transportation Vehicle (MTV), the Transportation and Loading Vehicle (TLV), the Mobile Station for Missile Checkout (MSMC) Vehicle, the Air Compressor Vehicle (ACV), the Power Supply vehicles (GPSV, BPSV), the Engineering Support, Maintenance and Repair vehicles (GEM, BEM) and a few others. These specialist vehicles assemble and prepare missiles, deliver them to Batteries, carry maintenance spares and fuel, and provide logistical engineering support. Their allocation provides for flexibility and self-sufficiency to the whole Akash Group.

The Indian Navy did not opt to aid in the development of a navalised variant of the Akash missile as its launcher systems where not stabilised for firing in open seas and therefore were considered unsuitable for shipborne usage. The Navy opted for the Israeli Barak-1 and the co-developed the Barak-8 missile for the Tri-service forces.

== Development and history ==
The development of the missile began in 1984 as a part of the Integrated Guided Missile Development Programme (IGMDP) with an estimated development cost of ₹300 crore (equivalent to ₹51 billion or US$550 million in 2026) under the directorship of Prahlada Ramarao.

The Akash Missile Development cost of ₹1,000 crore (equivalent to ₹15 billion or US$160 million in 2026), including the project sanction of ₹600 crore (equivalent to ₹918 crore or US$98 million in 2026), is 8-10 times lower than the cost of similar system developments in other countries. Akash has certain unique characteristics like mobility, all-the-way-powered flight till target interception, multiple target handling, digitally-coded command guidance and fully automatic operation.

Bharat Electronics, Bangalore is the Nodal Production Agency for the Akash Weapon System and also the production partner of the radar systems. Bharat Dynamics Limited (Missile), Larsen & Toubro (Missile and Launcher), Electronics Corporation of India Limited (Command and Control Centre), and Tata Power Company Limited (Launcher) are the other major production partners.

As of 2008, each missile is expected to have starting costs below ₹2 crore (equivalent to ₹6.1 crore or US$650,000 in 2026) which is less than half the cost of similar Western missiles which usually cost between US$1.2-1.5 million (₹5-6 crore) each. It is expected that this cost will further decrease because of the economies of scale achieved as production ramps up.

For the first time, Akash showed in Exercise Astrashakti 2023 that it could engage four targets at once under command guidance with a single fire unit at a maximum range of about 30 km. The targets were divided to attack defence assets from various angles and were approaching from the same direction in a close formation.

=== Mark 1 ===
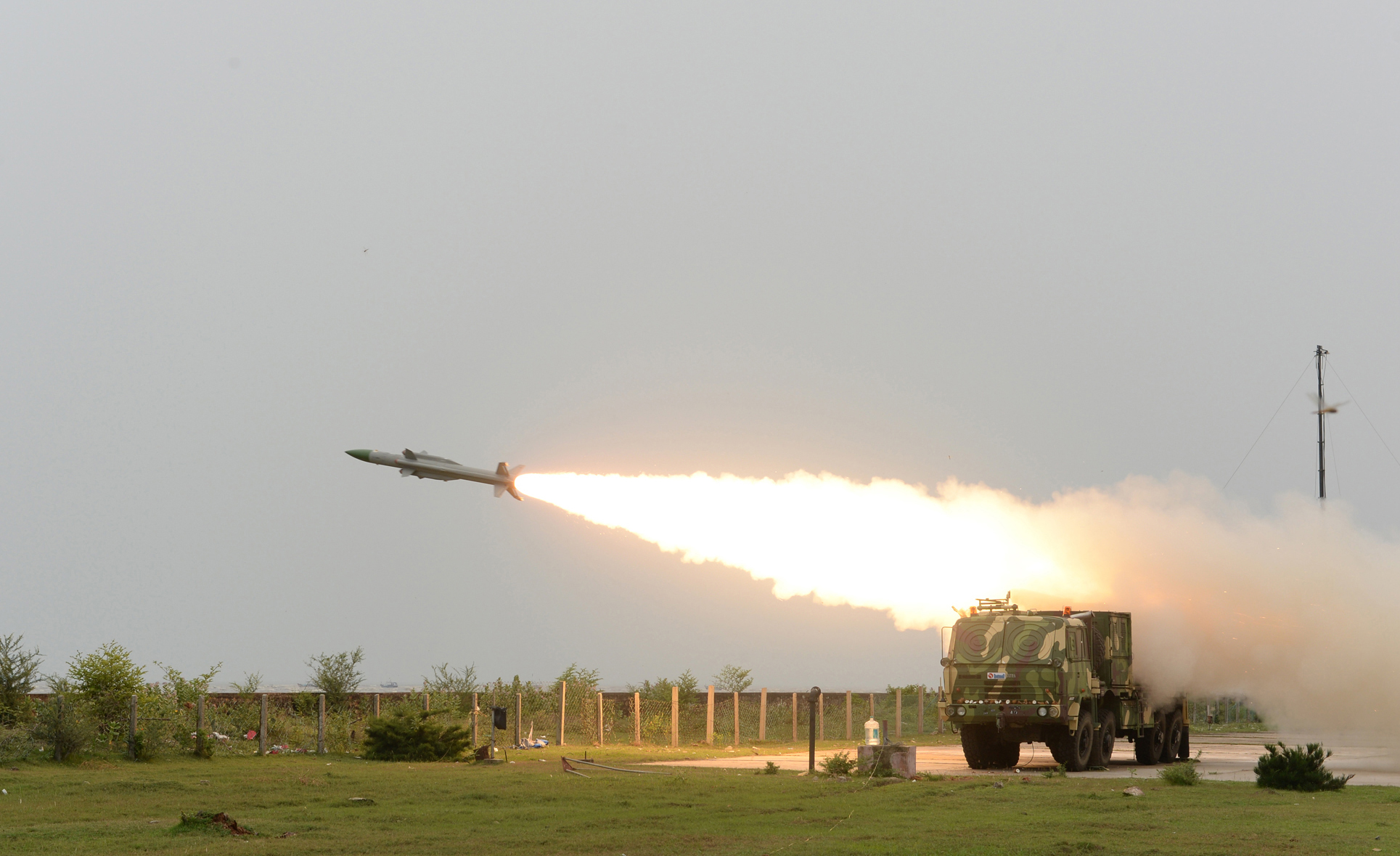
Akash missile test fired for very low altitude near boundary mission on 18 June 2014.

Akash is a surface-to-air missile with an intercept range of 25 km. It has a launch weight of 720 kg, a diameter of 35 cm and a length of 5.78 meters. Akash flies at supersonic speed, reaching around Mach 2.5. It can reach an altitude of 20 km and can be fired from both tracked and wheeled platforms. An on-board guidance system coupled with an actuator system makes the missile maneuverable up to 15g loads and a tail chase capability for end game engagement. A digital proximity fuse is coupled with a 55 kg pre-fragmented warhead, while the safety arming and detonation mechanism enables a controlled detonation sequence. A self-destruct device is also integrated. It is propelled by an Integrated Ramjet Rocket Engine. The use of a ramjet propulsion system enables sustained speeds without deceleration throughout its flight. The missile has command guidance in its entire flight.

=== Akash Mk1S ===
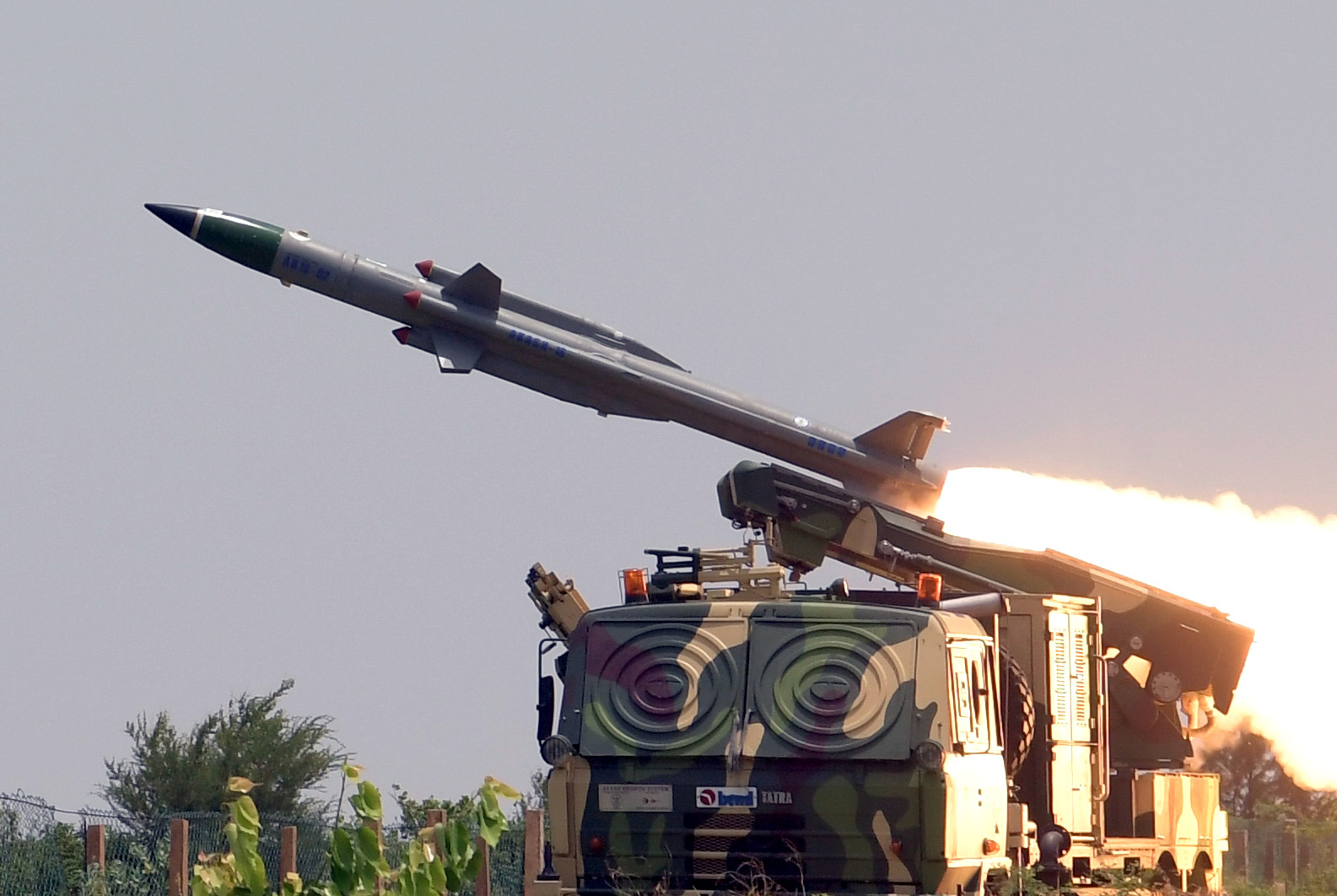
Akash-1S missile test on 27 May 2019

The Akash Mk1S was the intermediate upgrade while developing the Akash Prime variant. The Mk1S featured an indigenous active radio frequency seeker along with the original command guidance system of the Mark 1 variant. The missile was test fired in May 2019 from Integrated Test Range (ITR), Chandipur, Odisha. The additional seeker improved the ability to shootdown advanced targets along with single shot kill probability.

=== Akash Prime ===
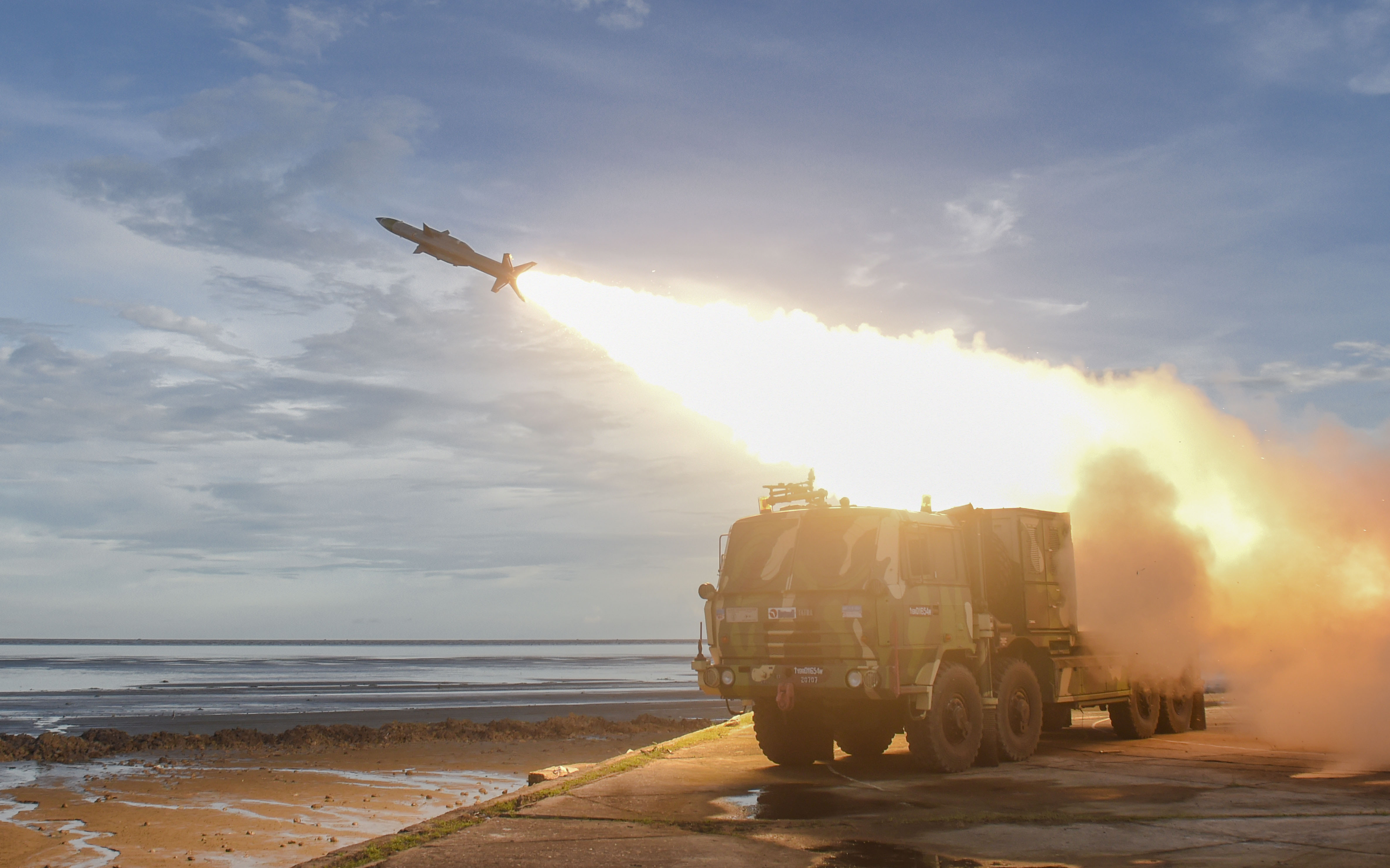
Akash-Prime SAM

The Akash Prime missile is equipped with an indigenous active radio frequency seeker giving it a 360° engagement capability with higher accuracy. The missile will be manufactured by Bharat Dynamics Limited while Bharat Electronics will produce radars, radars, control centres, simulators, associated vehicles. Akash Prime is also optimized for low temperature and high altitude operations with modified ground system and has a range of 30 km and a flight altitude of 18 km. The missile was first flight tested in September 2021 where it successfully intercepted and destroyed an unmanned aerial target mimicking enemy aircraft. The new missile and modified ground systems, collectively referred to as improved Akash Weapon System (AWS), was ordered in March 2023. The system has an indigenous content of 82% which will be increased to 93%. The missile also has "Reduced Foot Print". Akash Prime employs a combination of seeker-based terminal guidance with command guidance. The missile variant is associated with the Advanced Akash Weapon System.

=== Akash-NG ===
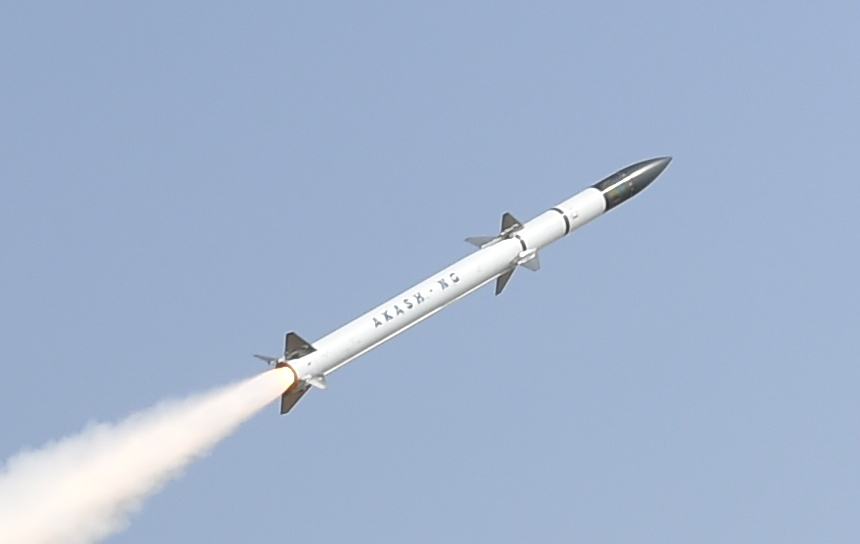
Akash-NG

A successor missile with a new design Akash – New generation abbreviated as Akash-NG was approved in September 2016 with a funding of ₹470 crore (equivalent to ₹737 crore or US$79 million in 2026) to succeed Akash and Akash-1S with improved capabilities. Akash-NG will have an improved reaction time and higher level of protection against saturation attacks. The second stage uses dual-pulse solid rocket motor which is lighter instead of air-breathing solid ramjet engine to increase the overall range from current 25–30 km to 70–80 km, an active electronically scanned array (AESA) Multi-Function Radar (MFR) and optical proximity fuze. The final user trials were conducted successfully on 23rd December 2025, with engagement of aerial targets in various scenarios and the missile is ready for induction into the Indian Armed Forces.

== Trials ==
- The first test flight of Akash missile was conducted in 1990, with development flights up to March 1997.
- Two Akash missiles from separate launchers intercepted two fast moving targets in simultaneous engagement mode in both 2005 and 2006. The trials were conducted in the Integrated Test Range (IT), Chandipur, Odisha. The group mode performance of the Central Acquisition Radar (3D-CAR) was also fully established. A total of 16 flight trials were completed by August 2006.
- Between 14 and 21 December 2007, the Indian Air Force completed user trials for this missile. The trials were declared successful after the missile hit the target on five occasions. Multiple target handling capability of Akash weapon system was demonstrated by live firing in C4I environment. The last trial was conducted at 2:15 pm IST on 21 December. Before the ten-day trial at ITR, ECCM Evaluation tests along with Field Mobility Tests were carried out at Gwalior Air Force Station and mobility trials were carried out in Pokhran. The IAF had evolved the User Trial Directive to verify the Akash's consistency. The trials included firing missiles against multiple targets which included low-flying near-range target, long-range high-altitude target, crossing and approaching target and ripple firing of two missiles from the same launcher against a low-altitude receding target.
- From 24 May to 6 June 2012, the Air Force version of the Akash missile, with a strike range of 25 km and 60 kg warhead, was tested five times from the Launch Complex-III (LC-3) of the ITR at Chandipur off the Odisha coast. These were user specific trials and a part of the routine air defence exercises of India. On 24 May 2012, India successfully test fired Akash missile to revalidate technology and operational efficacy. The target was a floating object towed by a Pilotless Target Aircraft. On 26 and 28 May, the missile were test fired again in a similar way. Two of the missile tests in May failed as the missile did not take-off as they were scheduled for successive launches. On 1 June, two Air Force variant missiles were fired back-to-back from the ITR. On 6 June at 07:57 am IST, two of the Air Force version of the missile from the LC-III of the ITR. This was the fifth trial of the missile system variant since 24 May 2012.
- On 21 and 24 February 2014, the Indian Army successfully tested the Akash missiles from the Integrated Test Range (ITR) at Chandipur. The tests were a part of pre-induction trials by the Army. On 21 February, the missile hit an approaching target towed by PTA Lakshya. On 24 February, the missile hit a receding target at a distance of 19 km. The missiles were part of the first of Production Model system being producedto equip the 2 regiments on order for the Army.
- From 23 April to 2 May 2014, the Indian Air Force tested the Akash system from LC-3 of the Integrated Test Range (ITR) at Chandipur on four days. On 23 April, the Akash missiles failed to intercept the target from the Pilotless Target Aircraft. The PTA was launched from Launch Complex-II (LC-2) of the ITR at around 2:30 pm IST. The missile is designed to pass through the "missed-distance proximity" (MDP) causing "auto-detonation" of the proximity fuse. However, the missile missed the MDP. On 26 April, Indian Air Force successfully tested 2 Akash missiles taken from the production lot against an incoming and a receding target both towed by PTA Lakshya. All the assets including missiles, launchers, radar, command centres and the drone was being controlled by Air Force personnel. The test was conducted from the ITR Complex. On 29 April, Two more trials were expected to be conducted. However, the PTA failed to take off resulting in the postponement of the tests. On 1 May, PTA Lakshya was launched from LC-2 of the ITR. The missile which was expected to intercept the target after 15 minutes, failed to take off from LC-3. The problem was speculated as perennial technical problem of the missile. This was the missile's second failure in the recent seven-test series by the IAF. On 2 May, the same tests were carried out where the missile hit para-barrel targets successfully. The test was conducted from LC-3 at 2:28 pm IST.
- On 3 August 2014, Akash missile test-fired from LC-3 of the ITR at Chandipur off the Odisha coast. The test was described as "fully successful" by the Director of ITR.
- In November 2014, training user trials of the Akash surface-to-air supersonic missiles were completed successfully on Friday. The trials were conducted for 5 consecutive days. All mission parameters, as set by the Indian Air Force (IAF) team, were validated.
- On 11 to 13 April 2015, Indian Army successfully conducted six rounds of user trials of the missile. The tests were conducted from complex 3 of the Integrated Test Range (ITR) at Chandipur in Odisha. The missiles targeted pilot less target aircraft (PTA) Lakshya, unmanned air vehicle (UAV) 'Banshee' and a para barrel target, two times each.
- On 28 January 2016, the missile was successfully test fired from Launch Complex-3 of the Integrated Test Range (ITR) at Chandipur in Odisha. As part of a user trial from the ITR, three rounds of test were carried out by the Indian Air Force (IAF) personnel aiming at para-barrel target between 11 pm and 2 pm IST. Tests were aimed at gauging the flight consistency and effectiveness of the missile, besides ascertaining the serviceability of the system in various conditions.
- On 8 March 2016, Indian Air Force (IAF) demonstrated the missile at the exercise Iron Fist 2016.
- On 28 and 29 November 2017, the Indian Air Force carried out 3 tests of the missile from Launch Complex 3 of the Integrated Test Range (ITR) against electronic targets.
- On 30 November 2017, Indian Army successfully test fired five Akash missiles at Integrated Test Range (ITR) against multiple targets.
- On 5 December 2017, another test with an indigenous radio frequency seeker was successfully carried out by the Army against a Banshee aerial drone.
- On 25 and 27 May 2019, DRDO conducted tests of the Akash Mk1S variant. Both the trials were successfully completed from the Integrated Test Range.
- On 3 December 2020, the Indian Air Force carried out 10 missile firing at Suryalanka to bolster its capability among ongoing Indo-Sino border tension. The missiles were fired to validate different scenario and majority of the missiles scored a direct kill further establishing the efficacy of Akash missile.
- On 27 September 2021, DRDO conducted maiden trials of Akash Prime variant where the missiles intercepted and destroyed an unmanned aerial target mimicking enemy aircraft. Modified ground systems and equipments derived from the original Akash Weapon System was also a part of the trials.
- On 17 December 2023, during an exercise Astraskati the Indian Air Force fired 4 missile simultaneously from 2 Akash launcher of a single firing unit neutralizing 4 UAV's simultaneously using command guidance. All target were detected and shot down at the maximum range of 30 km. This marks the Akash system as the first system in the world to successfully track and destroy 4 target using a single firing unit in command guidance. These tests were conducted from the new units ordered by Indian Air Force.
- On 31 March 2024, another test of Akash missiles were carried out successfully by Army's Western Command's 128 AD Missile Regiment.
- On 16 and 17 July 2025, Indian Army Air Defence and DRDO successfully tested Akash Prime variant in Ladakh sector at an altitude of over 15,000 ft (4,600 m). The missile scored two direct hits against very fast-moving target aircraft in a rarefied atmosphere. The trials were important for the subsequent induction of two regiments of the system into the Army.
- Akash NG completed its final user evaluation trials demonstrating engagement of aerial targets in various scenarios. The missile is ready for induction into the Indian Armed Forces.

== Status ==
The Indian Army and Air Force have a combined order worth ₹23,300 crore ($5.18 billion) as of 2014. The Air Force and the Army inducted their respective variants of Akash Weapon System (AWS) in 2012 and 2015, respectively. On 16 March 2016, Director of Defence Research and Development Laboratory (DRDL), said that India is looking to double missile production to 100 per month, up from 50 to 60.

A Comptroller and Auditor General report released in 2017 stated that because of a lack of adequate storage facilities, the life span of the missiles may be affected. In addition, there was a 30% failure rate during testing of missiles in inventory with 6 out of 20 missiles failing to hit their targets.

=== Indian Air Force ===
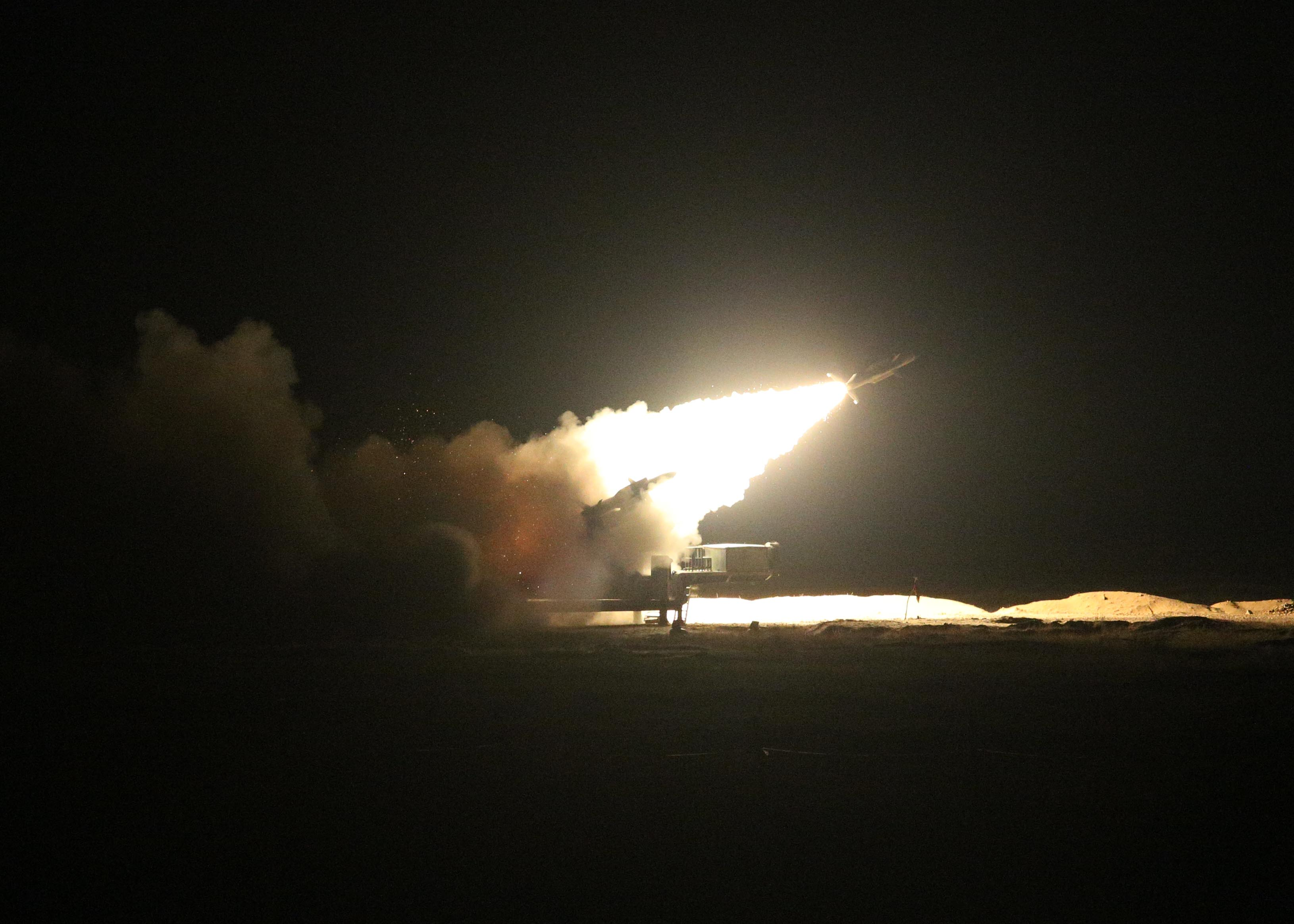
Night launch of Akash missile in Vayu Shakti Exercise 2019.

The Indian Air Force was satisfied with the performance of Akash after extensive flight trials and has decided to induct two squadrons or 4 batteries of the weapon system in 2008. An order for two squadrons were placed initially, with these being inducted in 2009. The IAF found the missile performance to be satisfactory and was expected to place orders for 16 more launchers to form two more squadrons for India's northeast theater.

In March 2009, Tata Power's Strategic Engineering Division (Tata Power SED) announced that it had secured the ₹182 crore (equivalent to ₹499 crore or US$53 million in 2026) order for 16 Akash launchers to be delivered in the next 33 months.

In January 2010, it was revealed that the Indian Air Force had ordered for 6 more squadrons. Each squadron will consist of 125 missiles, bringing the order to 750 missiles for 6 squadrons. The first two squadrons will consist of 48 missiles each while future squadrons will vary in number depending on the IAF. The additional missiles were ordered from state-run defence firm Bharat Electronics, who will act as the system integrator, at a cost of ₹4,279 crore (equivalent to ₹100 billion or US$1.1 billion in 2026).

IAF orders could reportedly rise due to the retirement of its Pechoras arsenal and if the Indo-Israeli JV to develop a MRSAM (Medium Range SAM) for the IAF face further delays, while a similar program for the Indian Navy proceeds unimpeded.

On 3 March 2012, the missile was officially inducted into Indian Air Force with a ceremony at Hyderabad.

On 10 July 2015, the Akash surface-to-air missile was formally inducted in the Indian Air Force at Gwalior.

On 1 September 2015, the Defence Acquisition Council (DAC) cleared the purchase of seven additional squadrons of the Akash missile for the Indian Air Force. On 12 September 2019, it was reported that the Cabinet Committee on Security (CCS) has cleared the procurement in late August. Later, a contract worth ₹5,400 crore (equivalent to ₹73 billion or US$780 million in 2026) for the deal was signed with Bharat Electronics the same month. The order placed was for Akash Prime missile squadrons. The delivery has been completed as of 2023–2024.

=== Indian Army ===
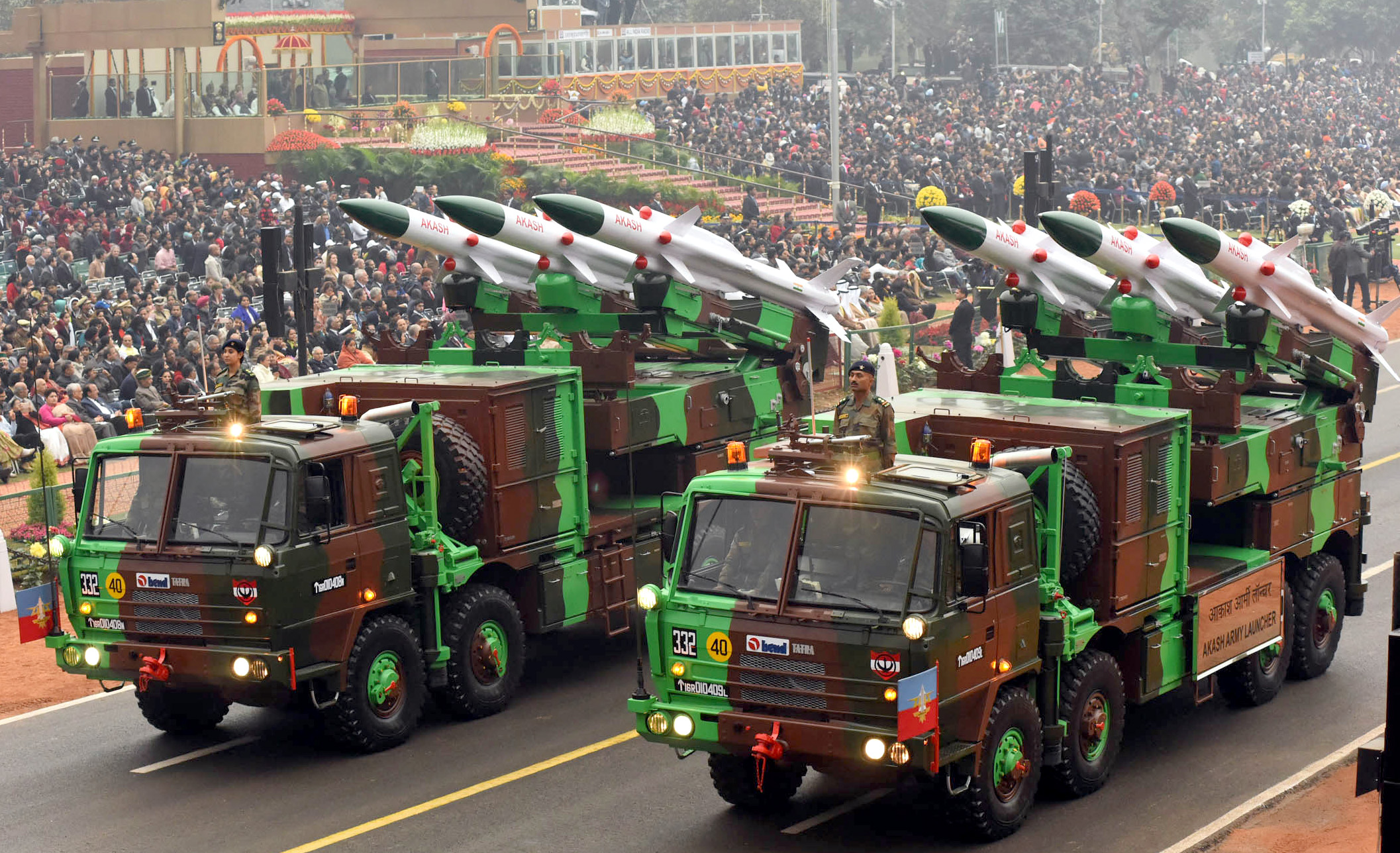
Akash missiles during Republic Day 2017 parade

In June 2010, the Defence Acquisition Council (DAC) cleared an order of the Akash missile system, valued at ₹12,500 crore (equivalent to ₹310 billion or US$3.3 billion in 2026). Bharat Dynamics (BDL) will be the system integrator and nodal production agency for the Akash Army variant. The Army plans to induct two regiments of the missile.

In March 2011, a report indicates that the Indian Army has ordered 2 Akash regiments – approximately 2,000 missiles – worth ₹14,180 crore (equivalent to ₹320 billion or US$3.4 billion in 2026). These will replace the Indian Army's 2 SA-6 Groups (25 systems with 1,500 missiles each), which were inducted between 1977 and 1979.

On 5 May 2015, Akash Missile was inducted into the Indian Army. The Army is scheduled to get two Akash regiments by 2017.

On 30 March 2016, Indian Army stated that Akash area defence missile systems did not meet its operational requirements for defending its strike corps against enemy air attacks in forward areas, and was not ordering any more regiments. The Army instead was opting for four Israeli Quick Reaction SAM (QRSAM) regiments.

In March 2017, it was reported that the procurement of two regiments of SR-SAM under a global tender has been dropped by the Defence Acquisition Council (DAC) in favour of an advanced variant of Akash Weapon System.

In May 2022, it was reported that the Indian Army is going to receive 2 regiments of Akash Prime systems. On 30 March 2023, the MoD signed contracts for procurement of 2 Regiments of improved Akash Weapon System with BDL at a cost over ₹8,160 crore (equivalent to ₹89 billion or US$950 million in 2026).

The third and fourth regiment equipped with the improved Akash Weapon System was flagged of from the BEL facility by the Defence Minister of India, Rajnath Singh, on 16 February 2026. On 26 March, Bharat Dynamics announced that it has completed the First Off Production Model (FOPM) of the Advanced Akash Weapon System. The system incorporates upgraded sub-systems. The FOPM validates the system before large-scale deliveries. The deliveries are expected to commence soon.

== Operational history ==
In June 2020, Indian Army deployed Akash air defence system along Line of Actual Control in Ladakh as tension rose with China during 2020 China–India skirmishes.

During the 2025 India-Pakistan conflict, the Indian Army and the Indian Air Force deployed Akash defence systems. According to the Indian Army's Director General of Military Operations (DGMO), the Akash system displayed “stellar performance”; stating that it played a pivotal role in neutralizing aerial threats, including drones and missiles launched by Pakistan. According to Dr. B.K. Das, Director General for Electronics & Communication Systems at DRDO, Akash performed well during Operation Sindoor.

== Export ==
On 30 December 2020, Cabinet Committee on Security (CCS) chaired by Prime Minister cleared the exports of Akash missile defence system.

=== Armenia ===
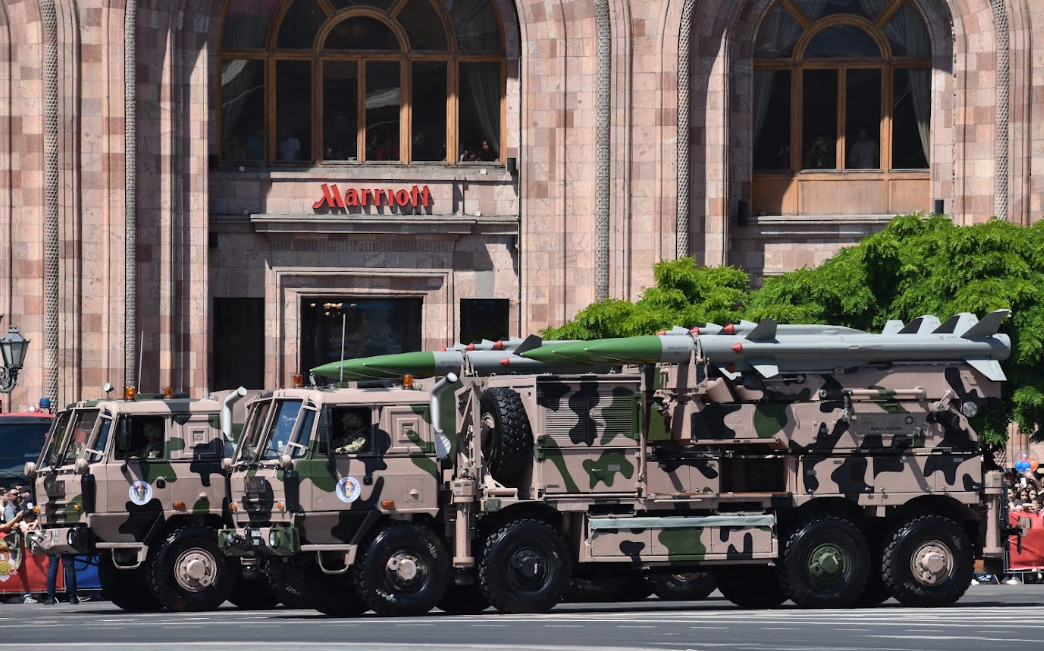
Armenian Akash in Yerevan

Armenia signed a deal, worth ₹6,000 crore (equivalent to ₹69 billion or US$740 million in 2026), with Bharat Dynamics Limited in 2022 for the supply of unknown numbers of Akash Weapon System and 15 Ashwin Air Defence Systems. The entire Air Defence Systems will be deployed within 4 to 5 years.

As of November 2023, the delivery of the Akash 1S system was expected to begin from Q2 2024 but was later shifted to 2024-end by August 2024.

The first Akash battery (Armenian variant) was finally delivered on 12 November 2024. A battery included 4 launchers and a Rajendra radar.

The second batch of Akash-1S air defense systems will be delivered in June 2025.

=== Tajikistan ===
On July 16, 2026, defense reporting by Businessworld citing official data listed Tajikistan as an export recipient of the Akash Weapon System. The export of Akash to Tajikistan was also reported by WION on August 25, 2026. On 1 October, India's Defence Secretary, Rajesh Kumar Singh, also confirmed the export.

=== Turkmenistan ===
Along with Tajikistan, Turkmenistan was identified in 2026 as an export recipient of the Akash Weapon System. On 1 October, India's Defence Secretary, Rajesh Kumar Singh, also confirmed the export.

=== Potential users ===
==== Philippines ====
As reported in March 2023, the Akash Weapon System was on offer for the Philippine Navy (operated through the Philippine Marine Corps) under their planned Shore-Based Air Defense Missile System Acquisition Project.

The Philippine government is expected to place an order for Akash SAM worth $200 million in 2026. In November 2026, it was reported that Akash is being offered to all three services of Armed Forces of the Philippines. Deal could be for five regiments and hinges on favorable financing for the Philippines.

==== Sudan ====
In 2022, Akash SAM was seen in a Sudanese Military Exhibition which showcased weapon systems operated by the Sudanese Armed Forces. In 2023, the Indian Ministry of Defence mentioned Akash in the list of multiple exported items, sparking speculations of the system's maiden export to Sudan.

==== United Arab Emirates ====
In October 2018, a report suggested that the United Arab Emirates had shown interest in the missile system.

Further, in April 2025, India officially offered the Akash missile system to UAE Armed Forces.

==== Others ====
It was also reported in the media that Belarus, Malaysia, Vietnam have shown interest in purchasing the Akash missile system. As per reports in December 2023, Egypt has also shown interest as per defence official.

=== Brazil ===
Brazil reported interest in acquiring the Akash in December 2023. However, by July 2025, Brazil dropped the negotiations to acquire Akash. This was reportedly due to the manufacturer's urge to sell an older generation system the intellectual property of which was entirely owned by them. Brazil, however, was interested in the "most up-to-date" variant. Hence, negotiations are underway with MBDA for their EMADS system. One of the factors of choosing the EMADS was the commonality of the CAMM-ER missiles procured for the Tamandaré-class frigates.

== Operators ==
Akash missile operators as of 2026.

India

- Indian Air Force – 8 Akash Mk1 and 7 Akash 1S squadrons in service (8 launchers per squadron)
  - No. 2401 Squadron at Gwalior AFS.
  - One Mk1 squadron at Lohegaon AFS.
  - Six Mk1 squadrons under the Eastern Air Command.
- Indian Army – 2 Akash Mk1 regiments in service (24 launchers per regiment). 2 Akash Prime regiments in service.
  - 128 AD Missile Regiment
  - 27 AD Missile Regiment (Amritsar Airfield)

Armenia

- Armenian Armed Forces – 1 battery (4 launchers) delivered as of November 2024. The second batch of Akash-1S air defense systems will be delivered in June 2025. Unknown numbers on order.

Turkmenistan

- India exported the missiles on October 2026.

Tajikistan

- India exported the missiles on October 2026.

=== Failed bids ===
Brazil – Brazil reported interest in acquiring the Akash in December 2023. However, by July 2025, Brazil was pursuing the EMADS system from MBDA which shares the CAMM-ER missiles deployed onboard Tamandaré-class frigates.

== See also ==
- Trishul – (India)
- Maitri – (India)
- Project Kusha – (India)
- Barak 8 – (India, Israel)
- Akash-NG – (India)
- VL-SRSAM – (India)
- Advanced Air Defence – (India) (AAD)
- Prithvi Air Defence – (India) (PAD)
- Anant Shastra – (India)
