= 128 AD Missile Regiment =

128 Air Defence Missile Regiment
- Active: 1951 – present
- Country: India
- Allegiance: India
- Branch: Indian Army
- Type: Air Defence
- Size: Regiment
- Part of: Western Command
- Nickname: Sky Gladiators
- Motto: Sky high excellence
- Colors: Sky Blue and Red
- Equipment: Akash surface-to-air missiles

Insignia
- Abbreviation: 128 AD Msl Regt

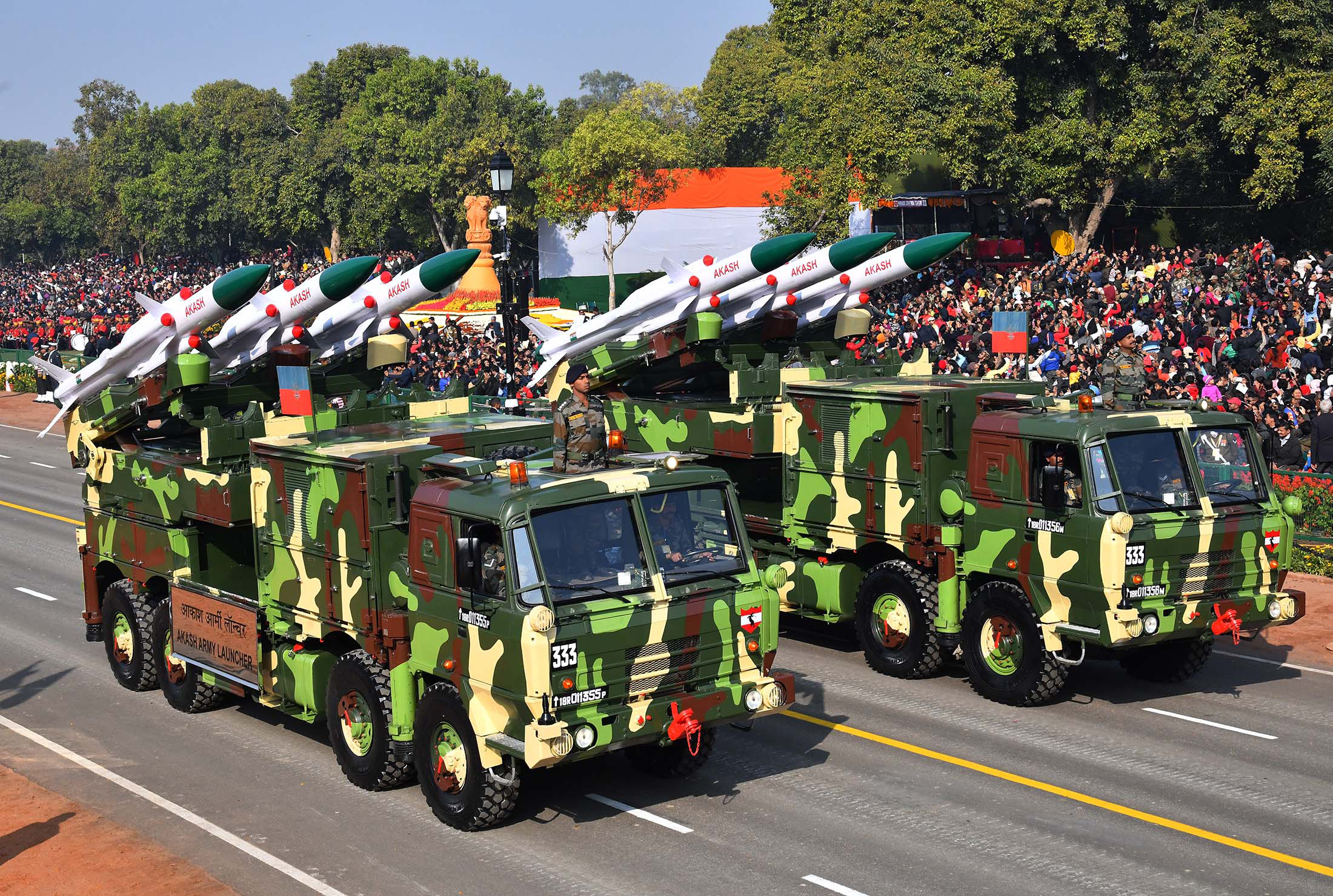
Akash missiles of 128 AD Missile Regt during the 2019 Republic Day parade

128 Air Defence Missile Regiment is an Air Defence regiment of the Indian Army.

== Formation ==
The regiment was raised on 1 April 1951 as a territorial army regiment at Arakkonam, Tamil Nadu. The first commanding officer was Lieutenant Colonel Atma Singh Pannu, MBE.

== History ==
At the time of its formation, the regiment was equipped with Bofors 40 mm L-60 anti-aircraft guns. The unit served at Arakkonam, Ferozepur and Madhopur.

On 15 September 1973, the unit was converted into a regular air defence regiment. It was equipped with L/70 guns and SFM radar. It served in Bombay, Udhampur, Jamnagar, Ferozepur, Srinagar and Surat.

The war cry of the regiment is Ek Sau Atthai Karo Chadhai, Ek Sau Atthai Do or Die.

On 31 March 2024, another test of Akash missiles were carried out successfully 128 AD Missile Regiment.

== Operations ==
The regiment has taken part in the following operations-

- Indo-Pak War (1965): Operation Riddle- The regiment was the first Territorial Army unit to see action. It was deployed in the Jammu and Akhnoor area.
- Indo-Pakistani War of 1971: Lance Havildar Kans Raj was awarded the Vir Chakra for shooting down a F-86 Sabre.
- Bombay Police Riots: 1982
- Bhiwandi Thane Riots: 1984
- Operation Trident: 26 January 1987 to 15 April 1987.
- Operation Rakshak: 1987 to 1992
- Operation Vijay: 26 May 1999 to 31 October 1999.
- Operation Parakram: 17 December 2001 to 18 December 2002.
- Operation Rakshak: July 2003 to July 2006.

== Honours and awards ==
- The regiment was awarded the Director General Army Air Defence's (DGAAD) unit appreciation award during its tenure in Srinagar for its use of air defence guns in direct firing role at the Line of Control (LoC).
- In addition to the Vir Chakra won during the 1971 war, the regiment has been awarded 14 COAS Commendation Cards, 2 VCOAS Commendation Cards and 8 GOC-in-C Commendation Cards.
- The regiment participated with its Akash surface-to-air missiles in the Republic Day parades of 2019, 2020 and 2022.
