= Chandipur, Odisha =

Chandipur
- Town
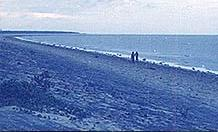
- A view of the Chandipur beach during high-tide

- Location in Odisha, India Chandipur (India)
- Coordinates: 21.47°N 87.02°E
- Country: India
- State: Odisha
- District: Balasore

Area
  - Total: 0.20773 km^{2} (0.08021 sq mi)
- Elevation: 3 m (9.8 ft)

Languages
  - Official: Odia
- Time zone: UTC+5:30 (IST)
- Vehicle registration: OD 01
- Website: odisha.gov.in

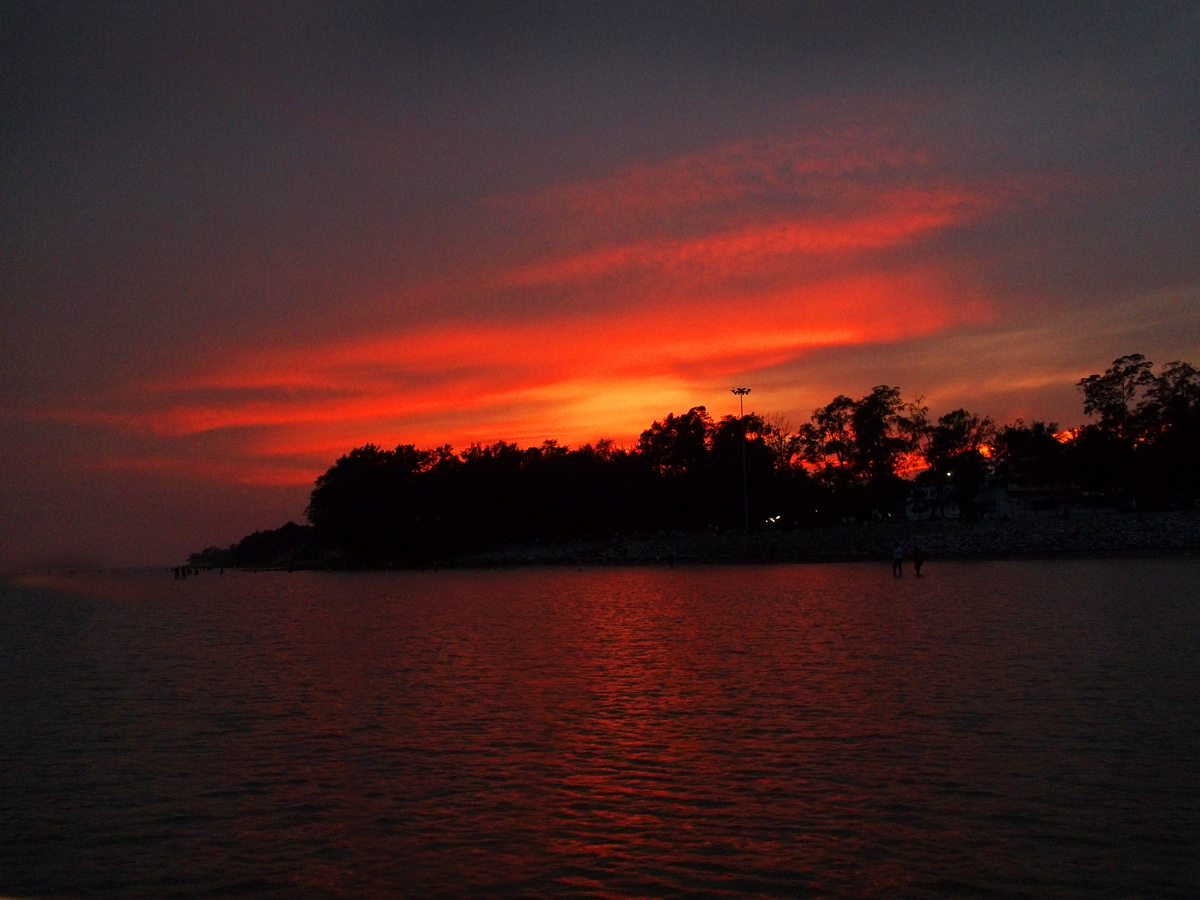
Sunset at Chandipur beach

Chandipur is a resort town in Balasore District, Odisha, India. The town is located on the shore of Bay of Bengal and is approximately 16 kilometers from Balasore Railway Station. Chandipur beach is unique in a way that the water recedes up to 5 kilometers during the low tide. Due to its unique circumstances, the beach supports biodiversity. Horseshoe crab is also found here on the beach towards Mirzapur, the nearby fishing market and community at the confluence of the Budhabalanga River (Balaramgadi).

== Geography ==
Chandipur is located at 21.47°N 87.02°E. It has an average elevation of 3 m (9.8 ft). This town is 51.330 acres (0.20773 km^{2}) in size. Chandipur beach can be submerged during high tide.

=== Normal Indian weather ===
Summer temperatures range 25–40 degrees Celsius, while the Winter range is 17–27 degree Celsius. Tourism season is typically from November to March.

== Ministry of Defence ==
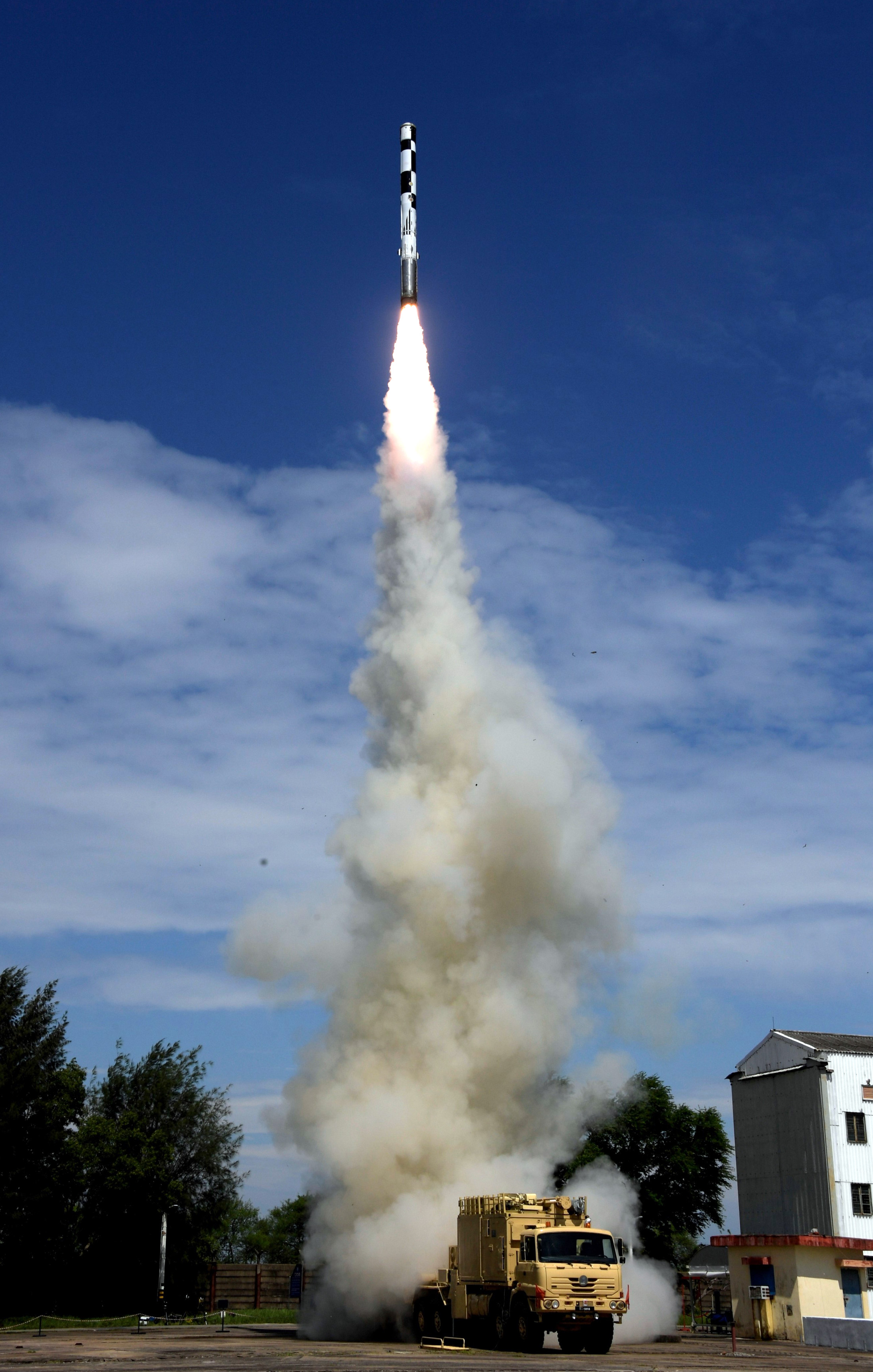
BrahMos supersonic cruise missile successfully test-fired from the Integrated Test Range, Chandipur (2019)

Chandipur is also the location of DRDO's only missile testing lab, i.e., the Integrated Test Range (ITR). A number of Indian missiles have been tested and launched from the ITR, including nuclear-capable Prithvi, Agni and Shaurya ballistic missiles, as well as Akash and Barak 8 surface-to-air missiles.

== Transport ==
Chandipur can be reached by travelling up to Baleswar by rail or road and then thereafter catching a bus, auto or taxi. Road access to Baleswar is via National Highway 16 (NH-16). Chandipur sea beach is 16 km away from Balasore railway station.

Also, one can avail the local guide & trekker service to see the major locations of Panchalinegeswar, Khirachora Gopinath temple, Chandipur Beach, Emami Jagannath temple, & Nilgiri Jagannath temple.

== Food ==
Many types of seafood are available in hotels and restaurants. Fish is especially inexpensive here.
