= Bharat Dynamics Limited =

Indian defense company

- The force behind peace
- Type: Public Sector Undertaking
- Traded as: BSE: 541143; NSE: BDL
- Industry: Defence
- Founded: 1970; 56 years ago
- Headquarters: Bharat Dynamics Limited Corporate Office, Financial District, Nanakramguda, Hyderabad, India
- Area served: India
- Key people: Commodore A Madhavarao (Chairman & MD)
- Revenue: ▲₹3,695 crore (US$380 million) (2025)
- Operating income: ▲₹2,828.81 crore (US$290 million) (2020)
- Net income: ▲₹1,793.83 crore (US$190 million) (2020)
- Total assets: ▼₹5,468.41 crore (US$570 million) (2019)
- Total equity: ▲₹2,268.54 crore (US$240 million) (2019)
- Owner: Government of India (74.93%)
- Number of employees: 3,030 (March 2019)
- Parent: Ministry of Defence, Government of India
- Website: bdl-india.in

Bharat Dynamics Limited (BDL) is one of India's manufacturers of ammunitions and missile systems. It was founded in 1970 in Hyderabad, India. BDL has been working in collaboration with the Defence Research and Development Organisation and foreign original equipment manufacturers (OEMs) for manufacturing and supplying various missiles and allied equipment to Indian Armed Forces. The company began by producing a first-generation anti-tank guided missile — the French SS11B1. While fulfilling its basic role as a weapons system manufacturer, BDL has built up in-house research and development capabilities, primarily focusing on design and engineering activities. BDL has three manufacturing units, located at Kanchanbagh, Hyderabad; Bhanur, Medak district, and Visakhapatnam, Andhra Pradesh.

Two new units are planned at Ibrahimpatnam, Ranga Reddy district, Telangana and Amravati, Maharashtra.

== History ==
India began to develop indigenous missiles through the Integrated Guided Missile Development Programme (IGMDP), which allowed BDL to be closely involved with the programme, wherein it was identified as the prime production agency. This opened up a plethora of opportunities to assimilate advanced manufacturing and programme management technologies and skills. Responding to the concurrent engineering approaches adopted by the Defence Research and Development Organisation (DRDO) in the Integrated Guided Missile Development Programme (IGMDP), BDL was seen as a reliable and trust worthy partner, and resulted in the induction of India's first state-of-the-art surface-to-surface missile Prithvi. BDL has delivered Prithvi to the three services as per requirements. BDL has forayed into the field of underwater weapon systems and air-to-air missiles, and associated equipment, with technology support from the DRDO and other players in this domain.

== Operations ==
BDL has been consistently incurring profits and has been nominated as a Mini Ratna – Category-I Company by the Government of India. Showing steady progress in its operations over the years, BDL achieved a record sales turnover of ₹1,075 crore in 2012–13. BDL has orders worth over ₹1,800 crore. Keeping pace with the modernisation of the Indian Armed Forces, BDL is poised to enter new avenues of manufacturing covering a wide range of weapon systems such as: surface-to-air missiles, air defence systems, heavy weight torpedoes, air-to-air missiles, making it a defence equipment manufacturer. BDL has also entered the arena of refurbishment of old missiles.

== Products and services ==
=== Indigenous missiles ===
BDL is the nodal agency for the production of missiles developed by India. The first such missile that entered production of dynamics with BDL was the Prithvi missile.

BDL manufactures a range of missiles for the Indian Armed Forces some prominent products are listed below:

- Agni

In 1998, BDL produced Agni-I, which was inducted into the Indian Armed Forces. BDL also manufactures other missiles and systems for the Indian Armed Forces

- Akash

Akash (Sanskrit: आकाश Ākāś "Sky") is a medium-range surface-to-air missile defence system developed by the Defence Research and Development Organisation (DRDO), and supported by Ordnance Factories Board and Bharat Electronics (BEL) in India. The missile system can target aircraft up to 30 km away, at altitudes up to 18,000 m. A pre-fragmented warhead could potentially give the missile the capability to destroy both aircraft and warheads from ballistic missiles. It is in operational service with the Indian Army and the Indian Air Force.

- Advanced Light Weight Torpedo

It can be launched from a Ship, Helicopter, or Submarine and is available in both warshot/exercise modes. Homing can be passive/active/mixed modes. It has multiple search pattern capabilities.

- Counter Measures Dispensing Systems

Counter Measures Dispensing System (CMDS) is a chaff and flare dispensing system. CMDS is an airborne defensive system providing self-protection to the aircraft by passive ECM against radar-guided and IR-seeking, air and ground-launched missiles. Protection to the aircraft is achieved by misguiding the missiles by dispensing chaff, and/or flare payloads.

- MILAN 2T

This is a second-generation, semi-automatic, tube-launched, optically tracked missile with a tandem warhead.

The Indian Army ordered 4,100 MILAN-2T missiles from France at a cost of ₹592 crore (US$122.3 million) on 27 January 2009. The deal was cleared after the 2008 Mumbai attacks. By then, BDL had already started licensed production of MILAN and Konkurs missiles at an annual rate of 4.5 lakh units. On 8 March 2016 and 19 March 2021, additional orders for MILAN-2T missiles from BDL was placed with the latter worth ₹1,188 crore (US$160.72 million) for 4,960 missiles.

The missiles were first urgently acquired from France

- Konkurs – M

This is a second-generation, semi-automatic, anti-tank, tube-launched, optically tracked, wire-guided, and aerodynamically controlled missile. It is designed to destroy moving and stationary armoured targets with reactive armour at a range of 75 to 4000 metres.

Salient Features: The Tandem warhead is simple in operation and immune to Electronic Countermeasures. High hit and kill probability, Portable and para-droppable. Hermetically sealed, ensuring long storage life.

Around 15,000 Konkurs-M were ordered in 2008 from Russia for ₹1,380 crore (US$317.21 million). Another 10,000 Konkurs-M was cleared for US$250 million in 2012. Additional contracts was signed on 8 January 2019 and 2 February 2022 for ₹7.6 billion (US$107.92 million) and ₹3,131.82 crore (US$398.43 million), respectively. The latter was to be executed within 3 years at BDL's Bhanur facility. BDL reportedly produces the 9K111-1M system with a 9M113 anti-tank missile and a 9P135M-1 launcher. Used on BMP-2 Sarath as well as man-portable ground launcher. The systems were upgraded with Tonbo Imaging's cooled, longwave Infrared (LWIR) thermal imagers known as Sarisa.

- Invar

Invar is a weapon fired from the gun barrel of a T-90 Tank. The missile has a semi-automatic control system, tele-orienting in the laser beam. This is a high-velocity jamming immune missile with a tandem warhead designed to defeat explosive reactive armour. Intended to destroy stationary and moving targets with speeds up to 70 km/h.

An order worth ₹2,905.70 crore (equivalent to ₹30 billion or US$310 million in 2026) was placed on 13 November 2025 to equip the T-90 tanks of the Indian Army.
