= Pulsed rocket motor =

Solid-fuel rocket motor that can restart

A pulsed rocket motor is typically defined as a multiple-pulse solid-fuel rocket motor. This design overcomes difficulties shutting down and reigniting solid propellant motors. The pulse rocket motor allows the motor to be burned in segments (or pulses) that burn until completion of that segment. The next segment can be ignited on command by either an onboard algorithm or in a pre-planned sequence. All of the segments are contained in a single rocket motor case, as opposed to staged rocket motors.

The pulsed rocket motor is made by pouring each segment of propellant separately. Between each segment is a barrier that prevents the other segments from burning until ignited. At ignition of a second pulse, the burning of the propellant generally destroys the barrier.

The benefit of the pulsed rocket motor is that, by the on-command ignition of the subsequent pulses, near-optimal energy management of the propellant burn can be accomplished. Each pulse can have a different thrust level and burn time, and achieve a different specific impulse depending on the type of propellant used, its burn rate, its grain design, and the current nozzle throat diameter.

== Examples ==
Solid rocket motors are prized in military for their long shelf lives, but at the same time some control of the burn is desired. For example, the range of a missile can be extended by separating the burn into two pulses, one starting at launch and the other much later in its journey. Doing so would reduce the velocity of the missile during the majority of the course, therefore reducing losses to drag. The Russian R-77M air-to-air missile uses a dual-pulse motor.

The American SM-3 surface-to-air missile uses a dual-pulse motor in its third stage, one before nosecone ejection, the other after. The kinetic kill vehicle of the SM-3 also uses a multi-charge solid fuel design, though the fuel is used here to feed a gas generator.

== See also ==
- Pulse jet engine, a very simple jet engine which used ignited "pulses" of gas or atomized fuel for propulsion.
- Nuclear pulse propulsion
- Pulsed nuclear thermal rocket
