= Trishul (missile) =

Retired Indian missile system

- Trishul SAM diagram
- Type: Surface-to-air missile
- Place of origin: India

Production history
- Designer: Defence Research and Development Organisation
- Manufacturer: Bharat Dynamics Limited; Bharat Heavy Electricals Limited

Specifications
- Mass: 130 kg (290 lb)
- Length: 3 m (9.8 ft)
- Diameter: 200 cm (79 in)
- Warhead: Pre-fragmented warhead
- Warhead weight: 15 kg (33 lb)
- Engine: Dual-thrust solid-propellant rocket
- Propellant: Solid fuel
- Operational range: 300 m (980 ft) to 9 km (5.6 mi); 11 km (6.8 mi)
- Maximum speed: Mach 2
- Guidance system: Command to line-of-sight
- Launch platform: BMP-2 chassis; Truck; Surface ship

Trishul (lit. 'Trident') was a low-level quick-reaction short range surface-to-air missile developed in India by the Defence Research and Development Organisation (DRDO) as part of the Integrated Guided Missile Development Programme (IGMDP). It can also be used as an anti-sea skimmer from naval ship against low flying missile, attack helicopter and aircraft.

In 2008, Minister of Defence A. K. Antony officially announced the closure of the project on a written reply to Rajya Sabha after completion of Technology Demonstration (TD) phase. The development cost of Trishul Project was ₹282.68 crore (equivalent to ₹860 crore or US$89 million in 2026).

== History and development ==
The Trishul missile project was commissioned in 1983 as a part of Integrated Guided Missile Development Programme. The primary objective was to produce short range surface to air missile with a reaction time below 6 seconds. In 1985, Trishul made its first unguided flight from Satish Dhawan Space Centre, Sriharikota. This flight also marked the first full length flight test of the IGMDP programme as well. The missile made its first full range guided flight in 1989 but without television guidance (TVM) which was originally planned. The Indian Army and Indian Air Force (IAF) wanted Trishul to replace the Soviet-era 9K33 Osa. On the other hand, Indian Navy wanted to purchase Barak 1 and Kashtan CIWS for point-defence role since Pakistan began acquiring Harpoon and Exocet from 1980s. By the late 1990s, DRDO pushed Trishul as an alternative to Barak 1 for Indian Navy. One of the biggest challenge faced by DRDO in this undertaking was to make Trishul skim just 5 meters above the sea waves at supersonic speed.

The project was planned to be completed by 1992 and to be fitted in Brahmaputra-class frigates as an anti-sea skimmer. In 1992, the missile was successfully fired reaching Mach 2 speed following a predetermined trajectory against a target mounted 7 meter above sea but variation in altimeter led to test failure. In 1997, the associated radar systems for detecting the incoming sea-skimmer were operational at INS Dronacharya, but Indian Navy expressed its displeasure in the developmental delay of Trishul for the Brahmaputra-class frigates and finally opted for Barak 1. Trishul was unable to complete all the static trials from a fixed launcher until 1998. By May 1998, Bharat Dynamics Limited (BDL) was able to produce Trishul while the 27 tonne launch system was developed by Bharat Heavy Electricals Limited (BHEL). The first missile produced by BDL was test fired against Northrop BQM-74 Chukar in June. A few units were put into service with the Indian Army and Indian Airforce in 1999 to validate the missile subsystems.

Upon reviewed by DRDO and the Indian Armed Forces in October 2001, the missile system was found deficient as the tracking radar beam was getting intermittent breaks resulting in the missile missing the target and the heavy BMP-2 chassis did not meet the General Staff Qualitative Requirements (GSQRs) for swift mobility due to heavy weight. On 25 January 2002, the naval variant of Trishul was test fired from INS Dronacharya but failed at sea-skimming capability.

In 2003, Government of India announced that the missile will be a technology demonstrator and de-linked it from Integrated Guided Missile Development Programme. But Ministry of Defence (MoD) was not interested in downgrading the Trishul Missile project. After modification in guidance, sub-systems and propellant composition, four missiles in full combat configuration were launched from BMP-2 from June 22 to June 25, 2003. The test achieved miss distance against moving targets above the specified requirement of the Indian Armed Forces. All the sub-systems, air frames, controls, integrated with ground control system of the combat vehicle worked well. By this time Trishul became more of a research and development oriented project instead of a user driven one backed by the armed forces. Trishul was successfully test fired from Integrated Test Range (ITR) on 10 February, 26 March and 27 March 2004. On 5 October 2005, Trishul fired towards the sea from ITR was able to hit a pilot-less target aircraft.

Until October 2006, 80 flight tests were already completed and DRDO was in dialogue with the IAF for user trials and induction. In 2006, Minister of Defence Pranab Mukherjee granted one-year extension to Trishul project. Due to project delays, and modification of GSQRs and operational requirements over time, Trishul no longer able to meet the need of the end users. For continuation of the project and funding, it was proposed that the missile will be deployed in certain locations to conduct training, fire control, and air defence practice. As per Ministry of Defence (MoD), Trishul Project met the performance parameters set by the original GSQRs but failed to achieve the perfect three-beam guidance and development of millimeter-wave active radar homing seeker. The team of 200 scientists working on Trishul were reassigned for Barak 8, a joint project between DRDO and Israel Aerospace Industries (IAI). IAF finally selected SPYDER as a temporary alternative to Trishul. To fulfill IAF requirement, DRDO made another attempt with MBDA on a joint project called Maitri. But it got cancelled due to lack of interest. All the proven technologies and learning from Trishul later helped DRDO in the development of the QRSAM missile for the Indian Army and VL-SRSAM missile for the Indian Air Force and the Indian Navy. The People who worked on Trishul and Barak 8 termed the basic design flaw as one of the many reasons behind the project failure.

== Characteristics ==
Trishul was designed to operate on a CLOS system (command-to-line-of-sight), whereupon a three different radar beams would converge at the target and the missile would follow it. The missile was entirely guided by shipborne systems following launch and could incorporated an additional tracking radar or an electro-optical system for additional precision. The system was conceived with a roughly 5.5-kilogram fragmentation warhead and a flight speed near Mach 2.

The missile had a range between 300 m (980 ft) to 9 km (5.6 mi). DRDO also made an enhanced 11 km (6.8 mi) range variant for the Indian Air Force. It is powered by a Dual-thrust propulsion stage using high-energy solid propellant. Trishul weighs 130 kg (290 lb) and is capable of carrying a 15 kg (33 lb) warhead. Trishul is 3 m in length and 20 cm in diameter. The missile can be employed against sea skimmers with a fire control radar. Trishul flies at supersonic speed. It has a low altitude radio altimeter and height lock loop control.

== See also ==
- Maitri (missile) – (India)
- Anant Shastra – (India)
- VL-SRSAM – (India)
- HISAR (surface to air missile system) – (Turkey)
- Raad (air defense system) – (Iran)
- Sayyad-4 – (Iran)
- Mersad – (Iran)
- Bavar-373 – (Iran)
- Khordad 15 (air defense system) – (Iran)
