= Project 18-class destroyer =

Indian stealth guided missile destroyers

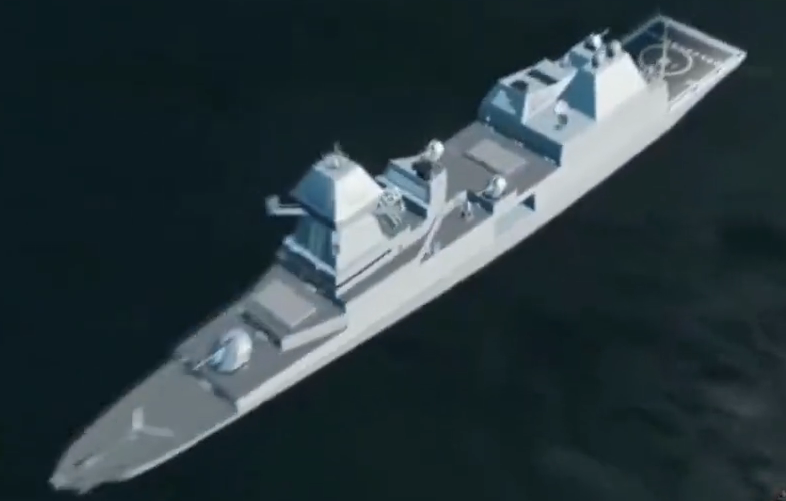
- A concept representation of Project-18 class destroyer

Class overview
- Name: Project 18A class
- Operators: Indian Navy
- Preceded by: Visakhapatnam class; Project 15C
- Built: 2035 onwards (expected)
- Planned: 10-12

General characteristics
- Type: Stealth guided-missile destroyer
- Displacement: 10,000 t (9,800 long tons) (standard); 14–15,000 t (14–14,763 long tons) (full load)
- Length: 180 meters (590 ft 7 in)
- Propulsion: Integrated Electric Propulsion
- Armament: Total 144 VLS cells and 8 slant launchers; Surface-to-air missile; VL-SRSAM; MRSAM; M2 ERADS (PGLRSAM); Cruise missiles; LR-LACM (Subsonic); BrahMos-ER (Supersonic); BrahMos-II; ET-LDHCM (Hypersonic); Anti-submarine missile; SMART missile; Anti-submarine warfare; Varunastra (torpedo); DRDO Anti Torpedo Torpedo (ATT)
- Aircraft carried: Indian Multi Role Helicopter; Sikorsky SH-60 Seahawk; Schiebel Camcopter S-100

The Project 18A destroyer, also referred to as Next Generation Destroyers (NGD), are a class of planned stealth guided-missile destroyers to be built for the Indian Navy (IN). The class will be a follow-on for Visakhapatnam-class destroyer which is in service. The class is a part of Next Generation series of future frontline surface combatants of the Indian Navy which includes the Project 17B-class frigate or Next Generation Frigates (NGF) and the Next Generation Corvettes (NGC).

== History ==
=== Background ===
In December 2023, the then Vice Chief of Naval Staff, Vice Admiral Sanjay Jasjit Singh revealed that a class of advanced Next Generation Destroyers (NGD) or Project 18 destroyers is being designed by the Warship Design Bureau (WDB). As of then, the design and contract signing for construction was expected to be completed by 5 years. The delivery was to be completed within 5-10 years of contract signing. The ships will have a standard displacement of 10,000 tonnes. The leading contenders for the deal were Mazagon Dock Shipbuilders (MDL) and Garden Reach Shipbuilders & Engineers (GRSE). The project, worth over $10 billion, includes a total of around 10-12 ships are to be built in two phases. MDL has also floated a tender to construct a floating dry dock near Nhava Sheva port for ₹3,000 crore (equivalent to ₹35 billion or US$360 million in 2026) in 2022. This will assist them for the construction of these warships. Reports also suggested that the ships will feature an indigenous S-band primary fire control radar developed by DRDO. This will replace EL/M-2248 MF-STAR radars used on previous ships like Kolkata-class and Visakhapatnam-class destroyer. They will also feature advanced indigenous weapon systems and an integrated electric propulsion (IEP).

=== Development ===
In 15 January 2025, the project was in the planning stage and implementation was expected to begin in few years. As of September 2025, the first phase of the NGD project including four 10,000 tonne destroyers are pending to be cleared by the Defence Ministry.

As per official sources, in November 2025, the Navy expects to receive the Acceptance of Necessity (AoN) approval from the defence ministry's Defence Acquisition Council (DAC) for at least five 11,000 tonne destroyers in this fiscal year. The contract signing is expected within two years. The Navy has reportedly tested multiple smart technologies, to be integrated on these destroyers, onboard a trial platform. However, the project was yet to receive Acceptance of Necessity (AoN) from the Ministry of Defence in March 2026.

A report in November 2025 indicated the possibility of a Project 15C preceding the NGD programme, which will feature a clean slate design. A report by NDTV in July 2026 confirmed that both the NGD, referred to as the Project 18A destroyers, and the Project 15C are progressing. The P18A programme will deliver six ships with a displacement of 14–15,000 tonnes. The request for proposal (RFP) is now expected in 2029 with construction expected to start within eight years. The destroyer projects will be complemented by six Project 17B frigates.

The Defence Acquisition Council (DAC) accorded the in-principle approval for the P-18A destroyer project for the Indian Navy on 26 October 2026 at a cost of over ₹75,000 crore (US$7.8 billion). The deliveries of the over-10,000-tonne destroyers would commence around 5 to 10 years after the contract is signed.

== Design ==
=== Armament ===
The class of warship might be equipped with 72-cell vertical launching systems (three 6 × 4 configuration) at the bow, a similar 72–48 cell VLS in the aft along with 8 slant launchers (2 × quad launchers) in the midship region. This implies a total of 120–144 VLS and 8 slant launchers for each ship. As per several reports, the ship will be operating surface-to-air missiles and anti-ballistic missiles (under Project Kusha) as well as surface-to-surface missiles and anti-ship missiles including VL-SRSAM, MR-SAM, PGLRSAM system, BrahMos-ER, BrahMos 2 hypersonic cruise missile, SMART and LR-LACM. These weapon systems will be equipped in Universal Vertical Launcher Modules (UVLMs). Other defence mechanisms like directed-energy weapon (DEW) and Maareech ATDS may be included.

The Universal Vertical Launcher Module (UVLM) originally developed by BrahMos Aerospace, and Larsen & Toubro for launching BrahMos missiles is now being integrated with other under-development missile systems like the LR-LACM and SMART.

== See also ==
=== Other references to the Indian Navy ===
- Future of the Indian Navy
- List of destroyers of India
- List of active Indian Navy ships

=== Other destroyers of comparable configurations and capabilities ===
- Ticonderoga-class cruiser – a class of guided-missile cruisers being currently operated by the United States Navy.
- DDG(X) – a class of guided-missile destroyers being currently under development by the United States Navy.
- Type 83 destroyer - a class of guided-missile destroyers being currently under development by the Royal Navy.
- Type 055 destroyer – is a class of stealth guided-missile destroyers (guided-missile cruisers per NATO/OSD standard) being constructed for the Chinese People's Liberation Army Navy.
- Sejong the Great-class destroyer – a class of guided-missile destroyers operated by the Republic of Korea Navy.
- Zumwalt-class destroyer - a class of stealth guided-missile destroyers operated by the United States Navy.
- KDDX-class destroyer - a class of stealth guided-missile destroyers being currently under development for Republic of Korea Navy.
