= VL-SRSAM =

Indian surface to air missile series

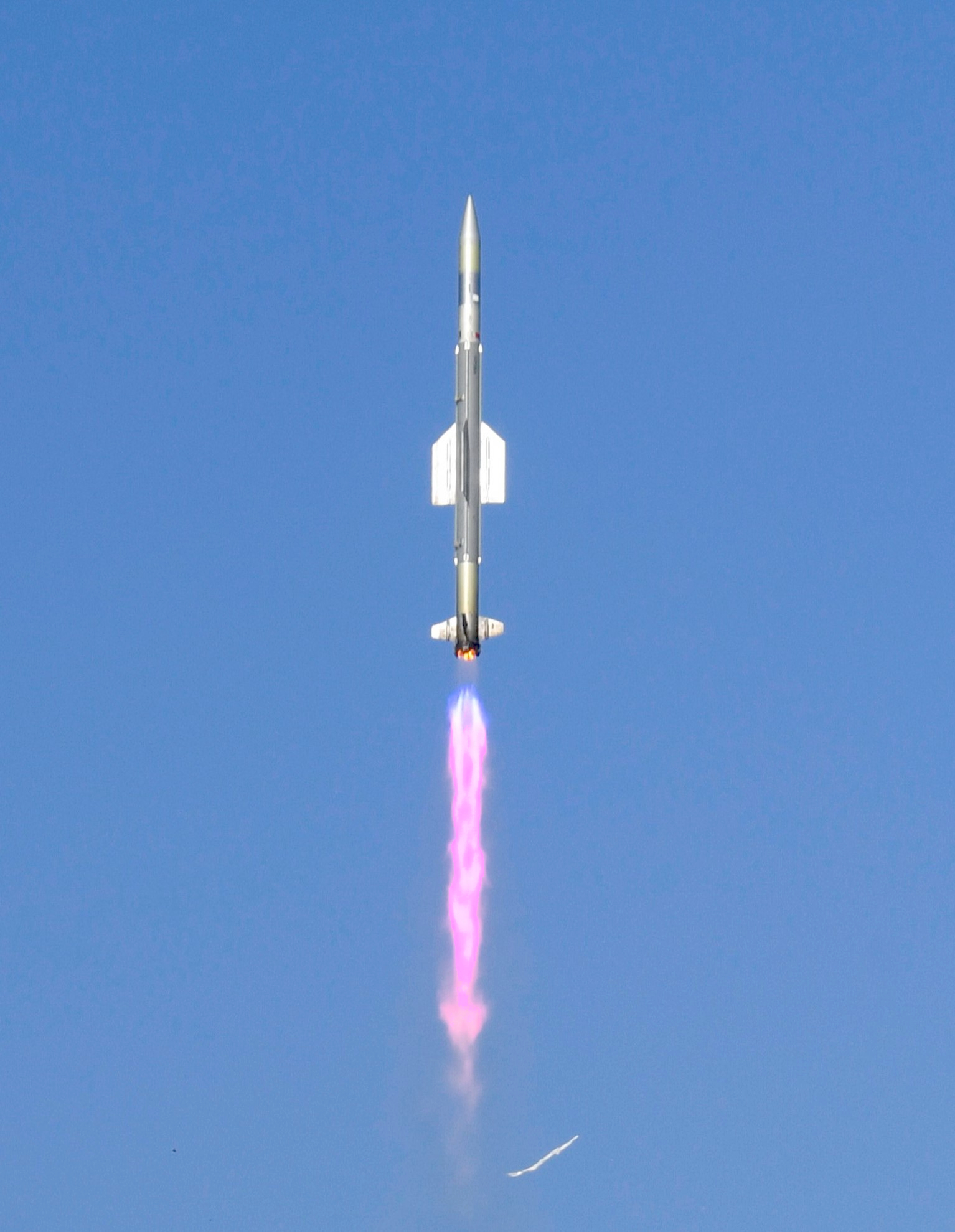
- VL-SRSAM being tested from vertical launch system by DRDO and Indian Navy.
- Type: Surface-to-air missile
- Place of origin: India

Service history
- In service: 2022
- Used by: Indian Navy

Production history
- Designer: Defence Research and Development Laboratory
- Manufacturer: Bharat Dynamics Limited

Specifications
- Mass: 170 kg (370 lb)
- Length: 3.80 m (12.5 ft)
- Diameter: 178 mm (7.0 in)
- Wingspan: 508 mm (20.0 in)
- Warhead: High-explosive pre-fragmented HMX/PU
- Warhead weight: 15 kg (33 lb)
- Detonation mechanism: Radio proximity fuze
- Engine: Solid-propellant rocket
- Propellant: Solid fuel
- Operational range: 80 km (50 mi)
- Flight altitude: 16 km (52,000 ft)
- Maximum speed: Mach 4
- Guidance system: Mid-course: FOG-INS + Mid-course update via datalink Terminal: ARH
- Launch platform: Surface Ship

The Vertical Launch – Short Range Surface to Air Missile, or VL-SRSAM is a quick reaction surface-to-air missile developed by the Indian Defence Research and Development Organisation (DRDO).

During mid-course flight, the missile uses fibre-optic gyroscope based inertial guidance mechanism while in terminal phase uses active radar homing. With lock on before launch (LOBL) and lock on after launch (LOAL) capability, the missile receives mid-course update via datalink. VL-SRSAM intended to replace older Barak 1 surface to air missile system onboard Indian Navy warships. It will also be used as short range air defence system for Indian Air Force.

== Design ==
VL-SRSAM is based on Astra Mark 1 air-to-air missile with four short-span long-chord cruciform wings that provide aerodynamic stability. It also includes additional jet vane driven thrust vector control to enable quick reaction time on vertical launch and smokeless exhaust. VL-SRSAM conceived for area and point-defence role to save naval platforms. Each Vertical Launch System (VLS) can hold forty missiles in a twin quad-pack canister configuration carrying eight missiles each for hot launch that can be installed in an arrangement of multiple launch systems based on availability of space on the ship. The missile is for neutralizing various aerial threats at medium and close ranges, including fighter aircraft and sea skimming anti-ship missiles. With its 360° interception capability, as an integrated missile and weapon control system (WCS), it can identify and neutralize threats coming from all directions. Even though a short-range air defense missile was the original goal, the VL-SRSAM is a medium-range air defense system. Its attack range of 40 km has been increased to 80 km. The missile is said to be fitted in destroyers, frigates, corvettes and aircraft carriers.

Defence Research and Development Laboratory (DRDL), Research & Development Establishment (Engineers), Research Centre Imarat (RCI) and some private sector industries were involved in the design and development of the missile system as part of Development cum Production Partner programme (DCPP). VL-SRSAM superseded the cancelled Maitri missile project undertaken jointly by MBDA and DRDO based on the work done on MICA and Trishul. The aerodynamic characterization research was conducted at the National Aerospace Laboratories' 1.2m Trisonic Wind Tunnel Facility.

In 2024, DRDO developed an IAF-specific 8×2 truck-mounted variant. It has been developed for defending frontline airbases in conjunction with the Akash system.

== Testing ==
- 22 February 2021: Maiden test firing of VL-SRSAM. DRDO successfully test fired two VL-SRSAM at Integrated Test Range (ITR) in Chandipur, off the coast of Odisha. The launch tested the efficacy of vertical launch system and missile's maximum and minimum range. Both the missile successfully intercepted their target with pin point accuracy.
- 7 December 2021: VL-SRSAM was successfully tested by DRDO from Integrated Test Range, Chandipur. The launch was conducted from a vertical launcher against an electronic target at a very low altitude. The launch was conducted to validate integrated operation of all weapon system components including the vertical launcher unit with controller, canisterised flight vehicle, weapon control system etc.
- 24 June 2022: DRDO announced that India has successfully test-fired the VL-SRSAM from an Indian Naval Ship, off the coast of Chandipur. The launch of the system was conducted against a high-speed aerial target mimicking aircraft, which was successfully engaged.
- 23 August 2022: DRDO and Indian Navy successfully flight tested VL-SRSAM from the ITR, Chandipur off the coast of Odisha on. The flight test was carried out from an Indian Naval Ship against a high-speed unmanned aerial target for demonstration of vertical launch capability. The missiles, equipped with indigenous Radio Frequency (RF) seeker, intercepted the target with high accuracy.
- July 2023: DRDO test fired VL-SRSAM from Integrated Test Range, Chandipur on an unknown date as per a press release.
- 12 September 2024: DRDO and the Indian Navy successfully carried out the VL-SRSAM user associate trial from ITR, Chandipur. The test was conducted against a low-altitude, high-speed aerial target from a land-based vertical launcher. The target was successfully tracked and engaged. The purpose of this test was to verify several improved components, including Seeker and Proximity Fuse.
- 13 September 2024: The Indian Navy and DRDO conducted a successful follow-up VL-SRSAM user associate trial against a high-speed sea-skimming aerial target.
- 26 March 2025: DRDO and the Indian Navy successfully tested VLSRSAM against a high-speed aerial target at low altitude and very close range from a land-based vertical launcher at ITR, Chandipur. The test demonstrated near-boundary-low altitude capability. The missile proved its agility, dependability, and pinpoint precision by destroying the target entirely and accomplishing higher turn rate needed for target engagement at very close range. All of the system components were deployed in combat configuration mode. The missile has functioned as expected thanks to its indigenous RF seeker, multi-function radar, and weapon control system. Several range instruments at ITR recorded flight data, which was used to validate the performance.

== Deployment ==
In order to protect the National Capital Region from missiles and drones, the Ministry of Defence is reportedly in the process of setting up a multi-layered air defense network dubbed Capital Dome, which will incorporate VL-SRSAM and Anant Shastra.

== Operators ==
India

- Rajput-class destroyer
  - INS Rana (D52)
- Brahmaputra-class frigate (planned)
- Kamorta-class corvette (planned)
- Next Generation Missile Vessels (planned)
- Next generation corvette (planned)

== Gallery ==
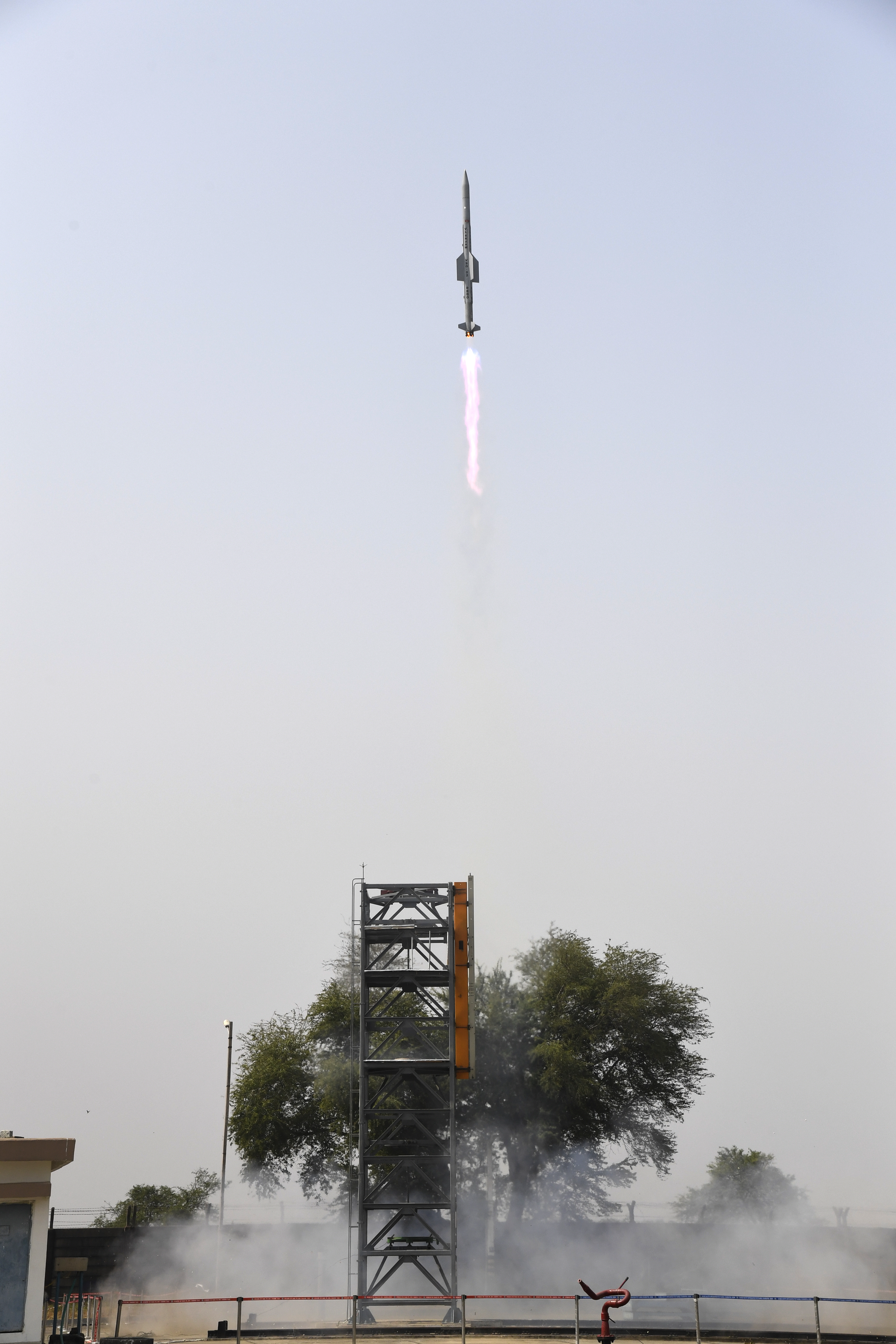
Maiden test (22 February 2021).

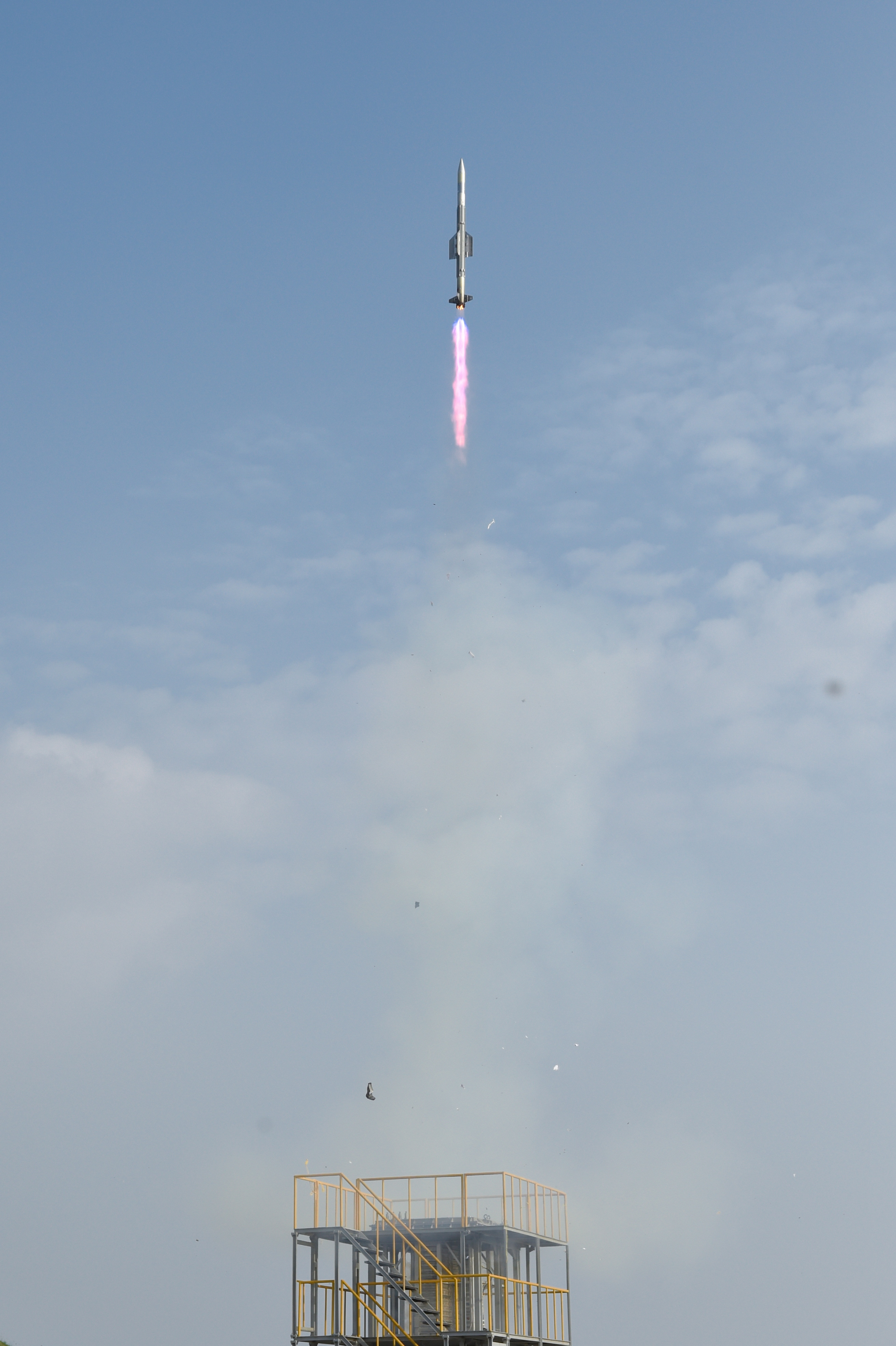
VLS integrated operational validation test (7 December 2021).

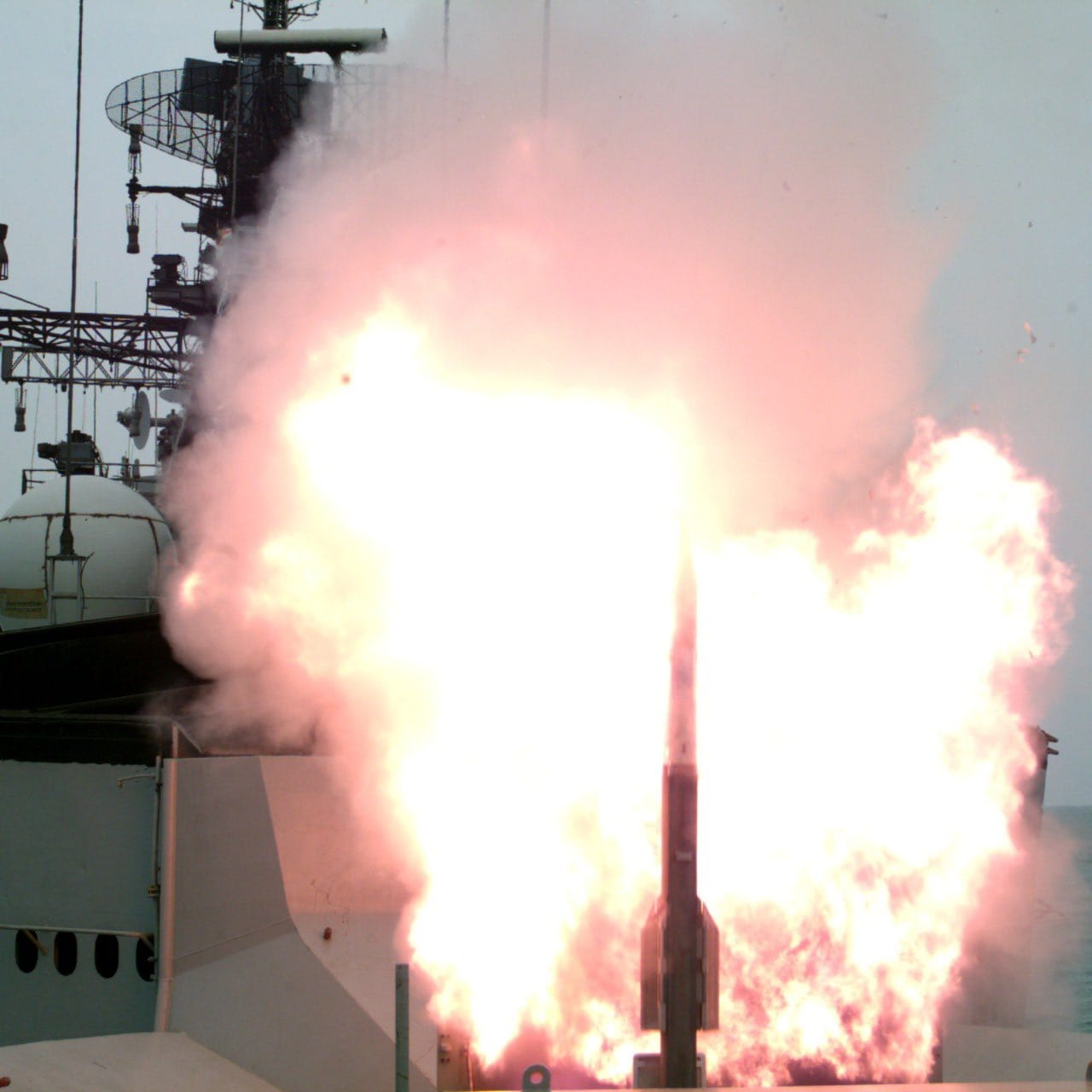
First ship-borne test from an Indian naval ship (24 June 2022).

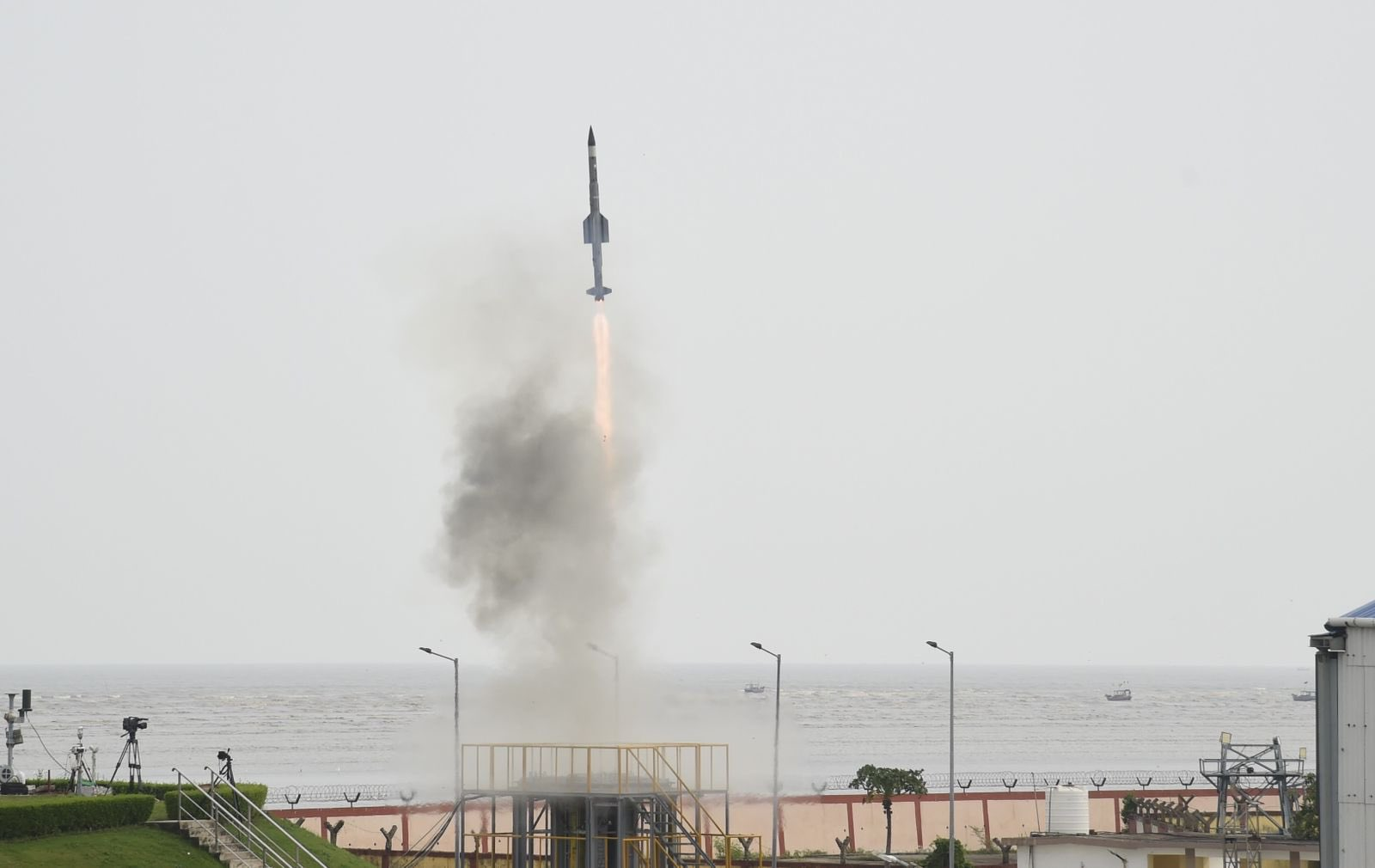
Verification test for improved seeker and proximity fuze (12 September 2024).

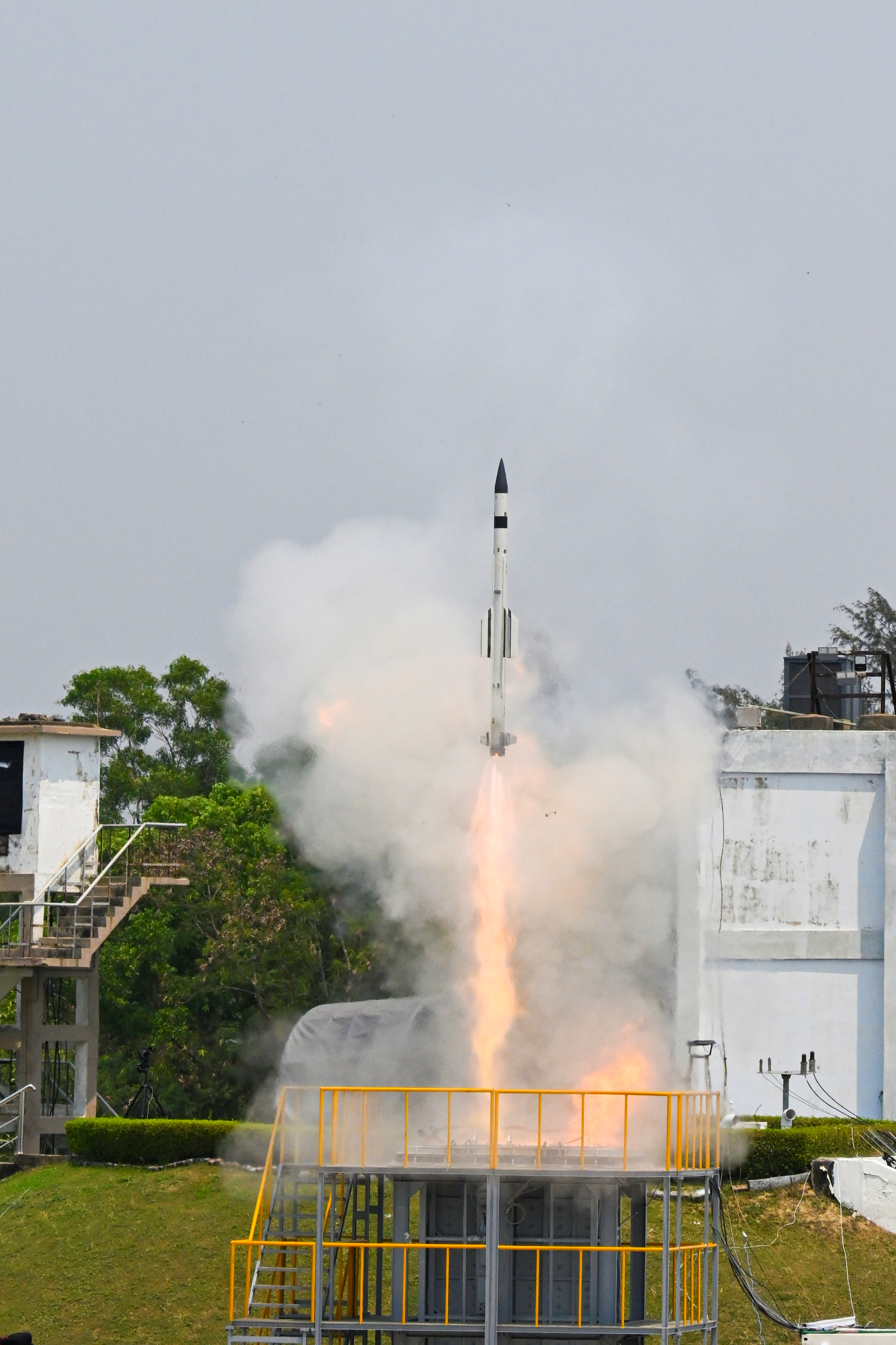
Near-boundary-low altitude capability test (26 March 2025).

== See also ==
- Trishul – (India)
- Maitri – (India)
- Project Kusha – (India)
- Barak 8 – (India, Israel)
- Akash-NG – (India)
- Akash – (India)
- Advanced Air Defence – (India) (AAD)
- Prithvi Air Defence – (India) (PAD)
- Anant Shastra – (India)
