= PL-17 =

Chinese long range air-to-air missile

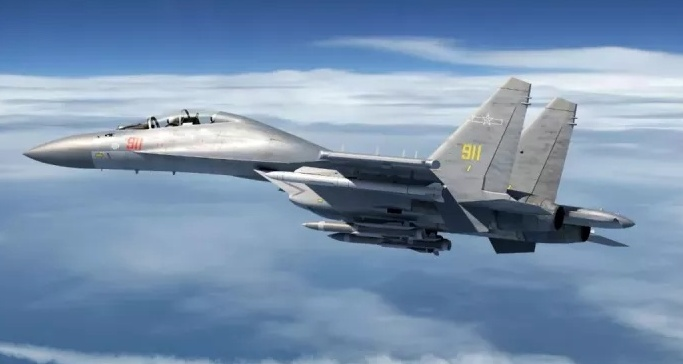
- J-16 armed with PL-17
- Type: Beyond-visual-range air-to-air missile (very-long-range)
- Place of origin: People's Republic of China

Service history
- In service: 2024–present
- Used by: People's Liberation Army Air Force; People's Liberation Army Naval Air Force

Production history
- Manufacturer: Shanghai Academy of Spaceflight Technology

Specifications
- Engine: Dual-pulsed solid-propellant rocket
- Operational range: ~400 km (248.5 mi, 216 nmi)
- Guidance system: Active radar homing/infrared homing /passive radiation homing.
- Launch platform: Chengdu J-20; Shenyang J-16

The PL-17 (NATO reporting name: CH-AA-12 Auger) or PL-20 is an active radar-guided very-long-range air-to-air missile developed by the People's Republic of China for the People's Liberation Army Air Force (PLAAF). The missile has a claimed range of around 400 km (250 mi) and is intended to target high value airborne assets (HVAA) such as tanker and early warning and control (AEW&C) aircraft.

== History and development ==
The missile was first identified on a Shenyang J-16 fighter in 2016, it was fired in November, and can also be deployed on Chinese imported Su-30MKK and Su-35 fighters. It is understood that PL-17 is a separate development from the ramjet-powered PL-21 (PL-XX). PL-17 may have entered PLAAF service in 2024.

== Design ==
PL-17 is much larger than other long-range air-to-air missiles, at 6 m (20 ft) long (whereas PL-15, AIM-120 are measured around 4 m (13 ft) long), which contains more solid fuel. The extended length makes the missile unfit for the internal weapons bay of the Chengdu J-20. During the flight, PL-17 would rely on inertial guidance and satellite navigation to track targets. During the terminal phase, the missile would turn on its multimodal seeker with both active radar and passive sensors. The sensors include, reportedly, a miniature active electronically scanned array (AESA) radar for tracking, passive anti-radiation seeker for locating radar-equipped targets, and a possible optical window featuring an additional infrared seeker as supplement.

The missile body features a low-drag profile, and maneuverability is provided by four small control fins and thrust-vectoring engines. Estimates for its maximum operational range may vary, but the widely reported figure is ~400 km. The missile is powered by a dual pulse rocket motor and flies in lofted launch trajectory to achieve the reported range of 400 km (250 mi) class, according to the Royal United Services Institute. It has a top speed in excess of Mach 4.

== See also ==
- PL-15 – (China)
- PL-21 – (China)
- AIM-174B – (United States)
- R-37M – (Russia)
- Novator KS-172 – (Russia)
- Astra Mark 3 – (India)
