= SFDR =

SFDR may refer to:

- Spurious-free dynamic range, a strength ratio for signals
- Solid Fuel Ducted Ramjet, a missile technology
- Sustainable Finance Disclosure Regulation, a sustainability regulation from the European Union; see also Environmental, social, and corporate governance § History

== See also ==
- San Felipe-Del Rio Consolidated Independent School District (SFDR-CISD), Del Rio, Texas
