= Project 17B-class frigate =

Indian stealth guided-missile frigates

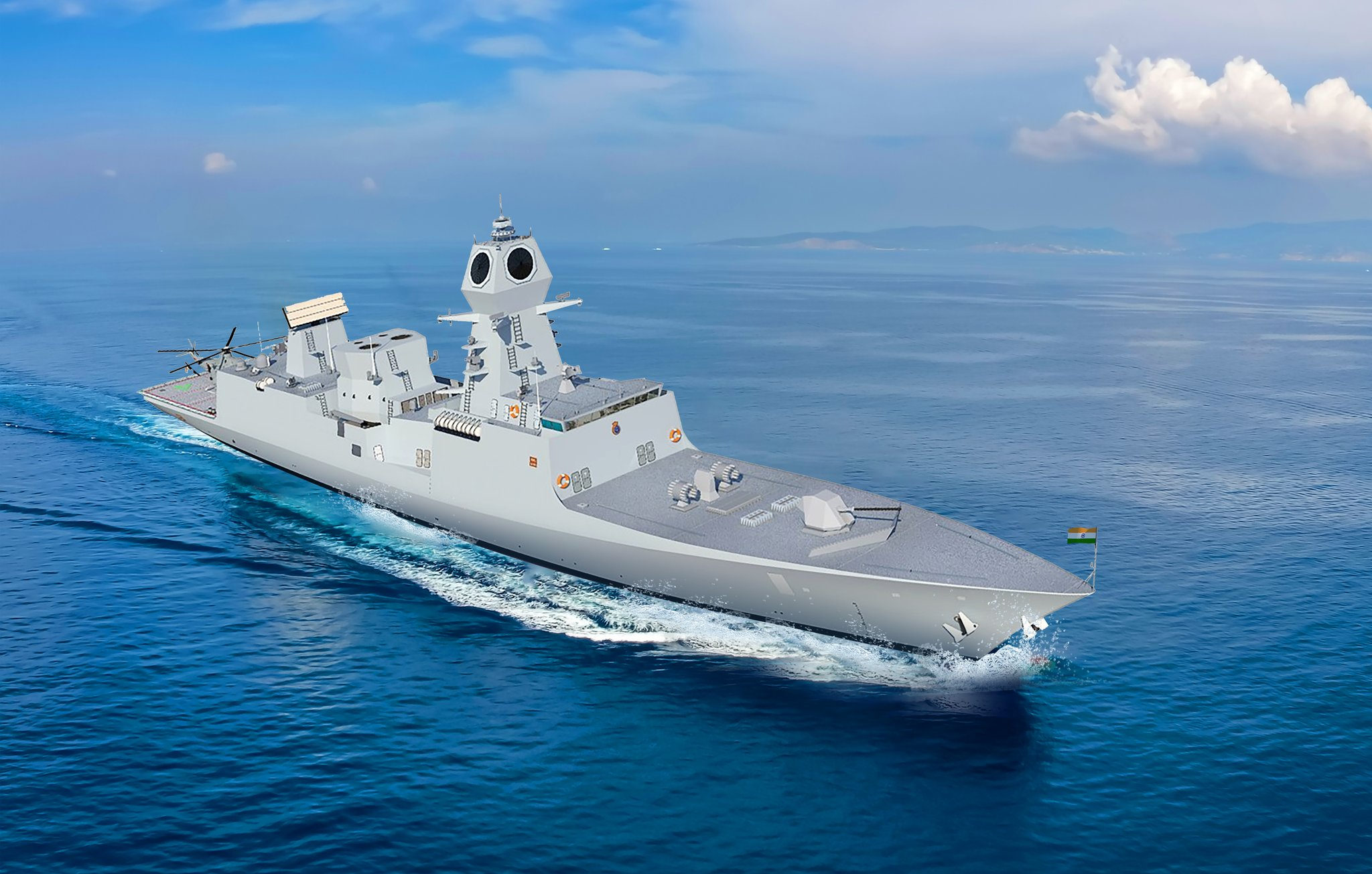
- P-17B will be an improved variant of P-17A design. (Shown is an artist's rendition of P-17A)

Class overview
- Name: Project 17B class
- Builders: Mazagon Dock Shipbuilders; Garden Reach Shipbuilders & Engineers
- Operators: Indian Navy
- Preceded by: Nilgiri class
- Cost: ₹40,000 crore (US$4.2 billion) (Total cost); around ₹6,666.67 crore (US$690 million) per ship
- Planned: 7

General characteristics
- Type: Stealth guided-missile frigate
- Displacement: 6,700–8,000 t (6,600–7,900 long tons)
- Armament: >48 VLS cells which might include; Project Kusha SAMs; Barak 8 SAM; Nirbhay subsonic cruise missile; BrahMos supersonic cruise missile

The Project-17 Bravo frigates (P-17B), also referred to as the Next Generation Frigates (NGF), are a class of planned stealth guided-missile frigates to be built for the Indian Navy (IN). The class will be a follow-on for Nilgiri-class frigates which is under construction. The class is a part of Next Generation series of future frontline surface combatants of the Indian Navy which includes Project 18A destroyer or the Next Generation Destroyers (NGD) and the Next Generation Corvettes (NGC).

== History ==
=== Background ===
In July 2024, reports suggested about a new class of 8 stealth frigates as follow-on of the previous Nilgiri-class frigates which was under construction till them. The ships were to be built by two shipyards with 1:1 order share of 4 ships each. The leading contenders for the deal were Mazagon Dockyard Limited (MDL) and Garden Reach Shipbuilders & Engineers (GRSE). The Ministry of Defence (MoD) was expected to clear the deal soon after the nature of the design of the frigates were under discussion for over a year. This would be the most technically advanced warships to be built in India. The ships will likely feature an indigenous main fire control radar against the EL/M-2248 MF-STAR radars on previous designs as well as other advanced indigenous weapon systems.

=== Development ===
On 3 September 2024, the project, worth ₹70,000 crore (equivalent to ₹750 billion or US$7.7 billion in 2026), was cleared by Defence Acquisition Council (DAC) – the main acquisition panel under the Ministry of Defence (MoD) chaired by Minister of Defence Rajnath Singh for 7-8 next generation ships. The approval for other major projects and acquisitions like Future Ready Combat Vehicles (FRCVs) for main battle tanks of the Indian Army (₹50,000 crore (equivalent to ₹530 billion or US$5.5 billion in 2026)) and 31 MQ-9B drones was granted. Reports also suggested that the ships may weigh up to 8,000 t (7,900 long tons) and have significantly enhanced firepower and strike capabilities when compared to the Nilgiri-class.

As of 8 July 2025, request for proposal (RFP) for the Project 17B frigates is expected soon. As of 18 November, the RFP of Project 17B followed by the same for the MCMV project is expected to be released within 3–4 months.

In July 2026, NDTV reported that the RFP for six frigates under Project 17B will be issued within 18 months and that the construction expected to start within four years of the same. The MDL and GRSE would construct three of the surface combatants each. The programme will advance parallelly with Project 15C and Project 18A destroyer programmes.

The RFP for seven frigates was officially issued on 16 September 2026. Earlier, the Navy used to award projects for destroyers and frigates through nomination route.

== Design ==
=== Armament ===
The ship will be equipped with at least 48 VLS cells which will be compatible for launching surface-to-air missiles as well as surface-to-surface missiles and anti-ship missiles including Barak 8, Project Kusha system, BrahMos and LR-LACM or Indigenous Technology Cruise Missile (ITCM).

== See also ==
=== Frigates of comparable configurations and capabilities ===
- Aquitaine-class frigate (FREMM multipurpose frigate family) – A series of multi-purpose frigates, operated by the French Navy, the Italian Navy, the Royal Moroccan Navy, the Egyptian Navy and currently being built for the United States Navy and the Indonesian Navy.
- Type 26-class frigate – A class of frigates ordered by the Royal Navy, the Royal Canadian Navy and the Royal Australian Navy.
- Mogami-class frigate – A class of multi-mission frigates currently being built for the Japan Maritime Self-Defense Force.
- Admiral Gorshkov-class frigate – A class of guided-missile frigates operated by the Russian Navy.
- Constellation-class frigate – A series of multi-purpose frigates originally planned for the United States Navy. (cancelled)

=== Other references to the Indian Navy ===
- Future ships of the Indian Navy
- List of active Indian Navy ships
