= Maitri (missile) =

Indo-French surface to air missile

The Maitri (Sanskrit: 'Friendship') missile was a proposed next-generation quick-reaction surface-to-air missile (QRSAM) with a claimed ~100% kill probability, planned for development by India's Defence Research and Development Organisation. It would have been part of a short-range (25–30 km) surface-to-air defense system. The proposal was shelved and superseded by the QRSAM and VL-SRSAM missiles for the Indian Army and Indian Navy respectively.

== Introduction ==
The Maitri missile should not be confused with the similar Indian Army Low-Level Quick Reaction Missile system (LLQRM) requirement. The missile will fill the gap created by the Indian government's decision to wind up development of the Trishul point defense missile system. It is believed to be a blend of the French Mica and DRDO Trishul. Maitri will build on the work done by DRDO while developing the Trishul missile, using technology transfer from MBDA to fill the technological gaps that led to the failure of the Trishul project.

== Development ==
On 15 July 2009, The Telegraph reported that the project was scrapped. But later, on June 4, 2010 Indian Express reported that, "After moving ahead with similar projects with Russia and Israel, India is set to finalise a missile co-development project with France to manufacture a new range of Short Range Surface to Air Missiles (SRSAM) for the armed forces." From 2007-2010, MBDA and DRDO finalised the design and performance parameters of the missile to suit the needs of the Indian armed forces. Besides providing the Indian armed forces with a modern air defence missile, the project will also add a new capability with France, which does not have a similar missile in production.

The Maitri missile project involved a technological collaboration between MBDA, India’s Defence Research and Development Organisation (DRDO) and defence public sector unit Bharat Dynamics Limited. Defence Research and Development Laboratory (DRDL), a premier missile laboratory of DRDO, will act as the main design centre in India. The project, with a budget of US$500 million was said to have been signed in May 2007.

On 14 February 2013, India and France concluded negotiations on the Short Range Surface to Air Missile nearly worth $6 billion during the talks between French President Francois Hollande and Prime Minister Manmohan Singh.

On 30 March 2015, it was reported that the project was revived specially by the request of Indian Navy for a point air defence system after stating that Akash missile defence system is not suitable for Indian warships defence. The DRDO with MBDA is planning to develop 9 short-range surface-to-air missile system (SRSAM) with 40 missiles each for Indian Navy. Development of the missile is expected to be completed within three years of the project go-ahead, when initial testing will commence.

As of 2020, The project was expected to be cancelled as DRDO has instead taken up the development of an alternative missile known as VL-SRSAM derived from the Astra Mk1 air-to-air missile for use by the Indian Navy and QRSAM for the Indian Army.

== Design ==
The principal contribution of MBDA will be in providing be the active homing-head, thrust vector control, terminal guidance system and composites for a modified propulsion system for the missile, while the software, command-and-control system, the launchers and system integration work would be carried out by the DRDL.

MBDA has agreed to transfer all sensitive technology such as the seeker and thrust vector control system to India, allowing India to manufacture the Maitri missile locally as well as support them.

== Radar ==
The Electronics & Radar Development Establishment (LRDE), Bangalore, would develop two indigenous radars for the Maitri project. These would be new-generation variants of Central Acquisition Radar (3D-CAR), with the ability to track 150 targets simultaneously at a distance of 200 kilometers. The naval variant would be called the Revati and the air force version would be called Rohini.

== Variants ==
Two variants of the missile were planned:

- A ship-borne point and tactical air defense version for the Navy
- A mobile wheeled and tracked system for use by the Air Force and Army

There are two variants which are as below:

- For navy there are naval missile which is the variants of Maitri.
- For airforce there are Rohini missile which is the variants of Maitri.

== See also ==
- Trishul – (India)
- Anant Shastra – (India)
- VL-SRSAM – (India)
- Akash (missile) – (India)
- Akash-NG – (India)
