= Missile lofting =

Optimized missile trajectory technique

Lofting, sometimes referred to as "trajectory shaping", is a trajectory optimization technique used in some missile systems to extend range and improve target engagement effectiveness, usually in beyond-visual range scenarios.

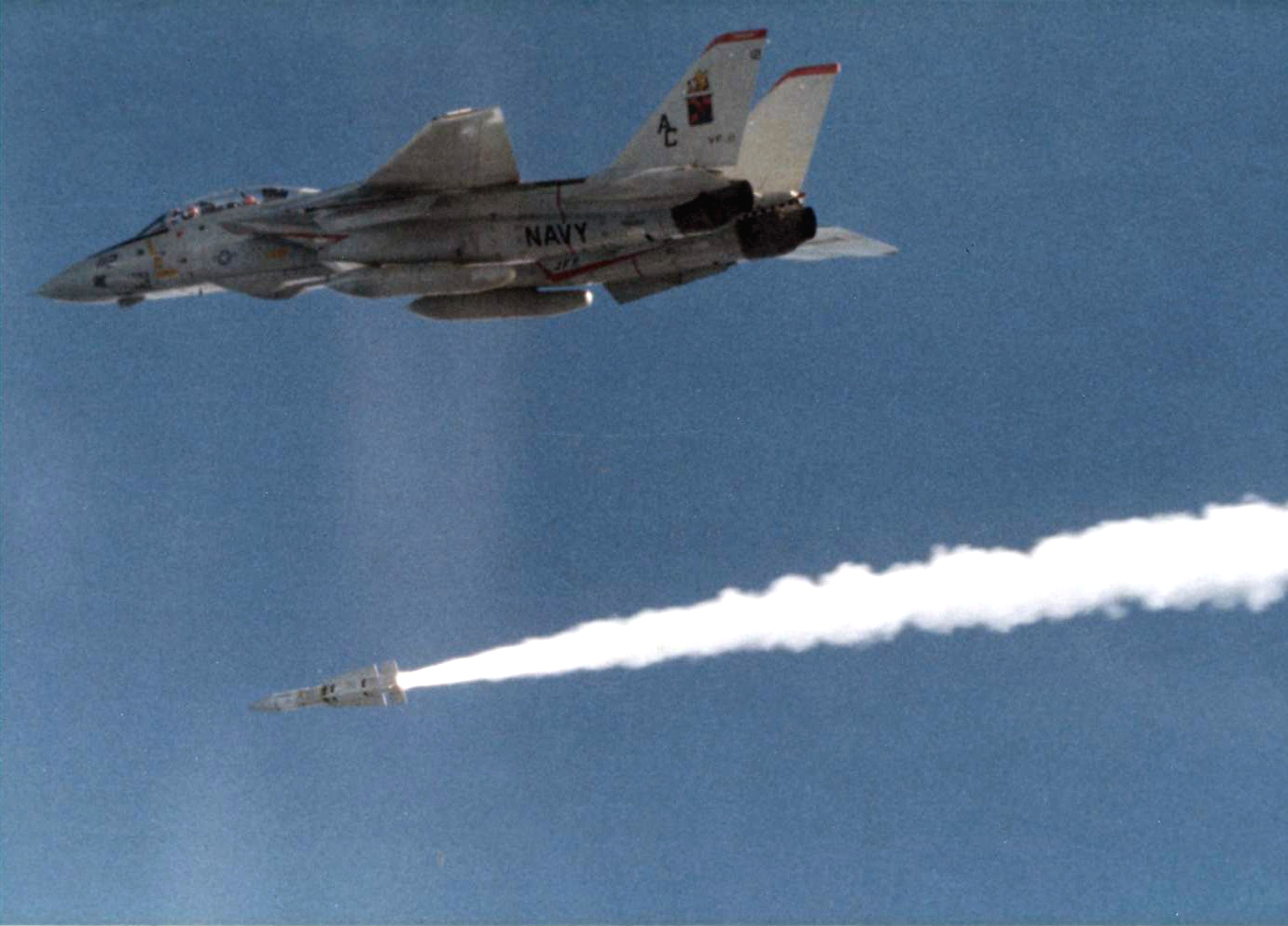
A US-Navy Grumman F-14A Tomcat of VF-11 launches an AIM-54 Phoenix missile, in 1982

== Method ==
Lofting involves a missile ascending to a higher altitude after launch, creating a parabolic arc similar to ballistic missiles, before descending toward its target. This elevated flight path allows the missile to capitalize on reduced air resistance at higher altitudes, increasing both the missile's potential energy and the kinetic energy during terminal guidance, thus enabling greater range and probability of kill.

Peak altitiude of a lofted trajectory can be at altitudes ranging from 20,000–110,000 ft (6–34 km), with most air-to-air missiles peaking at around 80,000–100,000 ft (24–30 km), although the peaks of ballistic missiles' parabolic arcs can range from 50 km (164,042 ft) to 1,500 km (4,921,260 ft).

== Advantages ==
Lofting offers several distinct advantages compared to sea-skimming and direct-intercept trajectories, particularly in beyond-visual-range engagements.

Unlike sea-skimming, which prioritizes low-altitude flight to avoid radar detection but suffers from increased drag and limited range, lofting allows the missile to ascend to higher altitudes where air resistance is lower. This reduced drag enables greater range and energy efficiency, allowing the missile to retain more kinetic energy for terminal guidance and target interception.

Compared to direct-intercept trajectories, lofting also improves engagement flexibility by providing a steeper attack angle, which is particularly effective against maneuvering or high-altitude targets.

== Disadvantages ==
In comparison to sea-skimming trajectories, lofting lacks radar-avoidance characteristics, making it susceptible to detection by its target and potential interceptors.

Lofting is also more mathematically and technologically complex in comparison to direct-interception, and is only viable in long-range engagements.

Additionally, the thinner air which lofting utilizes to reduce drag and increase range carries the downside of impeding the ability for control surfaces to maneuver the missile. This can reduce a missile's ability to adjust for fast-moving or maneuvering targets, however can be circumvented with the use of thrust vectoring - at the downside of added cost and complexity.

== Use in Missiles ==
A number of missiles are known or speculated to utilize lofting techniques, such as:

- AIM-7 Sparrow (AIM-7MH variants and later) - United States
- AIM-120 AMRAAM - United States
- AIM-54 Phoenix - United States
- AIM-260 JATM - United States
- Meteor - France, Sweden, United Kingdom, Germany
- R-77 - Russia
- PL-15 - China
- PL-17 - China
- Astra Mk.2 -India

== See also ==
- Sea-skimming
- Ballistic Missile
- Air-to-Air Missile
