= Next Generation Missile Vessels =

Planned class of warships in the Indian Navy

Class overview
- Name: NGMV class
- Builders: Cochin Shipyard Limited
- Operators: Indian Navy
- Preceded by: ASW SWC class by antecedence; Veer-class corvette by role
- Succeeded by: Next generation corvette (NGC)
- Cost: ₹9,805 crore (equivalent to ₹110 billion or US$1.1 billion in 2026) for six ships; ₹1,634 crore (equivalent to ₹19 billion or US$200 million in 2026) per unit
- Built: 2024 – present
- Planned: 6
- Building: 2

General characteristics (NGMV)
- Type: ASuW
- Displacement: 1,437 tonnes
- Length: 89 m (292 ft 0 in)
- Beam: 12.0 m (39 ft 4 in)
- Draught: < 3.4 m (11 ft 2 in)
- Propulsion: CODAG 1 × General Electric LM2500 2 × Pielstick 12PA 6 STC6 Diesel engines 3 × Kongsberg Kamewa waterjets
- Speed: 35 knots (65 km/h; 40 mph)
- Range: Economy: 2,800 nmi (5,200 km; 3,200 mi) at 25 kn (46 km/h; 29 mph); Maximum: 1,000 nmi (1,900 km; 1,200 mi) at 35 kn (65 km/h; 40 mph)
- Endurance: >10 days at economical speed
- Boats & landing craft carried: 1 × RIB
- Complement: 80 sailors and 13 officers
- Sensors & processing systems: 1 x Surface surveillance radar; 1 x Air surveillance radar; 1 x Lynx-U2 fire control radar; 1 x IRST
- Electronic warfare & decoys: Kavach decoy system
- Armament: Guns: 1 x OTO Melara 76 mm Super Rapid Gun Mount (SRGM); 2 x AK-630M CIWS; 2 x OFT 12.7 mm M2 Stabilized Remote Controlled Gun; Anti-ship missiles: 8 × BrahMos; Anti-aircraft warfare: 24 × VL-SRSAM; 8 × VSHORAD (Anti drone system); 2 × Loitering Munition

Next Generation Missile Vessels (NGMVs) are a planned class of anti-surface warfare corvettes for the Indian Navy. Under this programme the Indian Navy intends to acquire six advanced missile vessels. Ships in this class will be armed with anti-ship missile or land-attack missile like BrahMos. Ships under this class will feature advanced stealth features like a low radar cross section (RCS), infrared, acoustic and magnetic signatures.

== Development ==
On 2 January 2015 the Ministry of Defence (MOD) issued a request for information (RFI) under Buy Indian and Make Indian category for six new missile corvettes by initiating the Next Generation Missile Vessels (NGMVs) programme. Vendors who chose to respond to the RFI must meet "minimum qualifying criteria" mainly, shipyard should have already built "vessel(s) of similar specifications". A request for proposal (RfP) worth $2.2 billion was filed by the Government of India to various Indian shipyards seeking for various warships including six missile boats.

On 23 February 2021, Cochin Shipyard (CSL) won the bid to construct 6 Next Generation Missile Vessels (NGMV) for a cost ₹10,000 crores.

On 11 January 2023, the Defence Acquisition Council (DAC) approved the Acceptance of Necessity (AoN) for procurement of BrahMos launchers and fire control systems for Next Generation Missile Vessels and Shivalik-class frigates.

On 30 March 2023, MoD signed the contract for acquisition of six NGMV with CSL at a cost of ₹9,805 crore (equivalent to ₹110 billion or US$1.1 billion in 2026). The delivery of ships is scheduled to commence from March 2027. According to MoD, the construction of these ships will generate an employment of 45 lakh man-days over a period of nine years.

On 15 September 2023, Bharat Electronics announced that they have received an order worth ₹2,118.57 crore (equivalent to ₹23 billion or US$240 million in 2026) from CSL to supply "state-of-the-art technology" including sensors and weapons equipment for the NGMV project.

On 14 February 2024, CSL signed a ₹274.76 crore (equivalent to ₹293 crore or US$30 million in 2026) contract with Advanced Weapons and Equipment India Limited to acquire 12 AK-630 naval guns. The guns will be manufactured by the Gun & Shell Factory, Cossipore in Kolkata.

On 29 March 2024, CSL signed another deal with Hindustan Aeronautics Limited worth ₹1,173 crore (equivalent to ₹12 billion or US$130 million in 2026) for in-house manufacturing six units of LM2500 for NGMV, which are scheduled to be delivered between 2026 and 2029.

On 8 April 2026, Kongsberg Defence & Aerospace received a contract to supply 18 sets of large Kamewa waterjets from the CSL. This was the former's single largest waterjet contract.

=== Construction timeline ===
- 16 December 2024 — Steel cutting ceremony for first ship.
- 17 September 2026 — Steel cutting ceremony for second ship in presence of Rear Admiral Kapil Mehta, NM, ACWP&A, Indian Navy.
- 18 September 2026 — Keel laid for first ship in presence of Vice Admiral Sanjay Sadhu, CWP&A, Indian Navy.
- 2027 — First vessel scheduled for induction.

== Design and description ==
The RFI suggests that ships will be about 2,200-2,800 tonnes each. The new ships will have a complement of 11 officers, 2 trainee officers and 80 sailors. The range will be at least 2,800 nautical miles (5,200 km; 3,200 mi) (1,000 nmi; 1,900 km; 1,200 mi at full speed) and speed performance will be 25 knots (46 km/h; 29 mph) (max speed of 35 knots; 65 km/h; 40 mph), being propelled by three Kongsberg Kamewa waterjets each. The ships will carry eight surface-to-surface missiles, a full-fledged surface-to-air missile (SAM) system with point defence capabilities and a 15 km (9.3 mi) range MR gun system. The ships will also have radar and electro-optically (EO) guided close-in weapon systems (CIWS) with 360-degree anti-missile defence.

The ships are being equipped with eight slant launchers for BrahMos and 24 VLS cells for VL-SRSAM along with an advanced sensor suite.

== Ships of the class ==
Name	Pennant	Yard No	Builder	Keel laid	Launched	Commissioned	Home-port	Status
Indian Navy
TBD		531	Cochin Shipyard	18 September 2026				Under Construction
TBD		532	Cochin Shipyard					Under Construction
TBD		533	Cochin Shipyard					Ordered
TBD		534	Cochin Shipyard					Ordered
TBD		535	Cochin Shipyard					Ordered
TBD		536	Cochin Shipyard					Ordered

== See also ==
- Project 75I-class submarine
- Kamorta-class corvette
- Indian Navy Multi-Role Support Vessel programme
- Future of the Indian Navy
