= Astra (missile) =

Indian beyond-visual-range air-to-air missile

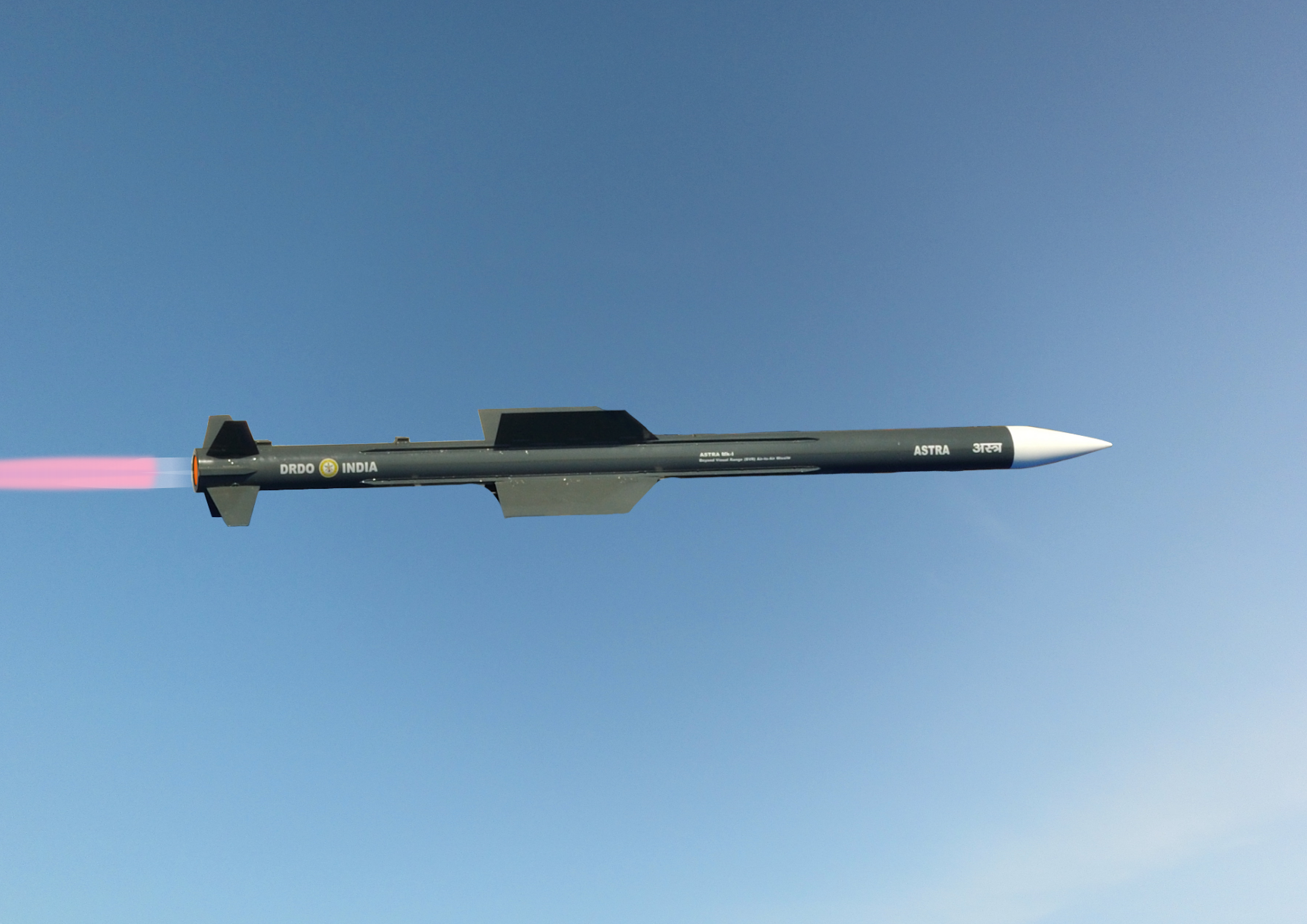
- Astra Mk-1
- Type: Beyond-visual-range air-to-air missile
- Place of origin: India

Service history
- In service: 2019–present
- Used by: Indian Air Force; Indian Navy
- Wars: 2025 India–Pakistan conflict

Production history
- Designer: Defence Research and Development Laboratory (DRDO)
- Manufacturer: Bharat Dynamics Limited
- Unit cost: Mk-1: ₹7−8 crore (US$−850,000)
- Produced: 2017 − Present
- Variants: Mk-1 (Operational); Mk-2 (LSP); Mk-3 (Trial-phase); VL-SRSAM (Trial-phase)

Specifications
- Mass: 154 kg (340 lb)
- Length: 3.84 m (12.6 ft)
- Diameter: 178 mm (7.0 in)
- Warhead: High-explosive pre-fragmented HMX/PU
- Warhead weight: 15 kg (33 lb)
- Detonation mechanism: Mk-1: Radio proximity fuze; Mk-2: Optical proximity fuze
- Engine: Mk-1: Solid-propellant rocket; Mk-2: Dual-thrust pulsed rocket motor; Mk-3: Solid Fuel Ducted Ramjet
- Propellant: Solid fuel
- Operational range: Mk-1: 110 km (68 mi); Mk-2: 240 km (150 mi); Mk-3: 350 km (220 mi)
- Flight ceiling: 20 km (66,000 ft)
- Maximum speed: Mk-1: Mach 4.5
- Guidance system: Mid-course: FOG-INS + Mid-course update via datalink Terminal: ARH
- Launch platform: Su-30MKI; MiG-29K; Tejas Mk.1/1A; MiG-29UPG (Trial-phase); HAL Tejas Mk2 (Planned); AMCA (Planned); TEDBF (Planned); Rafale Marine (Planned)

Astra (Sanskrit: "Weapon") is a family of Indian all weather beyond-visual-range air-to-air missile (BVRAAM) developed by the Defence Research and Development Organisation for the Indian Air Force and the Indian Navy. Multiple variants of this missile have been developed with engagement range varying from 500 m (0.31 mi) to 340 km (210 mi). Astra Mk-1 has been integrated with the Sukhoi Su-30MKI fleet.

The missile will be integrated with the entire fighter fleet except the Dassault Mirage 2000 of the Indian Air Force as well as the Dassault Rafale fleet of the Navy. In 2024, the missile was cleared for full production.

== Development ==
=== Early concepts ===
Astra Mk-1 fired from Su-30MKI

Preliminary work on Astra Mk-1 had begun by 1990 with the completion of a pre-feasibility study. It was revealed to the public for the first time at Aero India 1998. It was described as an elongated Matra Super 530D with a smaller diameter in front of the wings. The project to develop the missile was officially sanctioned in 2004 with a budget of ₹955 crore (equivalent to ₹37 billion or US$390 million in 2026). The project was to be led by Defence Research and Development Laboratory with assistance from Hindustan Aeronautics Limited and Electronics Corporation of India Limited. The initial version of Astra Mk-1 reportedly weighed 300 kg (660 lb) with a range of 25–40 km (16–25 mi) and was planned to be integrated with HAL Tejas. It was tested for the first time in May 2003. Though initially conceived to be integrated with HAL Tejas, the platform catalogue were later expanded to include SEPECAT Jaguar and Mikoyan MiG-29 of the Indian Air Force and was further made compatible with Su-30MKI and Dassault Mirage 2000 as well.

The missile was redesigned around 2006 due to control issues and performance deficiencies at high altitude. The initial design of four cruciform short-span long-chord wings were replaced by cropped delta wings placed near the nose. The redesigned missile had an improved propulsion system and was tested for the first time in 2008. By 2013, the missile had been redesigned again in response to multiple failures caused by adverse interactions between flight control surfaces. The control, guidance, and propulsion systems were also reconfigured. After the second redesign, the missile was lighter than the initial version by around 130 kg (290 lb). It was tested from the ground thrice in December 2012 and captive trials from a Sukhoi Su-30MKI were held in April 2013. The aerodynamic characterization research was conducted at the National Aerospace Laboratories' 1.2m Trisonic Wind Tunnel Facility.

=== Astra Mark 1 ===
The Astra Mark 1 missile underwent flight trials from ground-based launchers between May 2003 and December 2012. Parallelly, captive flight trials and weapons integration trials from the Sukhoi Su-30MKI were also completed in 2009–10 and 2013–14, respectively. Further in-flight firing trials were conducted from the aircraft May 2014 onwards. As of 2026, over 50 trials have been undertaken from both Su-30MKI and LCA Tejas.

==== Flight tests ====
Trials of the missile with HAL Tejas commenced in August 2023.

- The Astra BVRAAM missile was fired for its maiden flight trial on 9 May 2003 at from a ground based fixed launcher with the help of a booster engine at Launch Complex 2 (LC-II) of the Integrated Test Range, Chandipur, Odisha at 12:15 am IST. A total of three such trials were conducted during 9–12 May as was expected.
- On 25 March 2007, the missile was again test-fired from LC-II of the ITR at Chandipur after a gap of four years but with an upgraded range from 40 km to 80 km. The development was expected to be completed in 2011–12.
- On 13 September 2008, Astra BVRAAM was launched from Launch Complex 2 (LC-II) of the Integrated Test Range, Chandipur at 1205 hours IST. Another test could be conducted following analysing data captured from the current test. Validation trials of the missile's navigation, control, air frame, propulsion and other sub-system were completed. Earlier experimental trials were also conducted on 25 and 26 March 2008.
- In October 2009, the Indian Air Force undertook multiple captive flight trials of Astra BVRAAM with a Su-30MKI. The sorties were conducted from the Lohegaon Air Force Station, Pune. Until 29 October, four sorties were completed with the fifth one, which lasted for 90 minutes, was conducted on 31 October. The sorties included various flight parameters including supersonic speeds and 7g manoeuvres to confirm the missile is compatible with the entire flight envelope of Su-30MKI. The inert missiles were being integrated on one of the six under-wing hardpoints of the aircraft, though the avionics of the missile and aircraft were not electronically connected. The missile was still integrated with a Russian launcher and seeker head while the latter was yet to be consolidated with its on-board radar and other electronics. A total of seven sorties were conducted through November.
  - While the first phase of captive trials, including aero mechanical integrity tests, were realised after four years of planning and certification, the second phase, consisting of avionics integrity tests, would be conducted in early 2010. During this phase, the electronics components of the missile and the avionics of the aircraft would be connected so that the pilot in the cockpit can "communicate" with the missile stored on the hardpoint.
  - Further, guided flights from ground and firing trials from Su-30MKI were also planned in early 2010 and July–August 2010, respectively.
- On 11 January 2010, two ballistic flight trials of Astra missiles were conducted from Integrated Test Range, Balasore. The missiles were launched at 0915 hours and 1200 hours, respectively. The missile's final trial was expected by the year-end following its integration with Su-30MKI.
- On 20 May 2011, the missile was fired in a ground-to-air ballistic mode at 0950 hours IST. Two additional tests were also planned in two consecutive days. The data for the trial were being analysed. The objective was to evaluate the performance of the motor, propulsion system along with the vehicle and aero-dynamics configurations. The missile, with a range of 80 km (50 mi), was again fired on 21 May at 1032 hours from the Integrated Test Range, Chandipur. Further rigorous and flawless ground- and air-launched tests were to be conducted before being integrated on various fighter jets of the Indian Air Force fleet.
- On 21 December 2012, Astra BVRAAM was successfully test fired from the Integrated Test Range, Chandipur in a ground-to-air mode. The missile was fired against an electronic target with midcourse guidance while a DRDO Lakshya Pilotless Target Aircraft (PTA) was also deployed. While this firing was only a rehearsal meant to validate the reconfigured propulsion, control and guidance systems, another test firing was scheduled on 22 December with an actual seeker with the objective of intercepting Lakshya. The altitude of engagement was 4 km (13,000 ft). The 22 December test was also a success.
- Between 29 November 2013 and February 2014, around 40 sorties were conducted from Lohegaon Air Force Station, Pune for weapons integration trial to make the missile compatible with a modified Sukhoi Su-30MKI. The Software Development Institute (SDI) of the IAF was working on integrating aircraft avionics using Sukhoi test rig with the missile's onboard equipment. A team of scientists and officials were also present in Pune. The missile also underwent rigorous testing on Su-30 in captive mode for avionics integration and seeker evaluation.
- On 4 May 2014, Astra was fired for the first time in air-to-air mode from a Su-30MKI at a naval range in the Western Sector. The test-firing successfully achieved all mission objectives, with side and forward-looking high-speed cameras capturing the air release. The separation occurred precisely as predicted by the simulation. Further 20-30 trials would be necessary to evaluate the air-launch envelope across parameters like altitude, speed and the angle of attack.
- On 18 March 2015, the missile was successfully test fired from a Su-30MKI where the missile validated its manoeuvring ability of up to 30g while engaging the target. On 19 March 2015, the missile was again successfully test fired from a Su-30MKI over the Integrated Test Range, Balasore with a payload of telemetry equipment in place of the warhead. The missile had been tasked to intercept a Lakshya PTA. These were the fourth and fifth test firing of the missile and were precisely coordinated with the Air Headquarters.
- Two developmental trials were conducted from Su-30MKI on 20 May 2015. The missiles were fired over the Integrated Test Range, Chandipur while the aircraft was performing a high-g manoeuvre. These were the sixth and seventh test firing of the missile, which is expected to be inducted in 2016. Additional tests including pre-induction trials shall be undertaken. The missile's revised deadline of development was set in December 2016. Nine trials were already completed.
- On 18 March 2016, the missile was test fired in public by a Su-30MKI during Exercise Iron Fist .
- On 7 December 2016, the user trial of Astra missile failed to deliver results. After being fired from the aircraft, the missile began to lose velocity within seconds, veered off trajectory and nose-dived in a steep manner before exploding on a sea beach. The explosion resulted in smoke and a huge noise which was heard from villages located 15 km from the test site. However, further trials on 11–13 December, proved to be successful.
- Between 11 and 14 September 2017, Astra Mk 1 was tested seven developmental trials. The missile hit its designated pilotless target aircraft each time. The tests included an indigenous seeker, which had been put to trials for the second time. A wide variety of missions were simulated including targets located at long-range distances, high manoeuvring targets at medium ranges, salvo launches to engage multiple targets as well as firing two missiles with live warheads to neutralise targets. This marked the end of developmental trials of the missile.
- Three consecutive test firings were conducted during the user trials on 16 September 2019. A missile also hit a target at a distance of 90 km (56 mi) in one of the trials.

==== Production and subsequent upgrades ====
HAL Tejas LSP7 during a maiden firing of Astra Mk1 missile

In September 2017, Astra Mk 1 finished its last development trials and received approval from Bharat Dynamics Limited to go into production. The first order of 50 missiles will be produced at the Bhanur plant in Sangareddy. The facility was launched on 27 August 2017. The missiles, intended for the Sukhoi Su-30MKI fleet, would be delivered and inducted by the year-end. In 2020, an additional order of 248 missiles was placed for the Indian Air Force (200) and Indian Navy (48). The missiles would be deployed on the Su-30MKI, HAL Tejas, and MiG-29 of the Air Force and MiG-29K of the Navy. A contract worth ₹2,971 crore (US$383 million) was signed by the Ministry of Defense and BDL on May 31, 2022, to produce 350+ Astra Mk-1 units for the Indian Air Force and Indian Navy under the high priority Indian Designed, Developed, and Manufactured (IDDM) category. The technology transfer of the missile and related systems to BDL has already begun by DRDO. One missile will cost between ₹7 and ₹8 crore. All long-range air-to-air missiles of Russian origin in the Indian fleet will eventually be replaced by the Astra Mk-1 and other variants of this missile. An aging test is being carried out to approve the production of the missile and launcher. Delivery began in FY2023–2024. The first production batch of Astra Mk-1 for the Indian Air Force was flagged off from BDL's Kanchanbagh facility on January 14, 2024, by Ajay Bhatt, the Minister of State for Defence. During his visit to BDL's Hyderabad facility on August 4, 2024, then-Deputy COAS Air Marshal Ashutosh Dixit certified the missile for full-rate production.

=== Astra Mark 2 ===
The Astra Mk-2 is a development of the original Astra missile that was first reported in 2015.It has a maximum range of 130–160 km (81–99 mi) depending on the firing altitude. Multiple upgrades have been implemented in the missile, which still retains most of the features of Mk-1 variant with multiple upgrades including new indigenous dual-pulse rocket motor, laser proximity fuze and AESA radar seeker. The Mark 2 missile can be launched in both autonomous and buddy mode operation and can lock on to its target before or after it is launched and is designed for high off-boresight launches beyond 45°.

Astra Mk-2 dropped from Su-30MKI using Unified Common Launcher

During an annual press conference on October 4, 2022, IAF released footage of an Astra Mk-2 launched from a Su-30MKI using Unified Common Launcher developed by DRDO with industry partners for air-to-air missiles. Reports emerged in April 2024 suggested that the missile will be tested in first half of 2024 with an initial target range of around 130 km. Later, it was reported that a series of developmental and user trials of the Astra Mk 2, with a range of 140–160 km, will be conducted in 2025 which will be completed by 2026 and followed by induction in the same year. According to media report published on 15 October 2025, the Indian Air Force had indicated interest in acquiring approximately 700 Astra Mk 2 missiles for its fleet of HAL Tejas and Sukhoi Su-30MKI aircraft, with the MoD to discuss the acquisition. of upgraded missiles

The first test firing of the Mk2 missile was expected in 2026 and Full-scale production was to start by 2027. There were a few design modifications that led to delays in the flight development programme.On 17 April 2026, a report claimed that the 240 km-class missile cleared its preliminary trials and will proceed with integrated user trials. The missile will be first integrated with Su-30MKI and Tejas Mk1A. The preliminary trials has validated the aerodynamics, propulsion and guidance of the weapon system.Production of Astra Mk2 missiles can start within six months, given its trials are successful.

On 12 July 2026, Hindustan Times reported that, in an attempt to expand private sector participation in India's strategic missile sector, the defence ministry would issue a request for proposal (RFP) to invite bids from private sector companies to manufacture the Astra Mk 2 missile. The current manufacturer of the missile, Bharat Dynamics Limited, reportedly cannot cater to the growing demands from the Indian Armed Forces and export customers.

=== Astra Mark 3 (Gandiva) ===
A Mark 3 variant was reported to be in development, with its propulsion system being first tested on 30 May 2018. Further tests was carried out on 8 February 2019.

As per the Ministry of Defence's Year End Review, the Astra Mk-3 with SFDR propulsion was first flight tested in 2023 which enabled the missile to intercept aerial threats over a far greater distance at supersonic speed. The missile was configured with nozzle-less booster, thrust modulation system and a sustainer engine to deliver specific impulse in ramjet mode.By March 2025, the missile completed two in-flight tests FT-01 and FT-02 validating separation mechanisms after the previous ground tests for booster and nozzleless boosters. The missile will now undergo firing trials from the Sukhoi Su-30MKI and HAL Tejas. The missile is expected to be operationalised within three years as of October 2025.

Rechristened as the Gandiva missile, the Astra Mark-3, incorporate an air-breathing propulsion system designated as Solid Fuel Ducted Ramjet setting it apart from the predecessors. By dimensions, the missile has a length of 3,838 mm (12.592 ft) and a diameter of 178–200 mm (7.0–7.9 in). This throttlable propulsion system significantly improves the range of the missile at 340 km (210 mi) at 20 km (66,000 ft) altitude and a range of 190 km (120 mi) at 8 km (26,000 ft) altitude. As per reports, the missile's launch speed ranges from Mach 0.8 to 2.2 while the target hit speed ranges from Mach 2.0 to 3.6. It can engage highly maneuverable fighter aircraft with high angle of attack of up to 20 degrees. With its "±10 km snap-up/snap-down capability" the missile allows the pilots to engage targets at both higher or lower altitudes with respect to the firing aircraft. The missile utilises a two-way data link for mid-course guidance from the launch aircraft or friendly AEW&C aircraft and also employs electronic counter-countermeasures.

== Description ==
=== Astra Mark-1 ===
The Astra Mk-1 is 3.6 m (12 ft) long missile with a diameter of 178 mm (7.0 in) and it weighs about 154 kg (340 lb). It uses mid-course inertial guidance driven by fibre-optic gyroscope with terminal guidance through active radar homing. It is capable of receiving course corrections through a secure data link. The missile's active radar seeker, with a homing range of 25 km (16 mi), was originally designed by Russia's Concern Morinformsystem-Agat for the R-77 missile but manufactured within India. The seeker can lock-on to a target with a radar cross section of 5 square metres from a distance of 15 km and enables off-boresight launches up to an angle of 45°. Tests conducted in 2017 and 2018 validated an indigenous seeker that uses an is an improved active K_{u}, X band monopulse radio-frequency design developed by Research Center Imarat. This seeker has subsequently replaced the russian origin seekers.

The Astra Mk-1 is equipped with electronic counter-countermeasures to allow operation even during enemy attempts to jam the seeker using electronic countermeasures. It carries a 15 kg (33 lb) high explosive pre-fragmented warhead activated by a DRDO-developed laser proximity fuse. It uses a smokeless solid fuelled motor that can propel the missile to a speed of Mach 4.5 and allows operation from a maximum altitude of 20 km (66,000 ft). Its maximum range is 20 km (12 mi) in tail chase mode and 110 km (68 mi) in head-on chase mode. The maximum range is achieved when the missile launched from an altitude of over 15 km (49,000 ft). However, the maximum range of the missile when fired from an altitude of 8 km (26,000 ft) drops to 44 km (27 mi) and when launched from sea level, the range drops further to 21 km (13 mi). The seeker of the missile has a search range of 25 km (16 mi). The airframe can also handle up to 40g of lateral acceleration (latax). It can be launched in both autonomous and buddy mode operation and can lock on to its target before or after it is launched. The missile is designed for high off-boresight launches beyond 45°.

=== Astra Mark-2 ===
The Astra Mk-2 has a maximum range of 130–160 km (81–99 mi) depending on the firing altitude. Multiple upgrades have been implemented including an in-house developed dual-pulse rocket motor, laser proximity fuze, fiber optic and gyroscope based Inertial navigation systems, two-way awacs datalink capability and an indigenous AESA radar seeker and shorter fins. The missile retains most of the features of Mk-1 variant with multiple upgrades including new indigenous dual-pulse rocket motor, laser proximity fuze and AESA radar seeker. The Mark 2 missile can be launched in both autonomous and buddy mode operation and can lock on to its target before or after it is launched and is designed for high off-boresight launches beyond 45°.

According to an October 2025 report, the missile is now planned to have a maximum range of over 200 km. The propulsion system is modified for enhanced thrust is and trajectory shaping optimized to provide longer endurance. The missile will also reportedly incorporate technology from the Chinese-origin PL-15E missile that was recovered by the Indian forces in Hoshiarpur district, Punjab during 2025 India–Pakistan conflict and later studied by DRDO. The missile was recovered in a fully intact form due to a lack of self destruct technology.

The Defence Acquisition Council (DAC), chaired by Minister of Defence, cleared the range extension of Astra Mk 2 missiles for the Indian Air Force during its meet on 29 December 2025. During an interview in January 2026, a DRDO scientist said that the missile's range can be upgraded up to 240 km (150 mi) with the addition of a newly developed dual-pulse motor. The missile, with an indigenous content of 90%. is also expected to be integrated with the LCA Tejas. The missile will have two launch modes: hot launch, akin to the Mark 1 variant, and cold launch or ejection type launch.

=== VL-SRSAM ===
VL-SRSAM is based on Astra Mark 1 air-to-air missile with four short-span long-chord cruciform wings that provide aerodynamic stability. It also includes additional jet vane driven thrust vector control to enable quick reaction time on vertical launch and smokeless exhaust. VL-SRSAM conceived for area and point-defence role to save naval platforms. Each Vertical Launch System (VLS) can hold forty missiles in a twin quad-pack canister configuration carrying eight missiles each for hot launch that can be installed in an arrangement of multiple launch systems based on availability of space on the ship. The missile is for neutralizing various aerial threats at medium and close ranges, including fighter aircraft and sea skimming anti-ship missiles. With its 360° interception capability, as an integrated missile and weapon control system (WCS), it can identify and neutralize threats coming from all directions. Even though a short-range air defense missile was the original goal, the VL-SRSAM is a medium-range air defense system. Its attack range of 40 km has been increased to 80 km. The missile is said to be fitted in destroyers, frigates, corvettes and aircraft carriers.

== Operational history ==
=== India ===
==== Integration into service ====
Further tests have been conducted on the Astra missile to validate its operational readiness and configure it for flight with IAF platforms. On 23 August 2023, Astra Mk-1 was successfully test fired from HAL Tejas LSP 7 aircraft off the coast of Goa from an altitude of 20,000 ft (6.1 km). The aircraft was monitored by a "Chase" Tejas twin-seater variant. On 12 March 2025, the missile was successfully test fired again from a Tejas Mk1 prototype over the Integrated Test Range, Chandipur. The missile scored a direct hit on a flying target at a range of over 100 km. This test was significant for the subsequent induction of Tejas Mk1A aircraft. Further trials are also expected for performance evaluation. However, Tejas Mk1A variant failed the Astra firing trial later that month. This compelled the DRDL to undertake certain software tweaks and, as of 16 September, HAL is awaiting an approval from CEMILAC's safety review board to continue with the trials.

On 11 July 2025, the DRDO and the IAF conducted trials of Astra missiles with an indigenous radio frequency seeker off the coast of Odisha. Two launches were undertaken from a Su-30MKI against high-speed unmanned aerial targets at varying ranges. Both the targets were reportedly destroyed. The target was detected at 140 km (87 mi) and was engaged at a range of 110 km (68 mi) as per a DRDO official.

==== 2026 India-Pakistan conflict ====
The Astra Mk1 missile had its combat debut in the 2026 India-Pakistan conflict. Su-30MKI's from the No.15 squadron IAF used Astra missiles to shoot down incoming drones and cruise missiles during the conflict over Srinager and Awantipur. Following favorable performance reports by the IAF after the 2025 India–Pakistan conflict , the range of the existing missiles was to be enhanced to 160 km (99 mi) via an upgrade programme involving both DRDO and the IAF.

=== Indonesia ===
On 7 July 2026, it was announced that India will supply Indonesia with the Astra missile system. Indonesian defense company Republikorp also signed an agreement with Bharat Dynamics on the production of Astra air-to-air missiles.

=== Export offers ===
India is offering the Astra missile family to substitute for the R-77 missile on the Su-27, Su-30, Su-35, and MiG-29 of other countries.

- Armenia: According to a report published in The Print on 14 September 2024, Armenia has inquired about the possibility of purchasing Astra Mk-1 for its Sukhoi Su-30s. Discussions are in early stages.
- Brazil: It was reported in August 2023 that Brazil was exploring possibility of equipping its Gripen fighters with Astra Mk-1 missiles as a cost-effective option.

== Variants ==
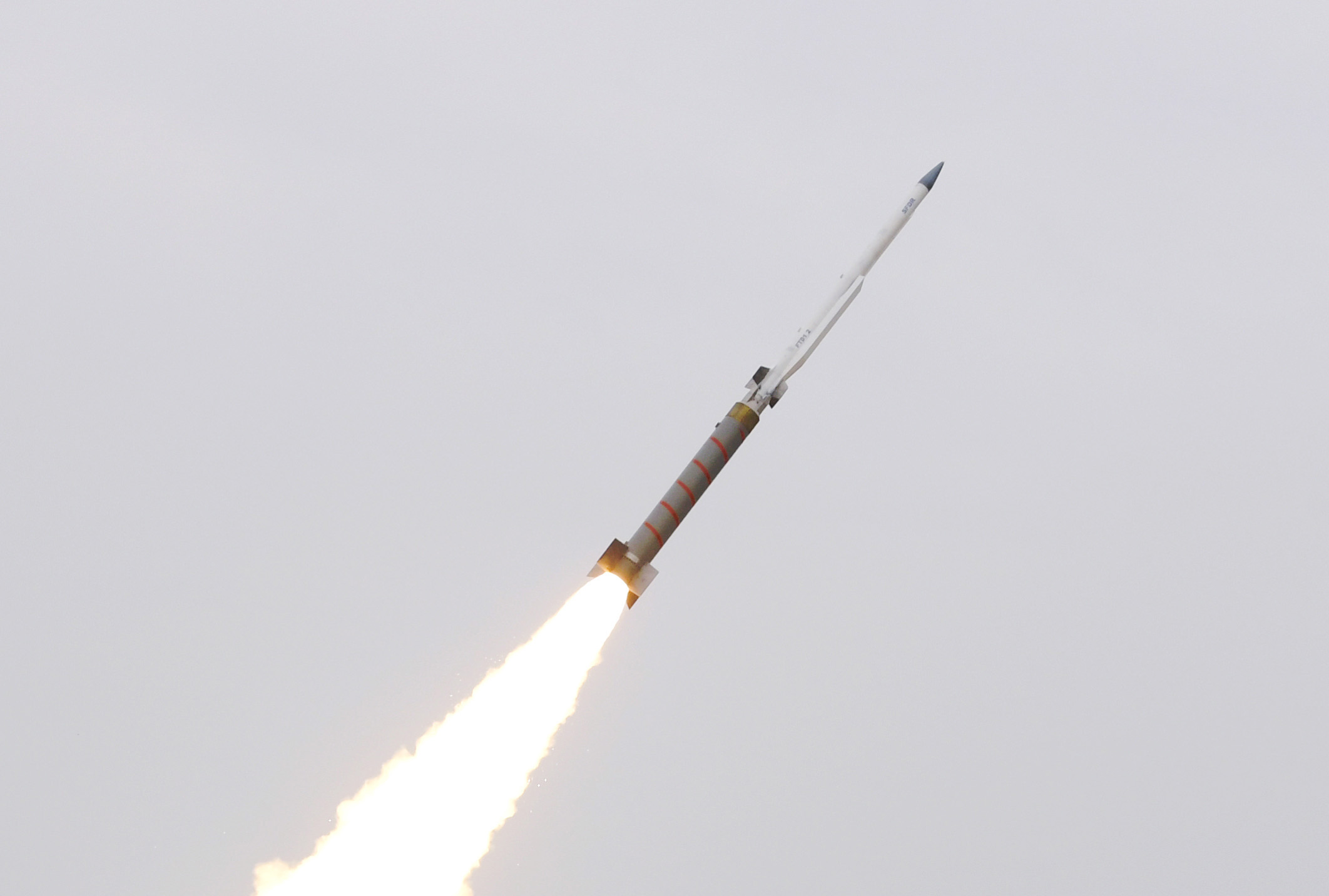
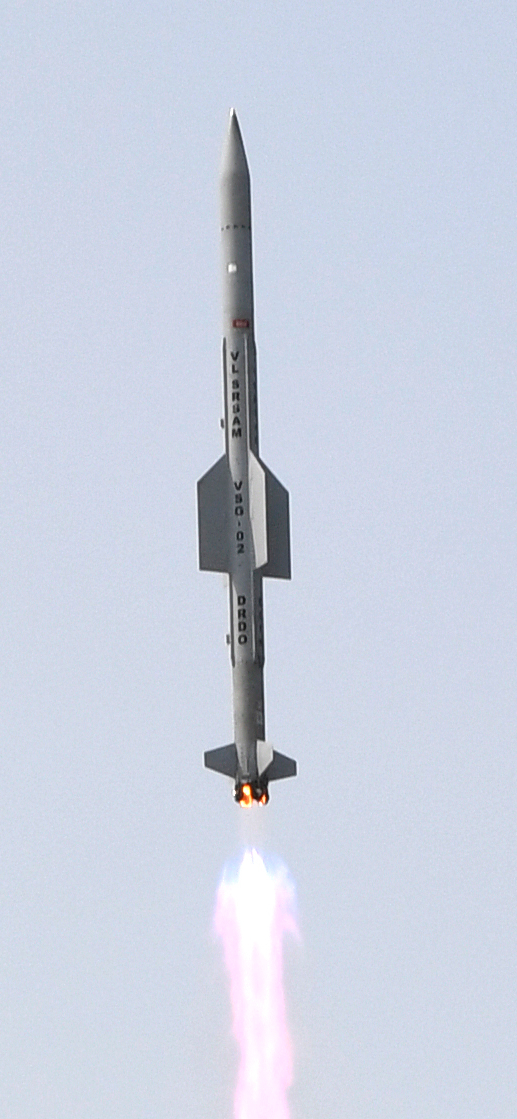
Solid Fuel Ducted Ramjet propulsion test in 2019 (left), VL-SRSAM test in 2021 (right)
- Astra Mk-1: Basic variant with a range of 110 km (68 mi).
- Astra Mk-2: Extended range variant with a maximum range in excess of 160–200 km (99–124 mi).
- Astra IR: A planned shorter ranged variant with an imaging Infra-red homing seeker with a range of 80 km (50 mi).
- Gandiva: The variant, designated as Astra Mk-3, is named after Gandiva of Arjuna from the Mahabharata. The missile, based on the Solid Fuel Ducted Ramjet, exhibits a maximum range of 340 km (210 mi). The missile enables combat aircraft to engage strategic targets including AEW&C, transport aircraft, in-flight refuellers, strategic bombers as well as enemy fighter aircraft at long distances.
- VL-SRSAM: It is the surface-to-air missile derivative of the Astra family based on Indian Navy's requirements to replace older Barak 1 short range SAM system. VL-SRSAM will equip Indian Navy ships like Kamorta-class corvette as a short range air defense system and guided by its Revathi radar.

== Operators ==
India

- Indian Air Force
- Indian Navy

=== Future operators ===
Indonesia

- Indonesian Air Force

=== Potential operators ===
Armenia

- Armenian Air Force: The Astra missile is among the Indian weapons sought to be integrated with their upgraded Su-30 fleet, in addition to other systems such as guided air-to-surface missiles.

== Gallery ==
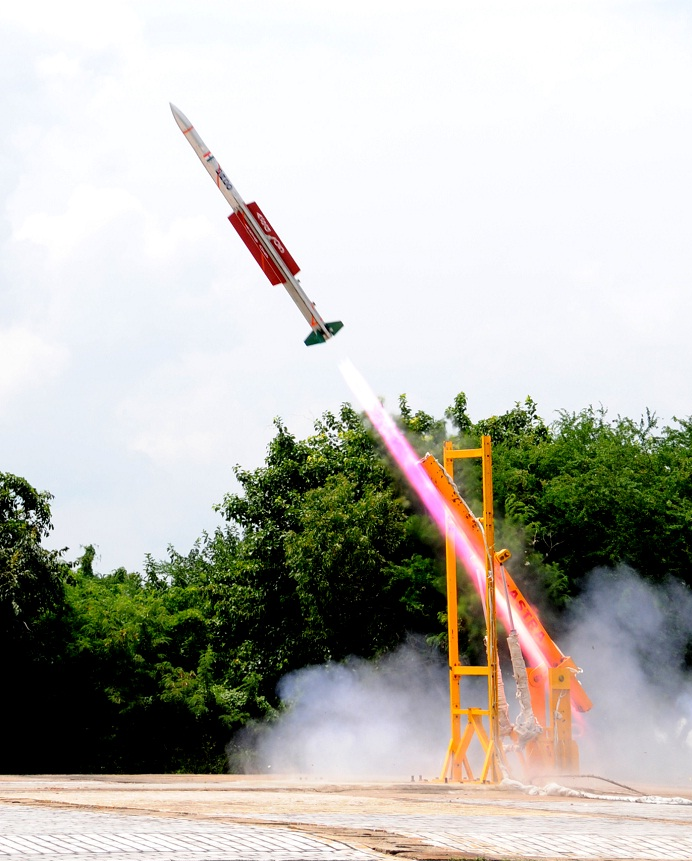
Astra tested from ground-based launcher during initial developmental trial.

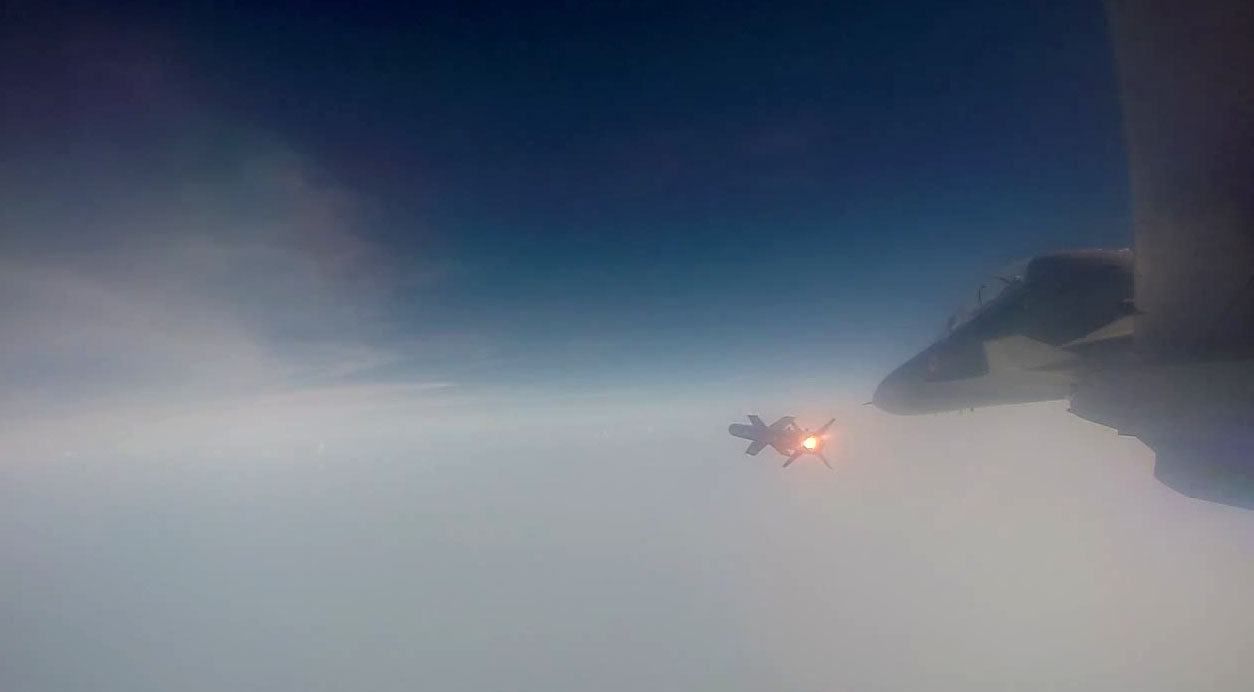
Astra fired from an Indian Air Force Su-30MKI

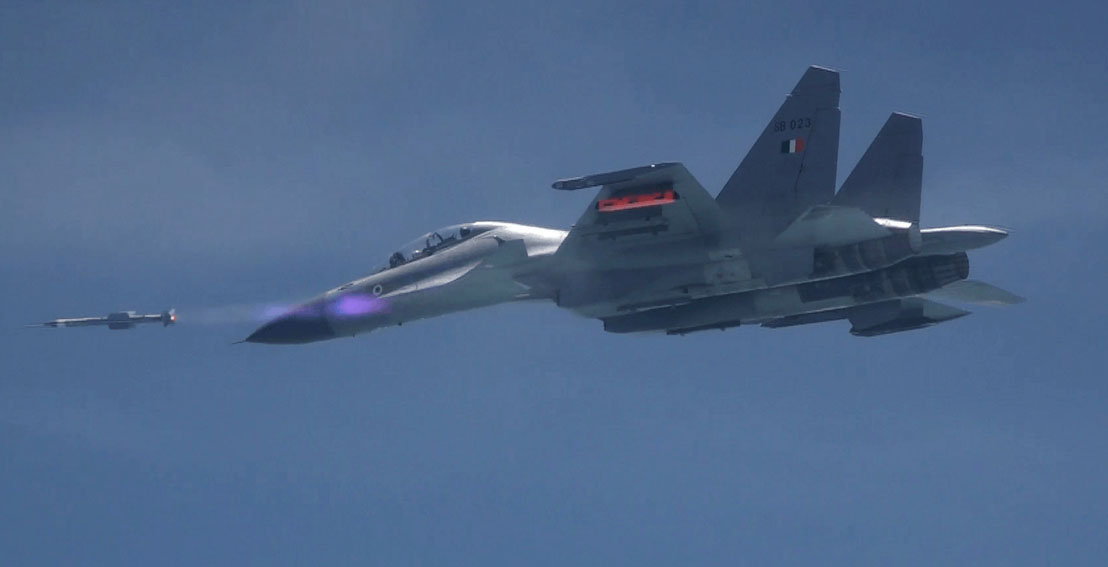
Su-30MKI fires an Astra missile

== See also ==
- AIM-120 AMRAAM – (United States)
- Derby – (Israel)
- MICA (missile) – (France)
- R-77 – (Russia)
- R-27EA – (Soviet Union)
- PL-12 – (China)
- R-Darter – (South Africa)
- Meteor – (France, United Kingdom, Italy, Germany, Spain, Sweden)
- PL-15 – (China)
