= Solid Fuel Ducted Ramjet =

Indian missile propulsion system

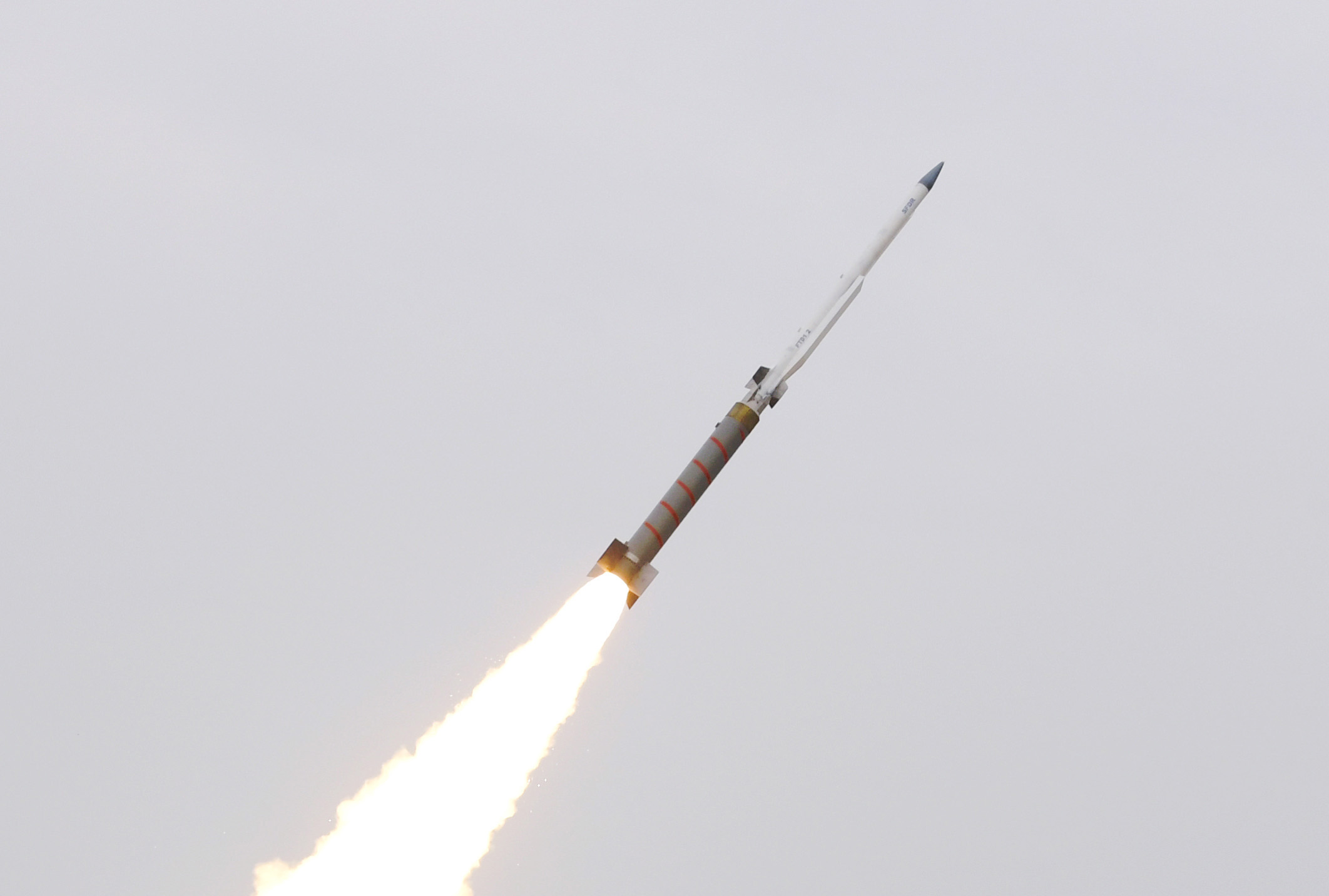
- SFDR based missile during its second flight
- Type: Missile propulsion system
- Place of origin: India

Production history
- Designer: Defence Research and Development Laboratory; Research Centre Imarat

Solid Fuel Ducted Ramjet (SFDR) is a missile propulsion system currently being developed by the Defence Research and Development Organisation of India. The project aims to develop critical technologies required in the propulsion systems of future Indian long range air-to-air missiles.

== Description ==
The Solid Fuel Ducted Ramjet (SFDR) is a missile propulsion system that includes a thrust modulated ducted rocket with a reduced smoke nozzle-less missile booster. The thrust modulation in the system is achieved using a hot gas flow controller. The system utilises a solid fuelled air-breathing ramjet engine. It is an extremely long-range missile with a projected range of 350 km. As per International Institute for Strategic Studies, this kind of propulsion system drastically enhances the range with higher average speed. The missiles which use such system are also able to carry larger payload due to absence of an oxidiser. Unlike solid-propellant rocket, the Ramjet takes up oxygen from the atmosphere during flight.

Officially, the technology is being developed to power future Indian air-to-air missiles. However, the technology can also be applied to surface-to-air missiles.

In its current form, the SFDR-based missile must first be boosted into a high-altitude trajectory to simulate aircraft-launch conditions. Subsequently, the nozzle-less booster fires up and guides the missile through its desired trajectory.

== Development ==
The development of the SFDR started in 2013 and envisaged a five-year deadline to begin actual demonstrations. The missile is being developed primarily by the Defence Research and Development Laboratory and Research Centre Imarat in Hyderabad. High Energy Material Research Laboratory developed the nozzle-less booster while the ramjet engine is being developed with Russian assistance. Ground-based testing of the missile started in 2017. As of 2023, the SFDR is among 55 high priority DRDO projects that have failed to meet project deadlines.

== Testing ==
- SFDR was tested for the first time on 30 May 2018. This was the first time where a nozzle-less booster test was demonstrated in India. The Economic Times reported that the missile test was partially successful as the second ramjet engine stage had failed to activate during the flight.
- The second test of the missile occurred on 8 February 2019, where its ramjet engine was successfully tested. The missile finally touched the ground after achieving the desired Mach number.
- DRDO conducts successful flight test of Solid Fuel Ducted Ramjet Technology from the Integrated Test Range (ITR), Chandipur, Odisha on 5 March 2021. "All subsystems, including the ground booster motor, performed as per our expectations", DRDO officials said.
- Another successful test was carried out on 8 April 2022 .The test demonstrated reliable functioning of all critical components involved in the complex missile system and met all the mission objectives.
- In November 2022, SFDR successfully demonstrated fuel flow controller actuation during flight.
- Gandiva, formerly Astra Mark 3, with solid-fuel ducted ramjet propulsion was put to test flight in 2023, enabling the missile to intercept airborne threats over a very long distance at supersonic speed. The missile was configured with nozzle-less booster, thrust modulation system and a sustainer motor to deliver specific impulse in ramjet mode.
- On 13 December 2024, the DRDO successfully conducted the final test of the Solid Fuel Ducted Ramjet (SFDR) propulsion based missile system from a static launcher at the Launch Complex-III of the Integrated Test Range in Odisha. The missile achieved a speed over Mach 3 and knocked out an aerial target successfully.
- On 3 February 2026 at 10:45 AM IST, DRDO conducted a demonstration flight trail for the SFDR from ITR Odisha. The subsystems including nozzle less booster, SFDR motor and fuel flow controller performed in textbook precision after it was propelled by a ground-based motor to the desired speed.

== See also ==
- Astra (missile)
- K-100 (missile)
