= Dual-thrust rocket motor =

Type of solid propellant rocket engine

In a dual-thrust solid propellant rocket engine, the propellant mass is composed of two different types (densities) of fuel. In the case of a tandem dual-thrust motor, the fuel nearest to the rocket nozzle burns fast, and the fuel further into the motor's body burns slower. This gives the rocket higher thrust initially, accelerating it rapidly to high speed. When all the fast-burning propellant has burnt, the slow-burning propellant delivers a lower level of thrust. The first phase of acceleration is called "boost" and the second phase "sustain". Not all dual-thrust motors are in a tandem arrangement but non-tandem motors function much the same; they just have a different physical layout of fuel. For example, they might burn from the inside to the outside (core burning), rather than from the end in (end burning).

The advantage of dual-thrust motors is that if the fuel were entirely the fast-burning type, the rocket would accelerate to a higher speed initially but because air resistance increases quadratically with speed, the rocket would slow very rapidly. This would give a higher peak speed but a lower average speed. Instead, the boost phase accelerates the rocket to a high enough speed (high enough to propel the rocket to its destination fast, but not high enough to cause excessive air resistance), and then the sustain stage allows the rocket to maintain this high speed until it burns out. Then it is able to coast, slowly losing speed.

Dual-thrust motors are most prevalent in rockets which are atmosphere-bound since they have to deal with air resistance over most of their flight. It is similar in concept to multistage rockets, but much simpler to design and build since there is no requirement to detach stages, have separate components, etc.
