= Cruciform wing =

A cruciform wing is a set of four individual wings arranged in the shape of a cross. The cross may take either of two forms; the wings may be equally spaced around the cross-section of the fuselage, lying in two planes at right angles, as on a typical missile, or they may lie together in a single horizontal plane about a vertical axis, as in the cruciform rotor wing or X-wing.

== Cruciform-wing missile ==
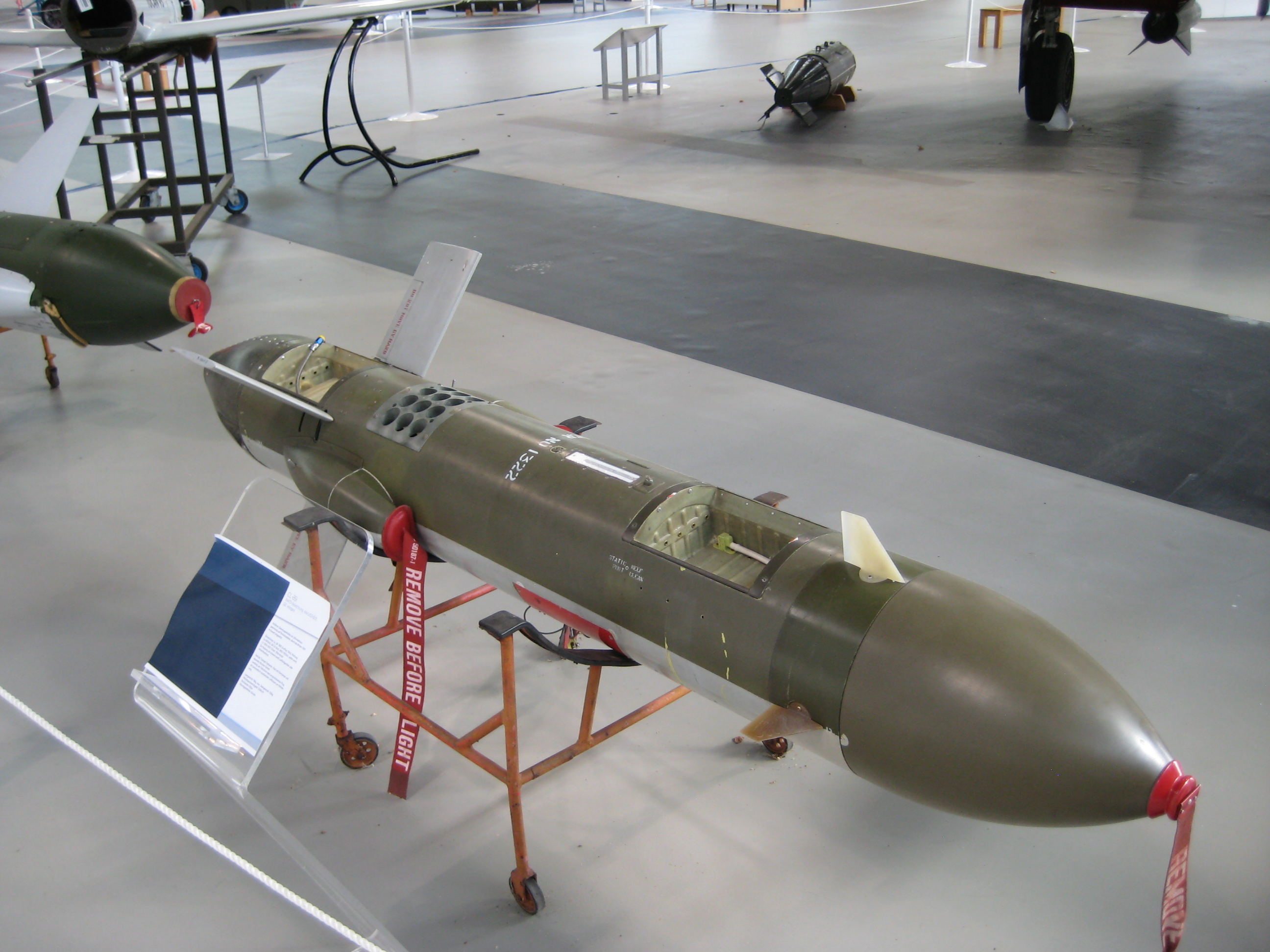
A Canadair CL-89 shows its cruciform wing

Rocket- and jet-propelled missiles often have a cruciform thin-wing arrangement in which four identical thin, low aspect ratio wings are equally spaced around a long, slender body. Cruciform wing missiles are sometimes called Cruciform wing weapons (CWW) in contrast to planar wing weapons (PWW).

For wings of equal size and shape, this gives constant aerodynamic characteristics whatever the aircraft's angle of roll or direction of turn.

However, because only half the total lift of the four surfaces is available in any given attitude, the configuration is less efficient than a conventional planar wing.

The missile may also have small cruciform canard foreplane surfaces for flight trim and/or control. These may be set at 45° to the main wing, in order to minimise interference.

The aerodynamic properties of such a slender wing-plus-body configuration are different from those of the individual elements and the design needs to be evaluated as a unified form. A characteristic of the off-axis side forces is that they are relatively independent of the angle of pitch or yaw.

== Cruciform rotor wing ==
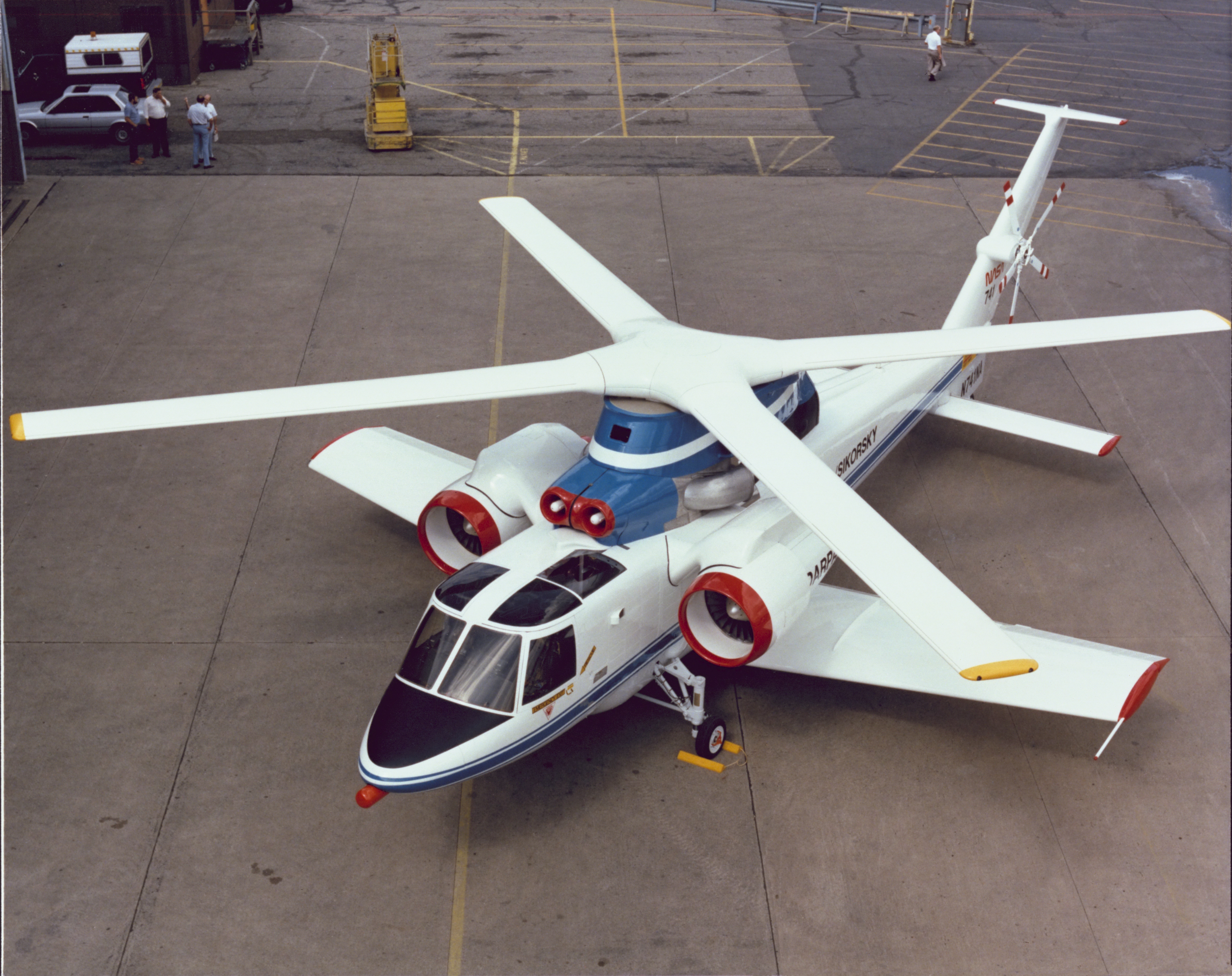
Sikorsky S-72 modified as the X-Wing testbed. It never flew.

The horizontal cruciform rotor wing, also known as the X-wing, is a form of the Stopped rotor.

Teledyne Ryan studied the concept in the 1970s and took out a number of patents. The X-Wing circulation control rotor was developed in the mid-1970s under DARPA funding. The concept was first developed by the David W. Taylor Naval Ship Research and Development Center and an experimental rotor built by Lockheed Corporation, for testing on the Sikorsky S-72 Rotor Systems Research Aircraft (RSRA).

Intended to take off vertically like a helicopter, the rigid rotor could be stopped in mid-flight to act as an X-shape cruciform wing providing lift during forward flight, assisting the RSRA's conventional fixed wings. Instead of controlling lift by altering the angle of attack of its blades as more conventional helicopters do, the craft used compressed air fed from the engines and expelled from its blades to generate a virtual wing surface, similar to blown flaps on a conventional platform. Computerized valves made sure the compressed air came from the correct edge of the rotor, the correct edge changing as the rotor rotated.

In late 1983 Sikorsky received a contract to modify the S-72 RSRA as a demonstration testbed for the X-Wing rotor and it was rolled out in 1986. The program was cancelled two years later, after the X-wing had been installed but before it had flown.

== Other proposed applications ==
=== Solar-powered aircraft ===
Around 1980 NASA was studying the technical aspects of long-duration solar-powered UAVs. One configuration studied was a very-high-aspect-ratio cruciform fixed wing with solar panels mounted along one plane of the wing. The craft was able to roll at any angle to follow the sun, thus maximising the power available without loss of lift.

=== Variable geometries ===
Bi-directional flying wing, plan view

Shortly after World War Two, the French company Matra began studies of a variable-geometry aircraft in which two sets of wings were provided, one for low-speed takeoff and landing, and the other for high-speed flight. Long-span wings for low speed flight were set at right angles to short-span wings for high-speed flight. One set lay horizontal for use as the lifting wings, while the other was set vertical. The supporting fuselage section could be rotated 90° to swap them over, and the unused set of wings could be folded backwards and partially or wholly retracted into the fuselage. It was patented by Matra's chief designer, Robert Roger, in 1946.

The bi-directional wing is a similar approach to the same problem. It comprises a long-span low speed wing and a short-span high speed wing joined in the form of an unequal cross. The craft would take off and land with the low-speed wing across the airflow, then rotate it a quarter-turn so that the high-speed wing faces the airflow for supersonic travel. It has been studied in the form of a bi-directional flying wing.
