= Next generation corvette =

Indian Navy corvette class

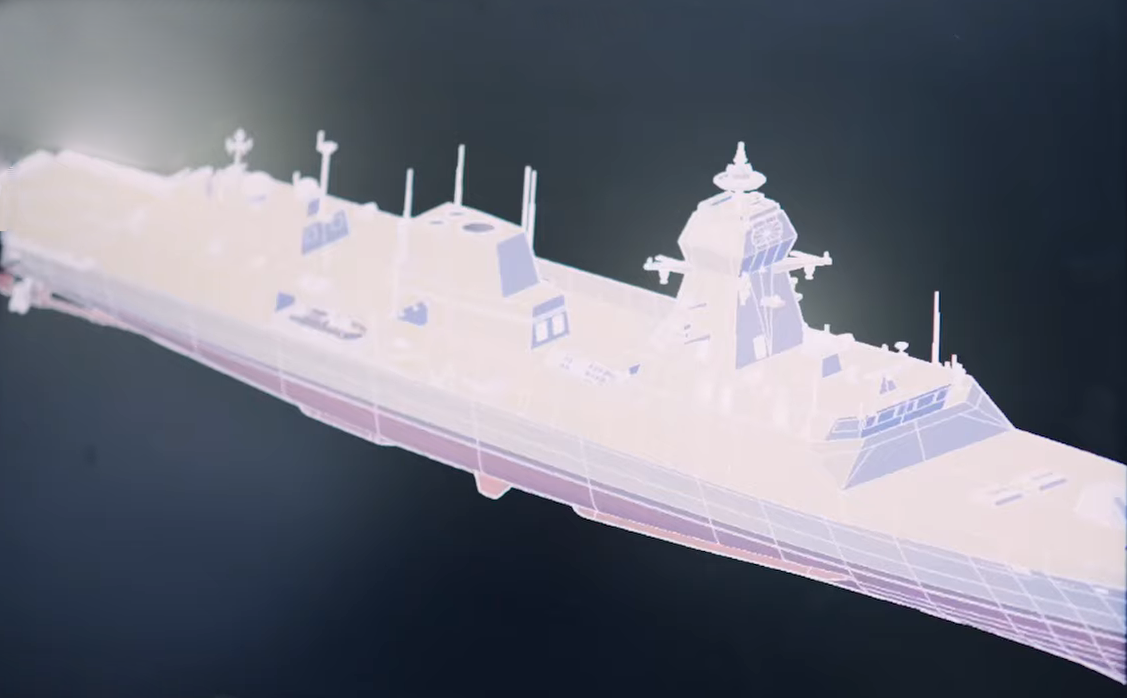
- NGC Design

Class overview
- Name: New Generation Corvettes
- Builders: Garden Reach Shipbuilders & Engineers (GRSE) - 3 ships; GRSE Partner Shipyard - 2 ships; Goa Shipyard Limited (GSL) - 2 ships; GSL Partner Shipyard - 1 Ship
- Operators: Indian Navy
- Preceded by: Next Generation Missile Vessels by antecedence; Khukri and Kora class by role
- Cost: ₹53,866.50 crore (US$5.6 billion) overall cost (FY 2026); ₹6,733.31 crore (US$700 million) per unit (FY 2026)
- Planned: 8

General characteristics (NGC)
- Type: Corvette
- Tonnage: 4,950 t (4,870 long tons) DWT
- Length: 127 m (416 ft 8 in)
- Beam: 17.6 m (57 ft 9 in)
- Draught: <4.5 m (14 ft 9 in)
- Installed power: 1 x LM-2500
- Speed: 26 knots (48 km/h; 30 mph) (Top); 20 knots (37 km/h; 23 mph) (Maximum sustained)
- Range: 4,000 nmi (7,400 km; 4,600 mi) at 14 kn (26 km/h; 16 mph)
- Endurance: 14 days (without replenishment at sea)
- Boats & landing craft carried: 1 × 7 metre RHIB
- Complement: 139 sailors and 11 officers
- Sensors & processing systems: Surface surveillance radar; Air surveillance radar; Fire-control radar; EO IRST; Hull-mounted sonar; Active towed array sonar; Combat Management System; MFSTAR radar
- Electronic warfare & decoys: 1 x Kavach Mod II
- Armament: 1 × OTO Melara 76 mm Super Rapid Gun Mount (SRGM) (BHEL-manufactured); 8 × NASM-MR; 24 × MRSAM; 1 × AK-630M CIWS; OFT 12.7 mm M2 Stabilised Remote Controlled Guns (with EO-based FCS); 2 × triple Torpedo Advanced Light Shyena
- Aviation facilities: Helicopter deck
- Notes: , Armament:

The Next Generation Corvette (NGC), or Project 28A, is a class of eight multi-role corvettes being built by Garden Reach Shipbuilders and Engineers and Goa Shipyard for the Indian Navy. Under this programme, the Indian Navy intends to acquire advanced ships to serve roles including anti-surface warfare, anti-submarine warfare, maritime interdiction operations (MIO), coastal defence and conduct operations in air, surface and sub-surface domains. Ships in this class will feature advanced stealth features like a low radar cross section (RCS), infrared, acoustic and magnetic signatures. The class will replace the Khukri and Kora-class corvettes.

== History ==
On 6 June 2022, the Defence Acquisition Council (DAC) under the Ministry of Defence cleared the acquisition proposal of the 8 Next-generation corvettes worth ₹36,000 crore (equivalent to ₹420 billion or US$4.3 billion in 2026) for the Indian Navy.

According to a report on 2 May 2024, the Next Generation Corvettes will be fitted with indigenous marine diesel engines which will be developed under the 'Make-I category' (Note: Make-I category: Projects under ‘Make-I’ sub-category will involve Government funding of 90%, released in a phased manner and based on the progress of the scheme, as per terms agreed between MoD and the vendor.). The development and manufacturing of the engines will probably be carried out by Kirloskar Oil Engines Ltd and Garden Reach Shipbuilders and Engineers Ltd (GRSE). The indigenous diesel engines could be reviewed onto two of Brahmaputra-class frigates during their upgrades. There is a reported demand for around thirty diesel engines, orders for which will be issued after the engine's successful development.

In May 2025, Garden Reach Shipbuilders & Engineers (GRSE) secured the lowest bidder (L1) position for constructing five Next Generation Corvettes (NGC) for the Indian Navy, under a ₹36,000 crore (equivalent to ₹370 billion or US$3.9 billion in 2026) contract. The contract for GRSE, valued at over ₹25,000 crore (equivalent to ₹260 billion or US$2.7 billion in 2026), covers five of the eight NGCs, with the remaining three to be built by the second-lowest bidder (L2) at the same unit cost. The shipyard participated in the Contract Negotiation Committee (CNC) meeting convened by the Defence Ministry on 21 May. As per reports, contract is expected to be signed within six months after negotiations.

The programme was awaiting clearance from the Cabinet Committee on Security (CCS) in March 2026. The eight corvettes, of which five will be built by GRSE and three by Goa Shipyard Limited (GSL), will likely succeed the Khukri and Kora-class corvettes.

By 12 May 2026, GRSE announced the completion of price negotiations for the ₹33,000 crore (US$3.4 billion) programme of five vessels. By June, the hydrodynamic performance assessment and model testing of the Next Generation Corvettes was successfully completed by the Naval Science and Technological Laboratory (NSTL) in Visakhapatnam in cooperation with the Warship Design Bureau (WDB). Samir V. Kamat, the then chairman of DRDO, officially handed over the project deliverables to Vice Admiral Sanjay Sadhu, the Controller of Warship Production and Acquisition (CWP&A).

On 29 October 2026, the CCS approved the projects. The warships would be based on a new in-house design of the Navy. The Ministry of Defence signed the contracts, worth ₹53,866.50 crore (US$5.6 billion), with GRSE and GSL on 2 November 2026. The contract for GRSE was values approximately at ₹32,000 crore (US$3.3 billion). The first vessel is expected by 2030. The unit cost of the ships, at ₹6,733 crore (US$700 million), is eight times that of the Arnala-class anti-submarine corvettes.

== Design ==
=== Dimensions and performance ===
The warships have a specific deadweight tonnage of 4,950 tonnes with a Combined Diesel and Gas Turbine–Cross-Connect (CODAG-CC) propulsion configutation connected with two controllable pitch propellers. They will have an endurance of 14 days without replenishment at sea and a maximum speed of 26 kn (48 km/h; 30 mph) with accommodation for 11 officers and 139 sailors. The ships have a length of 127 metres (417 ft) and a beam of 17.6 metres (58 ft). The ships will be built to the standards of a Naval Headquarters-approved classification society.

AstraYan, a IIT-Madras incubated deep tech startup emerged as the lowest bidder for GRSE's Propulsion System Integration (PSI) tender for its 5 ships. It outbid global majors in the tender which included Germany's RENK, Italy's Fincantieri, Spain's Navantia.

=== Weapons and sensors ===
The sensor suite of the corvettes includes a Multi-Function Surveillance, Track and Guidance Radar (MFSTAR) and Electro Optical Infrared Search and Track (EOIRST) system. The ships will be armed with a BHEL-manufactired OTO Melara 76 mm Super Rapid Gun Mount (SRGM), an AK-630M CIWS and OFT 12.7 mm M2 Stabilised Remote Controlled Guns with EO-based FCS along with Medium Range Anti-Ship Missiles (MR-AShM), Medium Range Surface-to-Air Missiles (MRSAM) and 324 mm torpedo tubes.

== Ships of the class ==
| Name | Penn. | Yard | Builder | Laid down | Launched | Delivered | Commissioned | Homeport | Status |
|---|---|---|---|---|---|---|---|---|---|
| TBA | | | GRSE | | | | | | Planned |
| TBA | | | GSL | | | | | | Planned |

== See also ==
- Future of the Indian Navy
