= Sea skimming =

Missile flight technique

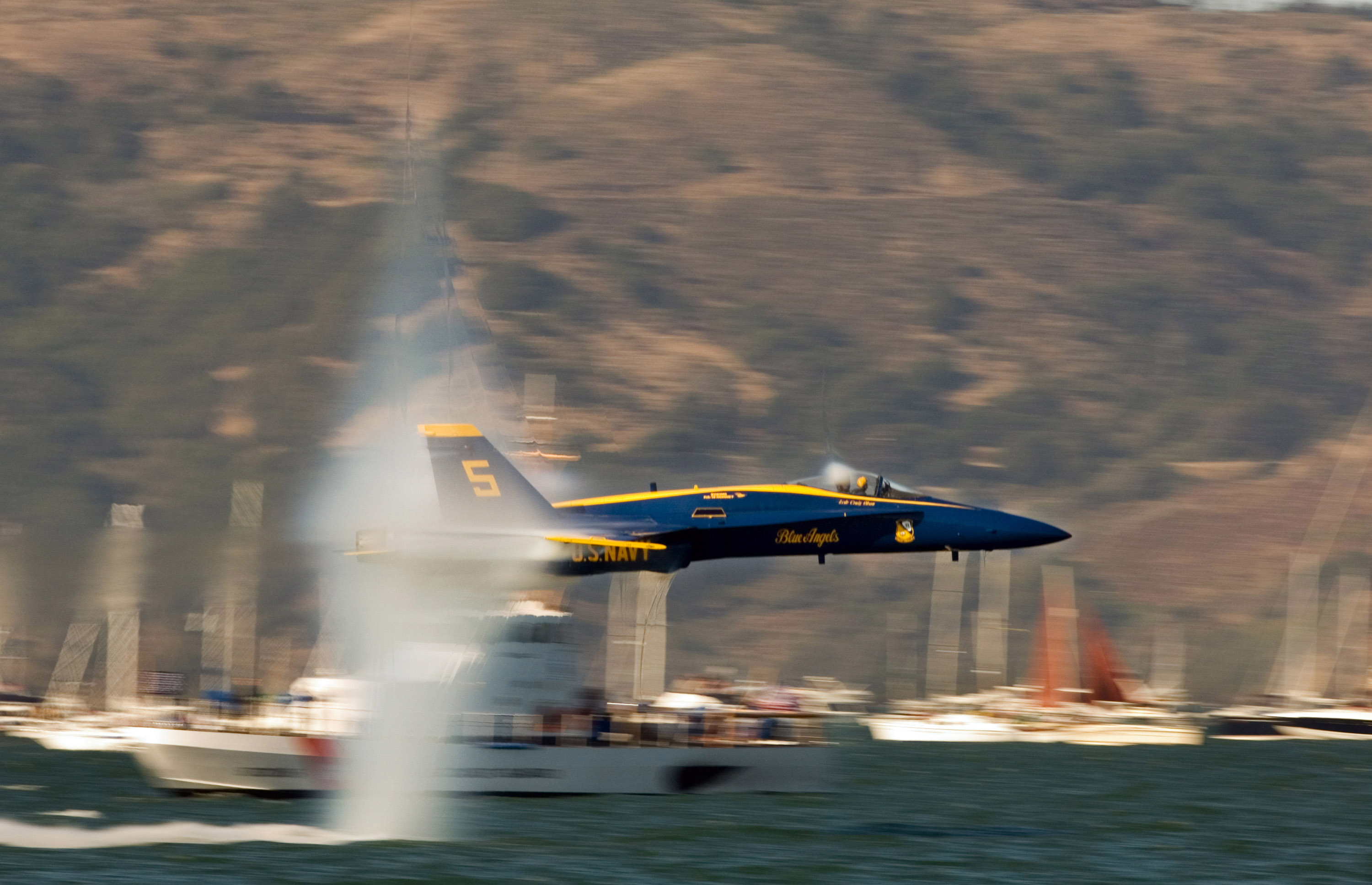
A US Navy Blue Angels pilot demonstrates sea skimming technique in a "sneak pass". The image shows a condensation cloud from a high-speed shockwave. (2005)

Sea skimming is a technique many anti-ship missiles and some fighter or strike aircraft use to avoid radar and infrared detection and to lower the probability of being shot down during their approach to the target.

== Method ==
The Brazilian anti-ship missile MANSUP adopts sea skimming flight profile after launch

Sea-skimming anti-ship missiles try to fly as low as is practically achievable, which is almost always below 50 meters (150 ft), and is often near 2 meters (6 ft). When under attack, a warship can detect sea-skimming missiles only after they appear over the horizon (about 28 to 46 km from the ship), allowing about 25 to 60 seconds of warning.

== Advantages ==
By flying low to the sea, missiles decrease the range at which the target ships can detect them by a significant amount. Flying at a low altitude increases the amount of time the missile is under the horizon from the perspective of the target ship, making it harder to detect due to radar clutter from the sea and similar effects. The real-life success of sea skimming depends on its exact implementation, the sophistication of the detection equipment, as well as the infrared and radar signature of the missile. Sea skimming can significantly reduce the available response time that a ship's missile defenses have to work within, making these missiles significantly harder to defend against. Sea skimming can also increase the range of a missile, by relying on ground effects.

== Disadvantages ==
The use of sea skimming increases the risk of water impact by the missile before reaching the target due to weather conditions, rogue waves, software bugs and other factors. Sea skimming also hinders target acquisition, as many of the principles that hinder the target's detection of the missile also hinder the missile's detection of the target. Sea skimming involves a significant computational load, increasing the required processing power and cost.

== Possible defenses ==
Several systems are capable of defeating sea skimming weapons.

== Use in major wars ==
French-made Exocet missiles were used by Argentina in the Falklands War (including the mortal wounding of HMS Sheffield) and by Iraq against USS Stark in the Persian Gulf during the Iran–Iraq War. The Argentinian pilots of the Super Étendard planes that attacked HMS Sheffield were also skimming the sea at very low level. They increased their altitude only for a very short period to get final target information for the attack with their Agave radars. During the 2022 Russian invasion of Ukraine, two Ukrainian-made R-360 Neptune sea-skimming cruise missiles were claimed to have struck and sank the Russian cruiser Moskva.

== See also ==
- Lofting (Missile technique)
