= Air Force Network =

Robust communication network of Indian Air Force

Air Force Network (AFNet) is an Indian Air Force (IAF) owned, operated and managed digital information grid. The AFNet replaces the Indian Air Force's (IAF) old communication network set-up using the tropo-scatter technology of the 1950s making it a true net-centric combat force. The IAF project is part of the overall mission to network all three services; The Indian Army, The Indian Navy and The Indian Air Force. The former Defence Minister AK Antony inaugurated the IAF's the AFNET on 14 September 2010 dedicating it to the people of India, for their direct or indirect participation in the communication revolution.

== Background ==
Armed Forces in India has been using troposcatters as primary means of military communications since the 1950s, thereby occupying huge and expensive 2G and 3G spectrums which otherwise could have been used for expanding and de-clogging the civilian wireless communication network. The rapid expansion of civilian mobile telephony leading to need for larger bandwidth for wireless communication and commercial need to operate the 3G network necessitated the Government of India to have the Indian Armed Forces vacate the spectrum occupied by them. Thus the government of India through Department of Telecommunication (DoT) started a project called "Network for Spectrum" to set up a fiber optics network for the exclusive use of Indian Armed Forces in exchange for spectrum being released by the Defence Forces. The aim of 'Network for Spectrum' being twofold - to facilitate the growth of national tele-density on the one hand, and ensuring modernization of defence communications with the state-of-the-art communication infrastructure, and to support net-centric military operations.

The Department of Telecom and the Ministry of Defence signed the memorandum of understanding for vacating the spectrum and setting up dedicated network for the use of defence forces. In this MoU, DoT agreed to laying of 40,000 route kilometres of optical fibre cable connecting 219 Army stations, 33 Navy stations and 162 points for the Air Force. It further agreed to setting up an exclusive defence band and Defence Interest Zone along 100 km of the international border, where spectrum will be reserved only for use by the Armed Forces. The total cost of implementing "Network for Spectrum" project is estimated to be ₹ 10,000 crores. AFNet is Indian Air Force component of Digital Information Grid under "Network for Spectrum" project and the AFNet has been extended and connected to the Digital Information Grid Project under implementation for the Indian Navy and the Indian Army on 2015.

== Project Origin ==
The Air Force Network (AFNet) had been developed by the Indian Air Force at a cost of ₹1,077 crore (US$235.53 million) in collaboration with HCL Technologies and Bharat Sanchar Nigam Limited. It will replace the Air Force's more than half-a-century-old telecom network. This project is part of the defence ministry's initiative to digitize the communication systems of the three armed forces under "Network for Spectrum" initiative to improve coordination among themselves and other Military and Strategic Institution. IAF was the first to complete this gigabyte digital information grid implemented under the AFNet project. AFNet will be connected and extended to a Unified Digital Grid encompassing all the legs of Indian Armed Forces.

The then defence minister, A. K. Antony, inaugurated the AFNet, IAF's gigabyte digital information grid. The grid is aimed at improving the network-centric warfare capability of the Air Force. The event also saw the presence of other personalities including the then Minister of Communication & IT, A. Raja; the Marshal of the Air Force, Arjan Singh; the Chief of the Air Staff, the Chief of the Army Staff and other officials from the three services and members of the Industry. The event also featured a practice interception of a simulated aerial target by a MiG-29 which took off from an airbase in the Punjab sector using the AFNet capabilities. Further capabilities in line with network centric warfare were also demonstrated. This included sharing information, videos and pictures by operational assets and platforms like UAVs and AWACS to decision-makers who are several hundred kilometres apart.

== Technology, Design & Structure ==
AFNet transmits data using Internet Protocol (IP) packets over the network using Multiprotocol Label Switching (MPLS). A Voice over Internet Protocol (VoIP) layer with stringent quality of service enforcement supports voice, video, and conferencing solutions.

AFNet will prove to be an effective force multiplier for intelligence analysis, mission planning and control, post-mission feedback and related activities like maintenance, logistics and administration. A comprehensive design with multi-layer security precautions for “Defence in Depth” have been planned by incorporating encryption technologies, Intrusion Prevention Systems to ensure the resistance of the IT system against information manipulation and eavesdropping. The network is secured with a host of advanced state-of-the-art encryption technologies. It is designed for high reliability with redundancy built into the network design itself.

The AFNet is also capable of transmitting video from unmanned surveillance aircraft (UAV), pictures from airborne warning and control systems (AWACS) to decision makers on the ground and providing intelligence inputs from remote areas.

The AFNet is also expected to facilitate accelerated economic growth by providing radio frequency spectrum for telecommunication purposes. AFNET will be the largest Multi-protocol Label Switching (MPLS) network in the defence segment.

== Demonstration ==
At the AFNet launch, the IAF showcased a practice interception of simulated enemy targets by a pair of Mig-29 fighter aircraft airborne from an advanced airbase in the Punjab sector using the gigabyte digital information grid. During the AFNet-assisted operations, the Indian fighter jets neutralised intruding targets in the western sector, which was played out live on the giant screens at the Air Force auditorium offering a glimpse of the harnessed potential of the system. The final orders for engaging the enemy targets were issued live by Antony, whose queries about how the operation went were responded to by the pilot as "excellent".

Various other functionalities contributing towards Network Centric Warfare were also showcased. These consisted of facilitating video from Unmanned Aerial Vehicle (UAV), pictures from an AWACS aircraft to the decision-makers on ground sitting hundreds of kilometres away, providing intelligence inputs from far-flung areas at central locations seamlessly. This was possible mainly because of the robust networking platform provided by AFNet.

== Integrated Air Command and Control System ==
Integrated Air Command and Control System (IACCS) is an automated command and control system for air defence operated by the Indian Air Force. IACCS operations rides the AFNET backbone integrating all ground-based and airborne sensors, air defense weapon systems and command and control (C2) nodes. Subsequent integration with other services networks and civil radars will provide an integrated Air Situation Picture to operators to carry out AD role.

The project was envisaged in 1995 following the Purulia arms drop case and was a part of IAF’s first Air Power Doctrinal manual issued in the 2000s, later revised in 2022. The first node in the western sectors had been operationalised by September 2010. The first five nodes located in the western and south western sectors were commissioned in 2011. The Air Force was preparing to seek clearance for five further nodes which would cover the rest of the nation including the island territories.

Through the IACCS, IAF will connect all of its space, air and ground assets quickly, for total awareness of a region. This will offer connectivity for all the ground platforms and airborne platforms (including AEW&C), as a part of the network centricity of IAF. The IACCS also facilitates real-time transport of images, data and voice, amongst satellites, aircraft and ground stations.

By 2018, five IACCS nodes had been established including Barnala (Punjab), Wadsar (Gujarat), Aya Nagar (Delhi), Jodhpur (Rajasthan) and Ambala (Haryana). Following this, under Phase-II, 4 additional nodes and 10 sub-nodes are to be set up. The major nodes will be established in the Eastern, Central, Southern and Andaman and Nicobar sectors. The second phase will cost ₹8,000 crore (equivalent to ₹120 billion or US$1.2 billion in 2026).

IACCS successfully integrated all operating radars, including its own, the Army's, and civilian ones, in 2023. This enabled the autonomous firing response capability to take down incoming missiles, aircraft, and UAVs.

The Akashteer system of the Indian Army is being integrated with the IACCS to increase jointness of the Armed Forces for air defence. This brings the radars of the Army through Akashteer and the Air Force radars and civilian radars through the IACCS under the Joint Air Defence Centre (JADC) level. Post integration, IAF will be in charge of the JADC. As of January 2025, integration for one site is complete while that for other sites are underway.

The IACCS system was a part of India's Air Defence Network during Operation Sindoor where the system effectively foiled multiple of Pakistan's drone and missile attacks.

As of June 2025, the Indian Air Force proposed to set up an Air Defence Centre, which hosts advanced sensors and radars, in Kozhikode district, Kerala. Two months earlier IAF had submitted the formal letter for land acquisition. The site would be 40-acre land at NIRDESH, Chaliyam. IACCS will be integrated with Mission Sudarshan Chakra.

As reported in December 2025, the IAF has started the third phase of "upgradation and modernisation" of the IACCS. This phase will implement nodes equipped with threat evaluation modules which will be able to assist in prioritisation of targets based on their information and profile. Reportedly, a "stand off weapon launch detection system" has also bee deployed. This will include the introduction of Long Range vectors and Precision Strike with a focus on the Beyond Visual Range capability. The IACCS has plans to incorporate a system to keep ground commanders informed about any launch of friendly drones and loitering munitions tasked to destroy enemy air defences. The IACCS has also inducted software-defined radios to relay voice data communication. As of May 2026, the IACCS equipment at seven locations were being relocated and refurbished with new components and equipment to remove risks of single point failure at networked tactical nodes (NTN), which are operational elements of the control and reporting centres.

=== Radar systems ===
==== Arudhra MPR ====
The Medium Power Radar, christened Arudhra, is the first indigenous S band, rotating active phased array multi-function 4D radar with digital beamforming technology. The system was developed by the Electronics and Radar Development Establishment (LRDE) of the Defence Research and Development Organisation (DRDO). The radar is tasked for volumetric surveillance. The radar has an instrumented range of 400 km (250 mi) and can detect a target with 2 m^{2} RCS at a range of up to 300 km (190 mi). It also has an altitude coverage of 100 m (330 ft) to 30 km (98,000 ft). In rotation mode, the radar provides continuous 360° azimuth with a 30° elevation at 7.5 / 15 rpm speed whereas, in staring mode, it offers a fixed horizontal field with the same elevation. It is also integrated with a co-located identification friend or foe. It is meant to replace the PSM-33, P-40 and TRS-2215 class of radars.

The technologies developed under the MPR project has multiple deployment applications including land-based stations in mountainous terrain to potential ship-borne applications. An Army-specific variant, the Air Defence Tactical Control Radar (ADTCR), has also been developed as a successor to the INDRA and P-19 family of radars. The radar is ready for user trials.

On 23 March 2025, the Ministry of Defence placed an order worth over ₹2,800 crore (equivalent to ₹29 billion or US$300 million in 2026) for the procurement of 16 Arudhra radars from Bharat Electronics Limited (BEL) for the Indian Air Force.

On 7 September 2026, the Defence Acquisition Council of the Ministry of Defence cleared the acquisition of the Arudhra radars for the Indian Navy in order to replace exisiting Air Route Surveillance Radars in the Naval Air Stations.

==== Ashwini LLTR ====
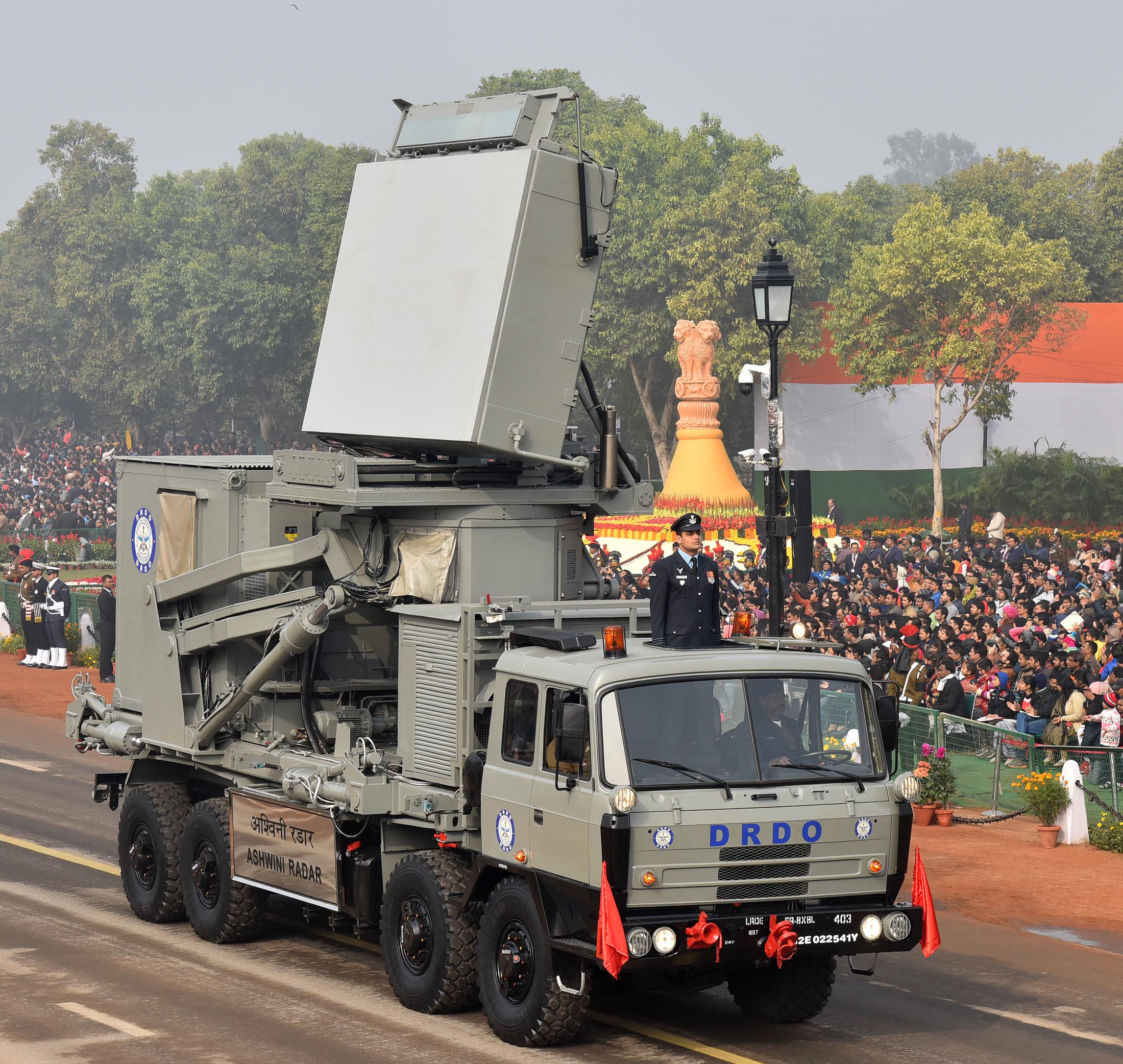
Ashwini radar during Republic Day Parade 2018

The Low-Level Transportable Radar (LLTR), also known as Ashwini, is an S band, rotating active phased array multi-function 4D radar developed by the LRDE of the DRDO. The radar is primarily used for early-warning and airspace surveillance roles and can track and detect air targets including fighter aircraft, helicopters and unmanned aerial vehicles (UAVs) flying at low altitudes. This is a vehicle-mounted transportable variant of Arudhra. It can be used as a plug-in solution to address early-warning capability gaps in the airspace. The radar has a maximum range of 200 km (120 mi) and can detect a target with 2 m^{2} RCS at a range of 150 km (93 mi). It also has an altitude coverage of 30 m (98 ft) to 15 km (49,000 ft). In rotation mode, the radar provides continuous 360° azimuth with a 40° elevation at 7.5 / 15 rpm speed whereas, in staring mode, it offers a fixed horizontal field with the same elevation. Meanwhile, the desired coverage is achieved using a wide transmit beam and multiple simultaneous receive beams using the digital beamforming-based (DBF) active array calibration technology.

On 12 March 2025, the defence ministry placed an order worth ₹2,906 crore (equivalent to ₹30 billion or US$310 million in 2026) for the procurement of Ashwini radars from BEL for the Indian Air Force.

==== Surya VHF radar ====
In mid-March 2025, IAF received the first of six anti-stealth VHF radar Surya from Alpha Defence Technologies, a Bengaluru-based firm, under a contract of less than ₹200 crore (equivalent to ₹207 crore or US$21 million in 2026). The radar has been deployed to detect and track stealth and low-observable aircraft. It will complement BEL's Ashwini Low-Level Transportable Radar (LLTR). The radar has been configured on two 6×6 trucks. The radar has maximum detection range of 360 km (220 mi) for a 2 m^{2} RCS target and the radar antenna has a rotation speed of 10 rpm. The system was with DRDO.

==== Nebo-UM ====
The Indian Air Force first publicly displayed a Nebo-UM radar during the 2026 edition of Exercise Vayushakti in February. It is an anti-stealth VHF radar.

==== High Power Radars (HPR) ====
A Request For Information (RFI) was released in 2016 by the Indian Ministry of Defence to purchase 12 High Power Radars for the Indian Air Force. The then Defence Minister, N. Sitharaman, led the DAC meeting where the purchase of the radars was approved. The THD-1955 3-D radars, which have a maximum range of 600 km, will be replaced by these High Power Radars. The radars will be integrated with IACCS.

On 22 February 2024, Cabinet Committee on Security (CCS) cleared the procurement of HPRs under a project of ₹6,000 crore (equivalent to ₹64 billion or US$660 million in 2026). Further, on 1 March 2024, Ministry of Defence signed a contract with Larsen & Toubro. According to the statement, the HPRs contracted will replace the lAF's current long-range radars with contemporary active aperture phased array-based HPRs with advanced surveillance features. By integrating sophisticated sensors that can detect small radar cross section targets, the HPRs will also significantly improve the IAF's terrestrial air defence capabilities.

==== Mountain radars ====
On 5 August 2025, the Defence Acquisition Council (DAC) accorded the Acceptance of Necessity (AoN) for the procurement of Mountain Radars for the Indian Air Force. A budget of ₹440 crore (equivalent to ₹454 crore or US$47 million in 2026) was sanctioned. This is a variant of the Arudhra Medium Power Radar (MPR), of which 16 base variants and an unknown number of transportable variants are already on order. Under the Mountain Radar Project, the Air Force will deploy a chain of radars along the Line of Actual Control which is expected to match the number of radars and extended-range systems, collectively termed as the "radar platter", employed by the People's Liberation Army.

The Ministry of Defence placed an order for two Mountain Radars and their associated equipment and required infrastructure with the Bharat Electronics Limited (BEL) at a cost of ₹1,950 crore (US$200 million) on 31 March 2026. The non-transportable radar was developed by the Electronics and Radar Development Establishment (LRDE), DRDO. The radars will reportedly by deployed in Gulmarg, Jammu and Kashmir and Pfütsero, Nagaland. Further units wll be inducted based on the performance of these radars.

==== Long-Range Surveillance Radar ====
On 8 April 2026, the Indian Air Force (IAF) issued a request for information (RFI) to acquire Long-Range Surveillance Radars to replace legacy systems which were inducted in the mid-1970s. The new mobile, vehicle-mounted radar systems are expected to detect and track ballistic and cruise missiles, alongside aircraft and drones having low radar cross section, high speed and high-altitude profile. It should have a detection range of over 450 km (280 mi) and altitude up to 40 km (25 mi) with 360° coverage. The radar should be capable of classifying targets into their respective categories including large, medium and small fixed-wing aircraft, rotary wing aircraft and UAV on its own. The design should be Gallium Nitride (GaN) technology-based 4D electronically scanning phased array system. Further, the main radar antenna vehicle should be co-located with an integrated identification of friend and foe (IFF) system as well as an X-band radar for drone detection with a fused or associated display.

== See also ==
- Mission Sudarshan Chakra - proposed multi-layer defense system for India
