= Integrated Guided Missile Development Programme =

Indian Ministry of Defence programme

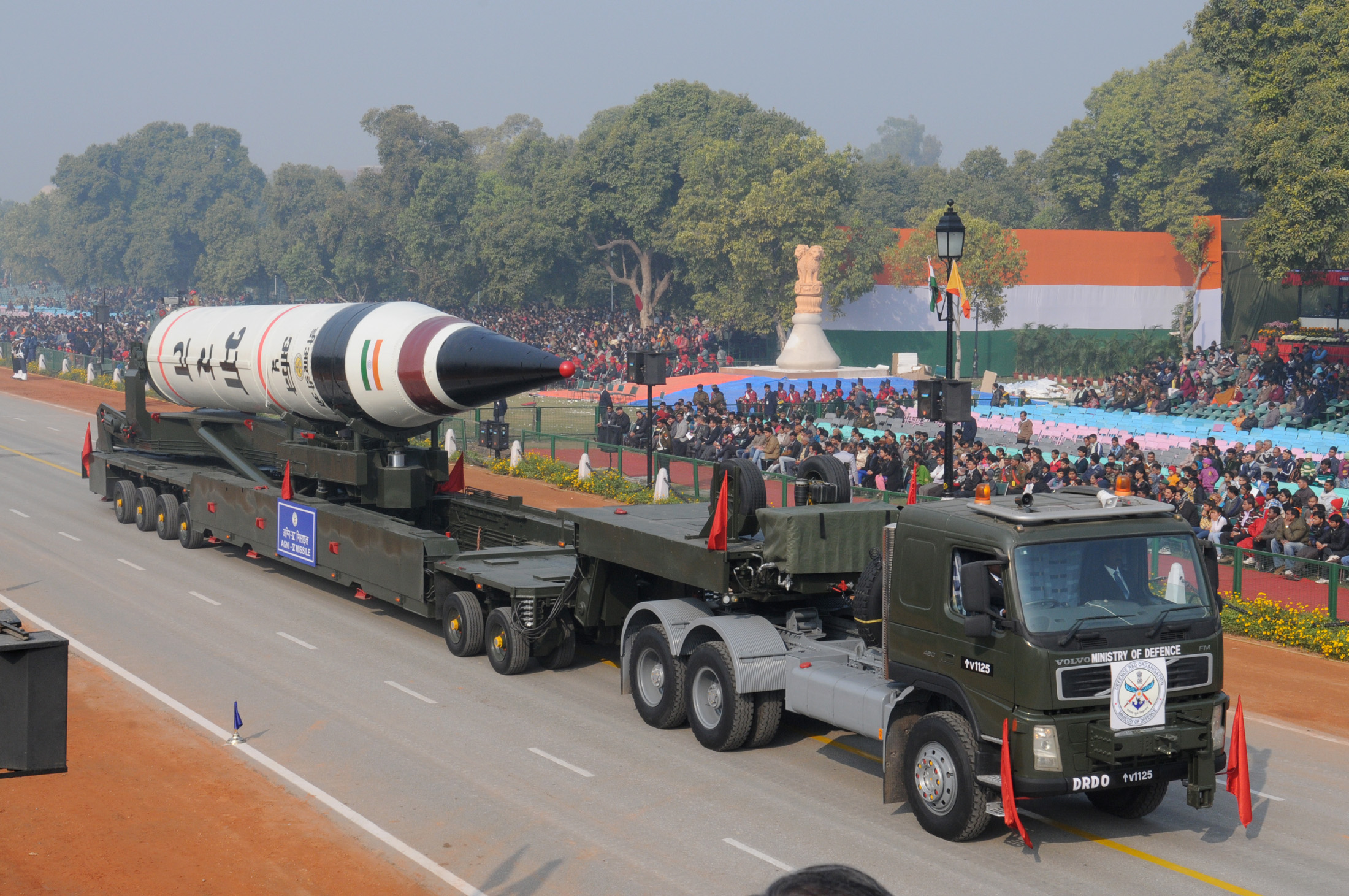
Agni-V missile during rehearsal of Republic Day Parade 2013

The Integrated Guided Missile Development Programme (IGMDP) was an Indian Ministry of Defence programme for the research and development of the comprehensive range of missiles. The programme was managed by the Defence Research and Development Organisation (DRDO) and Ordnance Factories Board in partnership with other Indian government political organisations. The project started in 1982–83 under the leadership of Abdul Kalam who oversaw its ending in 2008 after these strategic missiles were successfully developed.

On 8 January 2008, the DRDO formally announced the successful rated guided missile programme was completed with its design objectives achieved since most of the missiles in the programme had been developed and inducted by the Indian Armed Forces.

== History ==
By the start of the 1980s, the Defence Research and Development Laboratory (DRDL) had developed competence and expertise in the fields of propulsion, navigation and manufacture of aerospace materials based on the Soviet rocketry technologies. Thus, India's political leadership, which included Prime Minister Indira Gandhi, Defence Minister R. Venkataraman and V.S. Arunachalam, the Scientific Advisor to the Defence Minister, decided that all these technologies should be consolidated.

This led to the birth of the Integrated Guided Missile Development Programme with Dr. Abdul Kalam, who had previously been the project director for the SLV-3 programme at the Indian Space Research Organisation (ISRO), was inducted as the DRDL Director in 1983 to conceive and lead it. While the scientists proposed the development of each missile consecutively, the Defence Minister R. Venkataraman asked them to reconsider and develop all the missiles simultaneously. Thus, four projects, to be pursued concurrently, were born under the IGMDP:

- Dr. APJ Abdul Kalam started multiple projects simultaneously to develop the following types of Indian Guided Missiles missiles.
  1. Short Range Surface to Surface Missile (SSM) ‘Prithvi’
  2. Long Range Surface to Surface Missile (SSM) ‘Agni’
  3. Medium Range Surface to Air Missile (SAM) ‘Akash’
  4. Short Range Surface to Air Missile (SAM) ‘Trishul’
  5. Anti-tank Guided Missile (ATGM) ‘Nag’

The Agni missile was initially conceived in the IGMDP as a technology demonstrator project in the form of a re-entry vehicle, and was later upgraded to a ballistic missile with different ranges. As part of this program, the Interim Test Range at Balasore in Odisha was also developed for missile testing.

=== Hurdles ===
After India test-fired the first Prithvi missile in 1988, and the Agni missile in 1989, the Missile Technology Control Regime (then an informal grouping established in 1987 by Canada, France, Germany, Italy, Japan, the United Kingdom and the United States) decided to restrict access to any technology that would help India in its missile development program. To counter the MTCR, the IGMDP team formed a consortium of DRDO laboratories, industries and academic institutions to build these sub-systems, components and materials. Though this slowed down the progress of the program, India successfully developed indigenously all the restricted components denied to it by the MTCR.

=== Regional influence ===
The starting of India's missile program influenced Pakistan to scramble its resources to meet the challenge. Like India, Pakistan faced hurdles to operationalize its program since education on space sciences was never sought. It took Pakistan decades of expensive trial errors before their program became feasible for military deployment.

== Prithvi ==
The Prithvi missile (from Sanskrit पृथ्वी pṛthvī "Earth") is a family of tactical surface-to-surface short-range ballistic missiles (SRBM) and is India's first indigenously developed ballistic missile. Development of the Prithvi began in 1983, and it was first test-fired on 25 February 1988 from Sriharikota, SHAR Centre, Pottisreeramulu Nellore district, Andhra Pradesh. It has a range of up to 150 to 300 km. The land variant is called Prithvi while the naval operational variant of Prithvi I and Prithvi III class missiles are code named Dhanush (meaning "Bow"). Both variants are used for surface targets.

The Prithvi is said to have its propulsion technology derived from the Soviet SA-2 surface-to-air missile. Variants make use of either liquid or both liquid and solid fuels. Developed as a battlefield missile, it could carry a nuclear warhead in its role as a tactical nuclear weapon.

Missile	Type	Warhead	Payload (kg)	Range (km)	Dimension (m)	Fuel/stages	Weight (kg)	In service	CEP (m)
Prithvi-I	Tactical	Nuclear, HE, submunitions, FAE, chemical	1,000	150	8.55X1.1	Single stage liquid	4,400	1988	30–50
Prithvi-II	Tactical	Nuclear, HE, submunitions, FAE, chemical	350–750	350	8.55X1.1	Single stage liquid	4,600	1996	10–15
Prithvi-III	Tactical	Nuclear, HE, submunitions, FAE, chemical	500–1,000	350–600	8.55X1	Single stage solid	5,600	2004	10–15

The initial project framework of the IGMDP envisioned the Prithvi missile as a short-range ballistic missile with variants for the Indian Army, Indian Air Force and the Indian Navy. Over the years the Prithvi missile specifications have undergone a number of changes. The Prithvi I class of missiles were inducted into the Indian Army in 1994, and it is reported that Prithvi I missiles are being withdrawn from service, being replaced with Prahar missiles. Prithvi II missiles were inducted in 1996. Prithvi III class has a longer-range of 350 km, and was successfully test fired in 2004.

== Agni re-entry technology ==
A technology demonstrator for re-entry technology called Agni was added to IGMDP as Prithvi was unable to be converted to a longer ranged missile. The first flight of Agni with re-entry technology took place in 1989. The re-entry system used resins and carbon fibres in its construction and was able to withstand a temperature of up to 3000 °C. The technologies developed in this project were eventually used in the Agni series of missiles.

The United States would later accuse India that it's SLV-3 rocket was a copied derivative of the Scout rocket, and the Agni-I and Agni-II missiles (with SLV-3 design heritage) combined it with a liquid fuelled stage from an SA-2 missile. The US would also claim German,French and Russian complancy for the rocket, with the Germans supplying most major technologies and the testing wind-tunnel models. The Indian scientists have opposed it, stating that the rocket was built for peaceful exploration purposes..

== Trishul ==
Trishul (Sanskrit: त्रिशूल, meaning trident) is the name of a short range surface-to-air missile developed by India as a part of the Integrated Guided Missile Development Program. It has a range of 12 km and is fitted with a 5.5 kg warhead. Designed to be used against low-level (sea skimming) targets at short range, the system has been developed to defend naval vessels against missiles and also as a short-range surface-to-air missile on land. According to reports, the range of the missile is 12 km and is fitted with a 15 kg warhead. The weight of the missile is 130 kg. The length of the missile is 3.5 m. India officially shut down the project on 27 February 2008. In 2003, Defence Minister George Fernandes had indicated that the Trishul missile had been de-linked from user service and would be continued as a technology demonstrator.

== Akash ==
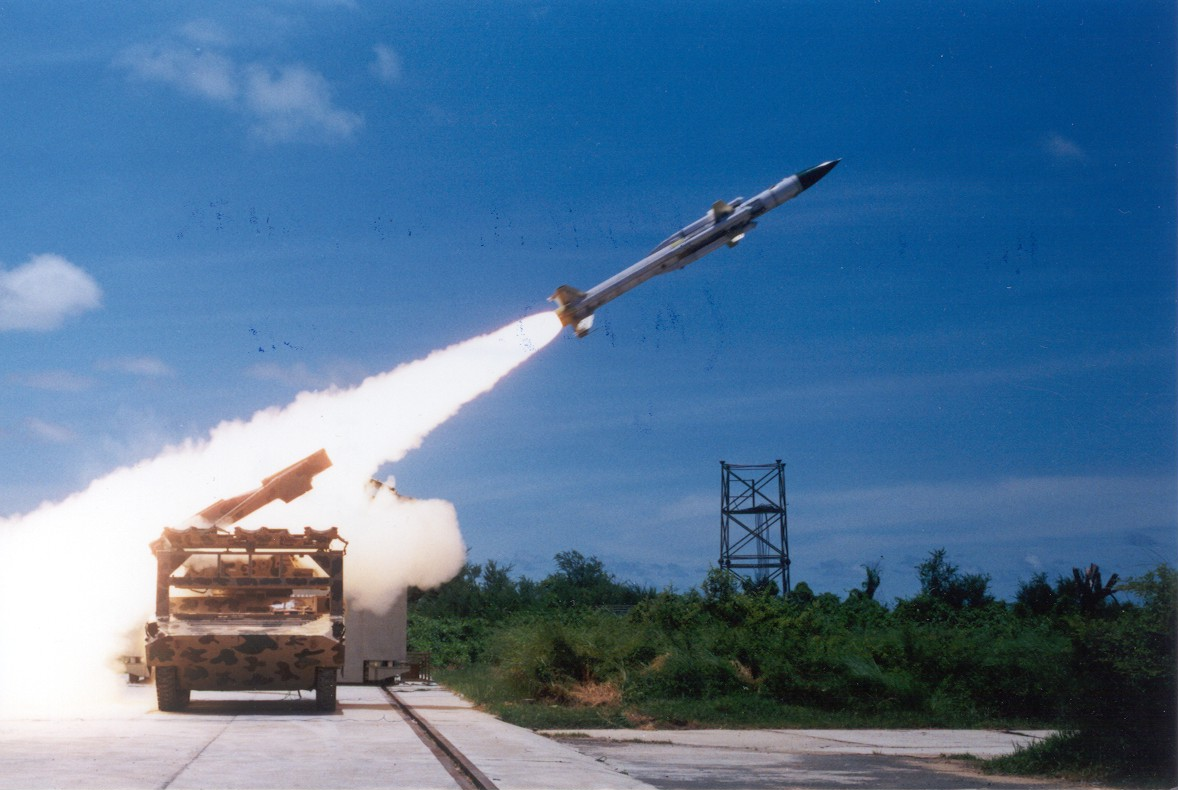
An Akash missile being test fired from the Integrated Test Range (ITR), Chandipur, Orissa. The launch platform is a BMP-2 vehicle.

Akash (Sanskrit: आकाश meaning Sky) is a medium-range surface-to-air missile developed as part of India's Integrated Guided Missile Development Programme to achieve self-sufficiency in the area of surface-to-air missiles. It is the most expensive missile project ever undertaken by the Union government in the 20th century. Development costs skyrocketed to almost US$120 million, which is far more than other similar systems.

Akash is a medium-range surface-to-air missile with an intercept range of 30 km. It has a launch weight of 720 kg, a diameter of 35 cm and a length of 5.8 metres. Akash flies at supersonic speed, reaching around Mach 2.5. It can reach an altitude of 18 km. A digital proximity fuse is coupled with a 55 kg pre-fragmented warhead, while the safety arming and detonation mechanism enables a controlled detonation sequence. A self-destruct device is also integrated. It is propelled by a solid fuelled booster stage. The missile has a terminal guidance system capable of working through electronic countermeasures. The entire Akash SAM system allows for attacking multiple targets (up to 4 per battery). The Akash missile's use of ramjet propulsion system allows it to maintain its speed without deceleration, unlike the Patriot missiles. The missile is supported by a multi-target and multi-function phased array fire control radar called the 'Rajendra' with a range of about 80 km in search, and 60 km in terms of engagement.

The missile is completely guided by the radar, without any active guidance of its own. This allows it greater capability against jamming as the aircraft self-protection jammer would have to work against the high-power Rajendra, and the aircraft being attacked is not alerted by any terminal seeker on the Akash itself.

Design of the missile is similar to that of the SA-6, with four long tube ramjet inlet ducts mounted mid-body between wings. For pitch/yaw control four clipped triangular moving wings are mounted on mid-body. For roll control four inline clipped delta fins with ailerons are mounted before the tail. However, internal schema shows a completely modernised layout, including an onboard computer with special optimised trajectories, and an all-digital proximity fuse.

The Akash system meant for the Indian Army uses the T-72 tank chassis for its launcher and radar vehicles. The Rajendra derivative for the Army is called the Battery Level Radar-III. The Air Force version uses an Ashok Leyland truck platform to tow the missile launcher, while the Radar is on a BMP-2 chassis and is called the Battery Level Radar-II. In either case, the launchers carry three ready-to-fire Akash missiles each. The launchers are automated, autonomous and networked to a command post and the guidance radar. They are slewable in azimuth and elevation. The Akash system can be deployed by rail, road or air.

The first test flight of Akash missile was conducted in 1990, with development flights up to March 1997.

The Indian Air Force (IAF) has initiated the process to induct the Akash surface-to-air missiles developed as a part of the Integrated Guided Missile Development Programme. The Multiple target handling capability of Akash weapon system was demonstrated by live firing in a C4I environment during the trials. Two Akash missiles intercepted two fast moving targets in simultaneous engagement mode in 2005 itself. The Akash System's 3-D central acquisition radar (3-D car) group mode performance was then fully established.

In December 2007, the IAF completed user trials for the Akash missile system. The trials, which were spread over ten days, were successful, and the missile hit its target on all five occasions. Before the ten-day trial at Chandipur, the Akash system's ECCM Evaluation tests were carried out at Gwalior Air force base while mobility trials for the system vehicles were carried out at Pokhran. The IAF had evolved the user Trial Directive to verify the Akash's consistency in engaging targets. The following trials were conducted: Against low-flying near-range target, long-range high-altitude target, crossing and approaching target and ripple firing of two missiles from the same launcher against a low-altitude receding target. Following this, the IAF declared that it would initiate the induction of 2 squadrons strength (each squadron with 2 batteries) of this missile system, to begin with. Once deliveries are complete, further orders would be placed to replace retiring SA-3 GOA (Pechora) SAM systems. In February 2010, the Indian Air Force ordered six more squadrons of the Akash system, taking orders to eight of the type. The Indian Army is also expected to order the Akash system.

== Nag ==
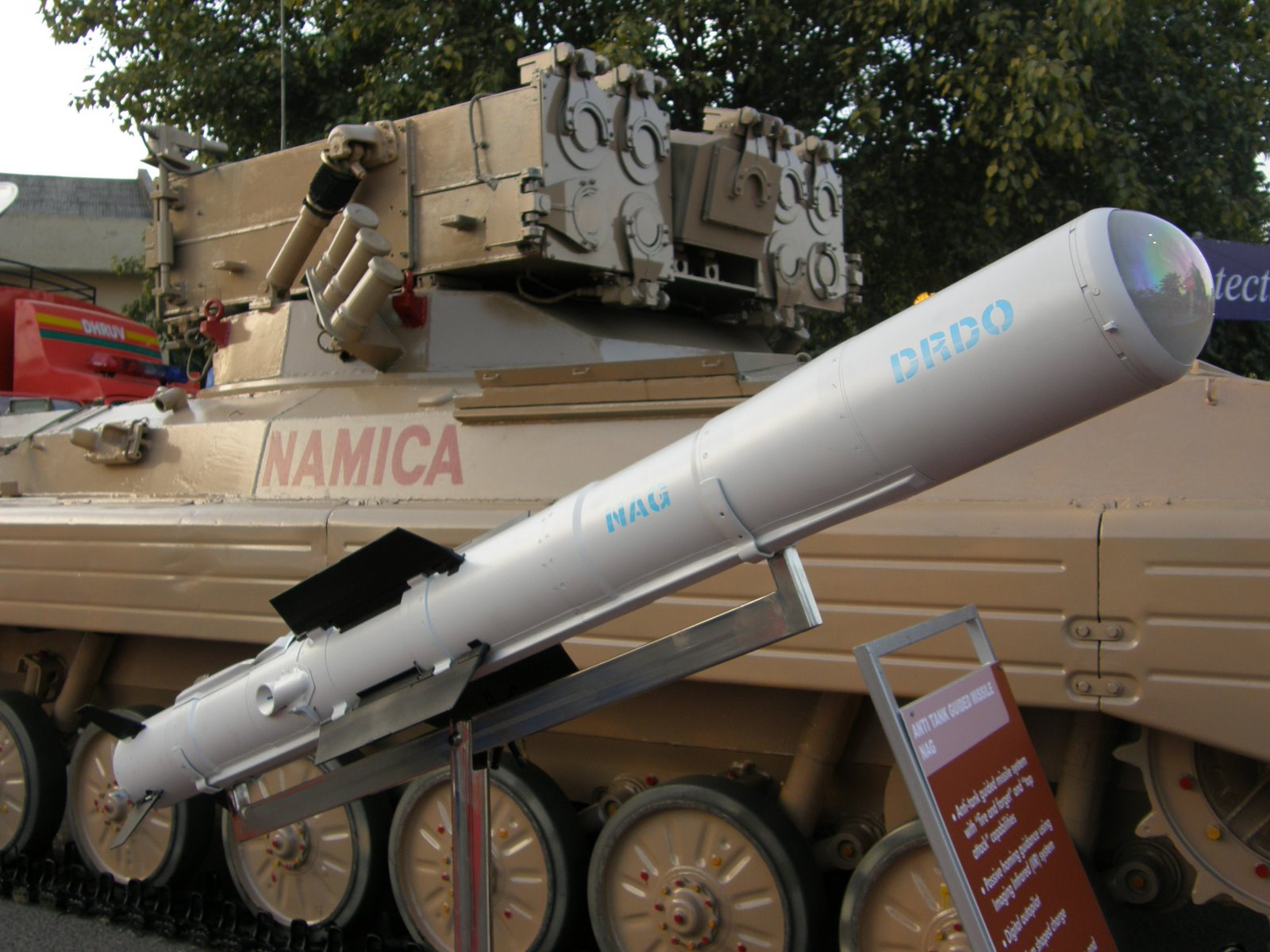
Nag Missile

Nag (Sanskrit: नाग meaning cobra) is India's third generation "fire-and-forget" anti-tank missile. It is an all weather, top attack missile with a range of 0.5 to 4 km.

The missile uses an 8 kg high-explosive anti-tank (HEAT) tandem warhead capable of defeating modern armour including explosive reactive armour (ERA) and composite armour. Nag uses imaging infra-red (IIR) guidance with day and night capability. Mode of launch for the IIR seeker is LOBL (lock-on before launch). Nag can be mounted on an infantry vehicle; a helicopter launched version will also be available with integration work being carried out with the HAL Dhruv.

Separate versions for the Army and the Air Force are being developed. For the Army, the missiles will be carried by specialist carrier vehicles (NAMICA-Nag Missile Carrier) equipped with a thermographic camera for target acquisition. NAMICA is a modified BMP-2 infantry fighting vehicle licence produced as "Sarath" in India. The carriers are capable of carrying four ready-to-fire missiles in the observation/launch platform which can be elevated with more missiles available for reload within the carrier. For the Air Force, a nose-mounted thermal imaging system has been developed for guiding the missile's trajectory "Helina". The missile has a completely fiberglass structure and weighs around 42 kg.

Nag was test fired for the 45th time on 19 March 2005 from the Test Range at Ahmednagar (Maharashtra), signalling the completion of the developmental phase. It will now enter the production phase, subject to user trials and acceptance by the Indian Army.

Further versions of the missile may make use of an all-weather milli-metre wave (MMW) seeker as an additional option. This seeker has reportedly been developed and efforts are on to integrate it into the missile.

== See also ==
- List of Indian military missiles
- Rajendra Radar
- SA-6 Gainful
- Agni missile system
- List of missiles
- Dongfeng
