= BFSR =

BFSR may refer to:

- Bank Financial Strength Rating (Moody's) or Bank Fundamental Strength Rating (Standard & Poor's), a specialised form of credit rating
- Battlefield surveillance radar
  - BFSR-SR, short-range battlefield surveillance radar used by the Indian Army
- Behaviorists For Social Responsibility, a special interest group of the Association for Behavior Analysis International
- Boston Free Speech rally
