= VRS-SRS =

Vietnamese military radar

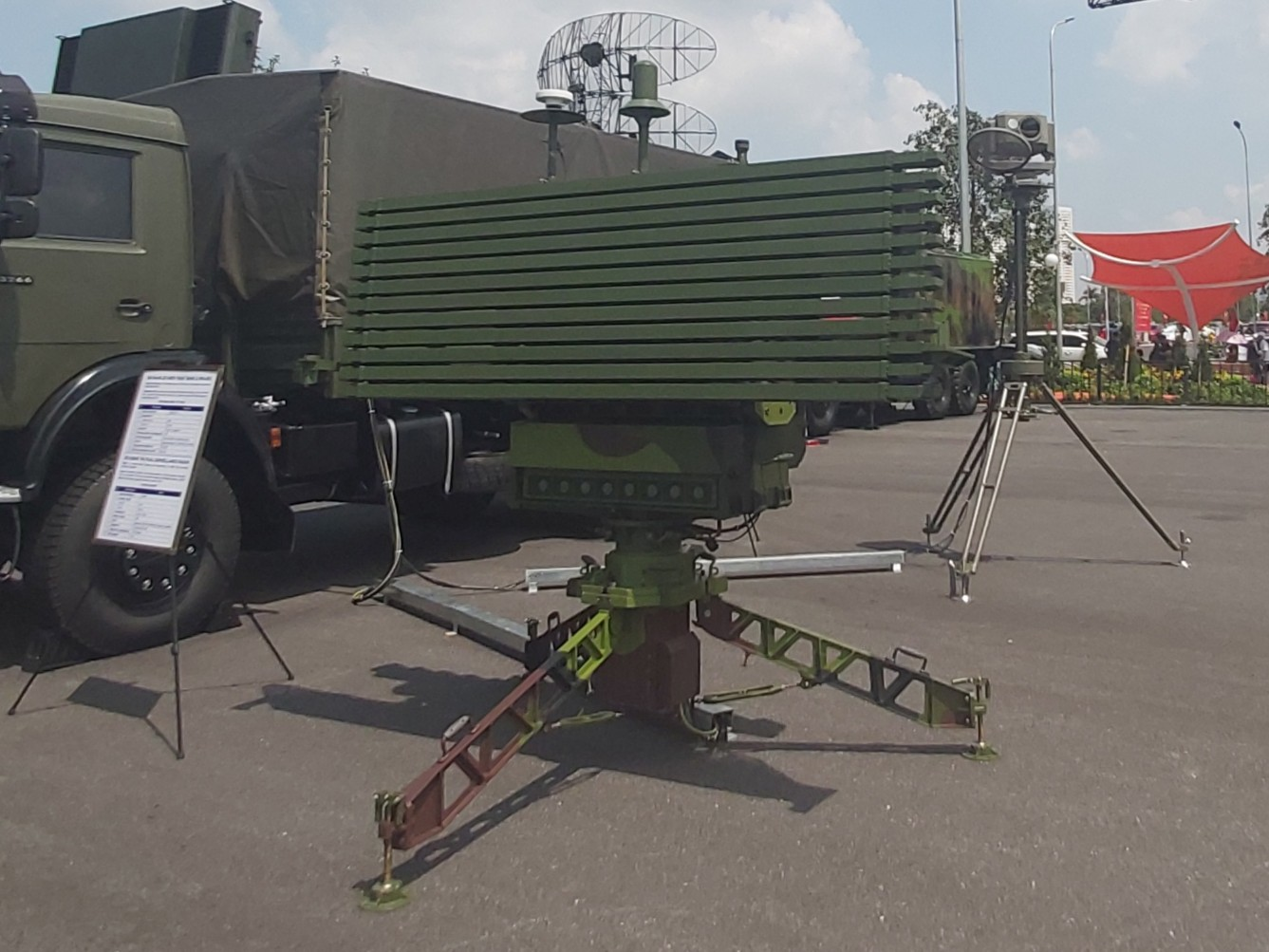
- VRS-SRS radar with VEE-LRA optoelectronic station in behind, as seen in a 2025 exhibition in Vietnam.
- Country of origin: Vietnam
- Manufacturer: Viettel Manufacturing
- Designer: Viettel High Tech
- Introduced: 2020
- No. built: More than 40 (2024)
- Type: Tactical, short-range air surveillance radar
- Frequency: S band
- RPM: Up to 12 rpm
- Range: 100 km (62 mi)
- Altitude: 25 km (16 mi)
- Azimuth: 360°
- Other names: VRS-S54S

The VRS-SRS (Vietnam/Viettel Radar System - Short-Range S-band), also marketed as the VRS-S54S, is a Vietnamese tactical air-defence radar system that is developed and manufactured by Viettel Group, a state-owned enterprise that is affiliated to the country's Ministry of National Defence. First introduced to the public in 2022, the system has been widely deployed by Vietnam Air Defence - Air Force's units as a domestic and affordable solution for the country's lower-tier anti-air warfare.

Acknowledging the necessity to develop the capabilities to detect drones and cruise missiles in the multi-layered air-defence warfare of the Vietnam People's Army amid the lack of a suitable and affordable foreign solution, in 2018, the Vietnam Ministry of National Defence appointed Viettel to research for a 3D radar. The development of VRS-SRS was cited being done by 2020, with "entirely indigenous core technologies". As of mid-2024, the Government of Vietnam revealed that Viettel has delivered more than 40 VRS-SRS systems to the country's air defence service, in contracts that worth trillions of Vietnamese dong.

== Characteristics ==
Operating in S band, VRS-SRS utilizes slot antenna with beamforming - the technologies that Viettel High Tech (VHT) has previously developed for its 5G equipments - enabling the radar to provide information on the target's range, azimuth, altitude, speed and moving direction. As a tactical system, it is designed to be portable and modularized with a tripod mounting, allowing short, easy deployment and retrieval time of not more than 30 minutes, even in unfavorable environments, conditions and terrains.

VRS-SRS can detect aerial targets at a range of 100 km (62 mi; 330,000 ft) and altitude of 25 km (16 mi; 82,000 ft), which is claimed to have 1.6-time better detection range against helicopters and 2-time better the elevation angle measurement accuracy than foreign competitors of the same class, while being able to simultaneously track not at least 60 targets. The radar also has electronic counter-countermeasure (ECCM) and anti-jamming capabilities with automatic jammer reconnaissance, frequency hopping, and sidelobes suppression.

In operations, VRS-SRS is often seen being paired with a Viettel VEE-LRA (LMS-GS) multi-channel long-range electro-optical station, collectively known as SRS-LRA, for multi-perspective and multi-layered awareness against various threats. It can be integrated into Vietnam's C4ISR anti-air command and control network.

== Operational history ==
As of 2024, it was reported that Viettel has delivered more than 40 systems to the Vietnam Air Defence - Air Force Service. VRS-SRS was seen temporarily deployed on top of shopping malls' rooftops and helipads to monitor the Air Force's operations, for example, to oversee the 2025 flyover in Ho Chi Minh City celebrating the 50th anniversary of the Reunification of Vietnam. It is also spotted at many Vietnamese air bases, probably serving as ground-control radars.

In 2026, Viettel internal media revealed that it has delivered an unspecified number of VRS-S54S to Laos by late 2025.

== Operators ==
Vietnam

- Air Defense - Air Force Service - more than 40 stations.

Laos

- Lao People's Liberation Army Air Force
