= BEL Battle Field Surveillance Radar =

Battlefield and perimeter surveillance radar

Battlefield Surveillance Radar – Short Range
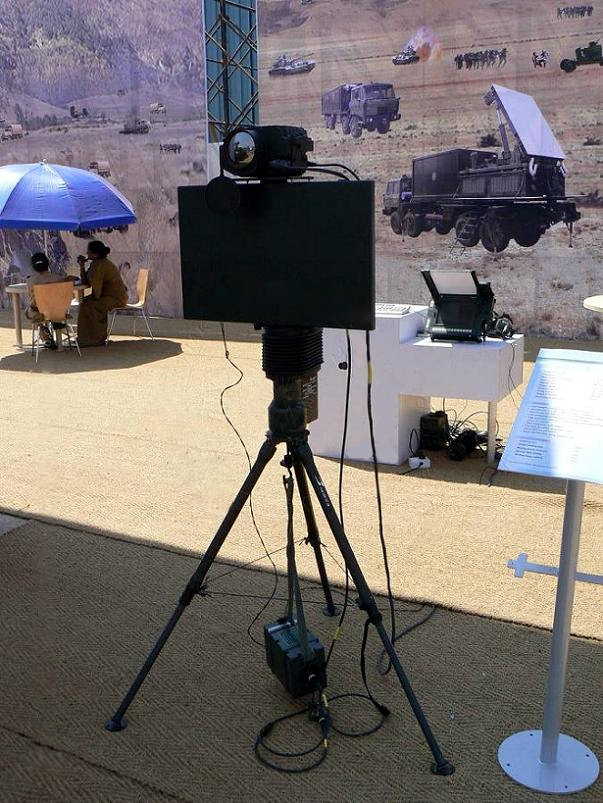
- BEL BFSR-SR display at Aero India-2007. The Display unit is seen in the background. This BFSR unit has an integrated Thermal imaging camera on top of the Radar Array. The power battery is suspended from the tripod for added stability.
- Country of origin: India
- Manufacturer: Bharat Electronics Limited
- Designer: Electronics and Radar Development Establishment (DRDO)
- No. built: 1400+
- Frequency: J band
- Range: Crawling Man : 700 m (0.43 mi); Walking Man : 3 km (1.9 mi); Group of people : 7 km (4.3 mi); Light Vehicles : 10 km (6.2 mi); Heavy Vehicles : 14 km (8.7 mi)
- Azimuth: 30-180°
- Elevation: -40 to +15°
- Precision: ±20 meters (66 ft)
- Power: 80 W
- Other names: PJT-531

The PJT-531 Battle Field Surveillance Radar – Short Range (BFSR-SR) is a man portable 2D short-range battlefield and perimeter surveillance radar developed by the Indian Defence Research and Development Organisation (DRDO). The BFSR has been designed by DRDO's Bengaluru-based laboratory, the Electronics and Radar Development Establishment (LRDE) and is being manufactured by Bharat Electronics Limited (BEL).

BFSR has found use in the Indian border areas, especially along the Line of Control (LoC) in Jammu and Kashmir to prevent infiltration. Over 1,100 units are in use by the Indian Army. Foreign countries have also placed orders for the BFSR.

Over 1,400 BFSRs are now being used by the Army against moving surface targets. A BFSR radar that offers foliage penetration is under development.

== Development ==
In the aftermath of the Kargil War, and with the heightened levels of infiltration, the Indian Army started looking at electronic sensors to augment the surveillance capabilities. One of the technologies identified was a small, surveillance radar, and the Army projected its requirements to LRDE shortly after. Sanction was given to DRDO to develop an indigenous radar. In the meantime, some Battle Field Surveillance radars (SR) were imported from Israel at a cost of ₹80 crore, pending completion of the project. This accompanied a large-scale induction of high tech equipment for the Indian Armed Forces.

The radar was designed and developed by LRDE, a DRDO unit, and manufactured by BEL. Initiated in 2000, the development was carried out in LRDE, with the Project Director being Dr. S. Varadarajan, and with BEL collaboration. The project was a systematic example of concurrent engineering, with the production agency involved through the design and development stage. This enabled the design to be brought into production quickly. A salient feature of the BFSR programme was the high level of involvement of the Indian private sector, a first for defence programmes in India. Private firms supplied the rotational assembly and tripod, the Control and display unit as well as electronics assemblies after design and technology transfer by LRDE. This has continued into the substantial production run.

The radar was ready for trials in early 2002, and after extensive trials in Rajasthan and Jammu and Kashmir, it was accepted in July 2002, 24 months after development work commenced.

== Description ==
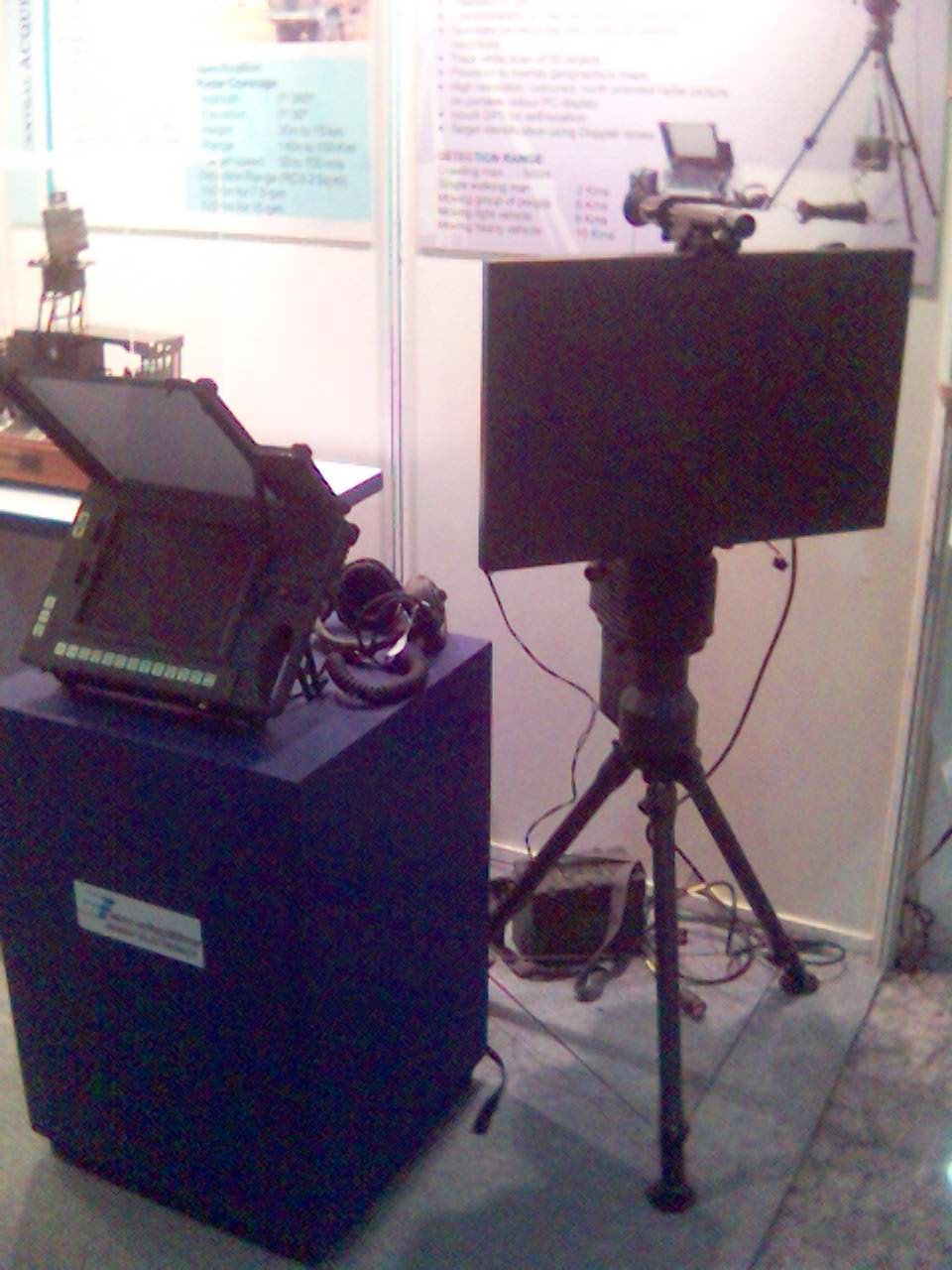
BFSR-SR with the display unit

BFSR is a man portable, lightweight, battery operated, surveillance radar. Weighing around 30 kg, it can be carried and operated by two or three-man teams.

The BFSR is a fully coherent Pulse Doppler radar, operating with a 10% duty cycle, and a 5W peak power. The low peak power provides the radar a low probability of intercept (LPI), making it difficult to detect by enemy sensors. The radar operates over 21 channels in J band (10 to 18/20 GHz). It can be operated in all weather conditions, and during day and night.

BFSR-SR components include a mounting tripod, an antenna/electronics assembly, two 24 V batteries for power, and an integrated control and display unit (CDU). Targets are classified automatically using Doppler target classification, with output Doppler return being channelled to the operator through headphones for the Doppler audio.

The radar operates on two rechargeable 24 V batteries, which are carried separately by the soldiers. They can also be operated from AC supply. The batteries are usually suspended from the tripod to provide extra stability to the radar, although they can be kept separately.

=== Radar array and hardware ===
The radar array consists of J-band Transmit, receive and processing modules within the single array block. The signal processor is a single on-board FPGA-based chip, which has been tailored for very low power consumption. The antenna array is made up of microstrip patch array antennas. The transmitter is a solid state transmit module, while the separate receiver is a super-heterodyne type receiver.

The radar algorithm incorporates Digital Pulse compression Technology, which improves the LPI characteristics, as well as making the radar more accurate. This technology was developed in-house by LRDE, which constituted a major breakthrough for Indian radar technology.

=== Display ===
The BFSR processing and display units, and control functions are integrated on a single, touch-sensitive, portable IBM PC, called the Control and Display Unit (CDU). Some processing elements are also built into the radar. The processed information is displayed on a high resolution 10.4" LCD colour display.

The PC operates on a Windows NT-based, menu-driven user interface, which makes operating the BFSR extremely simple.

A high-resolution, north-oriented, coloured radar picture is displayed on PC display. The radar display can either be in a Plan position indicators (PPI) display, or a B-Scope display. The display also has provision for digital geographic map overlay, which allows the target data to be integrated with tactical data for use by ground forces and commanders. Different geographical maps can be overlaid on the radar display. A target position can be marked for further investigation, or combing of the area by ground forces.

The interface between the radar and the CDU can be either RS232C or LAN connectivity. A lightweight, rugged, standard army 2-wire field cable is used for communicating between the radar and CDU. This allows the operators to be positioned up to 100 m away from the radar, in the safety of trenches, bunkers, or hides. This provides them better security and safety, and allows for greater flexibility in deploying the radar at suitable spots to meet technical and tactical requirements. The use of wired interface also provides a better security from interception and lower noise, and does not require the radar and CDU to be within Line-of-Sight of each other.

=== Networking ===
The BFSR has a COTS- based built in networking and sensor fusion to increase the effectiveness of surveillance. Up to 10 radars may be networked at one time to provide greater area of coverage. All radars in a network can also be remotely controlled from a central hub.

Provision to Network various radars for wider area coverage has also been built into the BFSR.

=== Thermal imager ===
A third generation thermal imager has also been configured for use on the BFSR and has been integrated with it (as shown in the image in the infobox). Operating in the Mid-wavelength Infrared (MWIR) spectrum (3-5 micrometre wavelengths), the imager has a single field of view (monocular sighting) This has given the BFSR day and night viewing capability. All BFSR data and images, both radar as well as thermal data are combined and displayed on the common control and display unit (CDU). Thus, the radar can integrate its display with IR sensor output, which improves the overall efficacy of the system.

The radar continues to progress further in terms of integration with more features being added. To aid in sensor fusion, and increase the effectiveness of surveillance, newer variants are also being networked with the Indian Army's Hand-held Thermal Imagers (HHTIs) for visually tracking targets detected by the radar.

=== Operation ===
The BFSR has been designed for fast deployment, with a setup time of less than 5 minutes. The radar has an inbuilt GPS for self location and alignment with the digital map. It also has a built-in digital magnetic compass which can automatically align the radar to the North. This ensures that the precise location of targets is measured.

==== Modes of operation ====
The radar can be operated in various modes - Surveillance/Scanning ("Search"), acquisition, tracking/classification mode. The radar can also be operated manually, or put into an automated "Standby" mode. BFSR also has integrated calibration and maintenance modes, which aids in easy maintenance and testing on the field. Additionally, the radar also contains a built-in training simulator, which aids in the training of operators without the need to extensive training facilities. Further training modules can be easily loaded on to the PC.

The built-in test equipment (BITE) on the BFSR aids in increasing reliability and allowing for easy calibration and fault detection of the radar on the field.

The various modes are remotely configurable from the CDU by the operator, which allows for different modes of operations without any physical changes on the BFSR, and without needing the operator to expose himself to any danger. The operation can also be remotely controlled for networked radars.

In scanning mode, the radar can scan around a specified sector looking for any moving objects. It is also capable of "Track-while-Scan" (TWS) operation, and can track 50 targets in TWS acquisition mode. The speed of scan can also be adjusted by adjusting the speed of the antenna's rotation to either a low, medium or high rotational speed.

If a target is found, the operator can choose to track that target in the dedicated tracking mode. The Doppler return from the target is then processed, and fed into the operator's headphones to aid in classification. A classification algorithm in the radar also automatically classifies them into crawling target, single moving target, group of men, light vehicle, heavy vehicle and helicopter.

The radar can also be vehicle or mast-mounted, to increase the detection capabilities. For mobility, better range, and for overcoming obstructions and ground reflection, a vehicle mounted version of BFSR has been developed. The radar array is mounted on a 6 meter long telescopic mast on a jeep or truck platform.

== Applications ==
BFSR is designed keeping in mind the requirements of border surveillance and intruder detection. Thus, it is an ideal tool for border surveillance and protection. It can also be used for battlefield surveillance and intelligence gathering by scouts, forward observers and Special Forces units. It can also be used as a low-cost solution for detection of low flying helicopters and boats by smaller infantry units, enabling in better protection in the absence of larger air-defence radars.

The BFSR has been mainly used by the Indian Army for surveillance of designated areas and borders, for the prevention of infiltration and illegal immigration. It can also be used for perimeter surveillance and protection of sensitive sites, industrial facilities, power plants and similar sites.

== Status ==
BFSR-SR is currently being used extensively by the Indian Army, which has employed it in the border areas with Pakistan and Bangladesh for surveillance and prevention of infiltration. In April 2004, 1176 units were ordered by the Indian Army for ₹551 crore (equivalent to ₹20 billion or US$200 million in 2023) and were delivered within 18 months. the Indian Border Security Force has also inducted these radars for border surveillance.

Additional 215 units of upgraded BFSR-SR radars were reportedly ordered in 2023. The upgraded radars were fitted with Thermal Imaging camera. The Request for Proposal (RfP) or the tender was released on 4 April 2023, followed by submission of the technical bid by Bharat Electronics on 24 May 2023 and its opening on 2 June 2023. The contract, after contract negotiations, was signed on 19 June 2023 at a cost of ₹2,987,246,577 (US$31 million). The radars were to be supplied within 12 months,

=== Foreign sales ===
BEL is heavily promoting the BFSR as a major product to foreign customers in order to improve its international defence presence. At ₹40-50 crores per unit, the BFSR costs a third of the price of comparable western systems.

The BFSR has also notched up foreign sales, with Indonesia ordering 100 units and Sudan ordering 10 radars. In fact, Indonesia was the first customer to receive the radars, even before the Indian Army. Mozambique has also bought some radars for trials. BEL is looking at Sri Lanka, Uzbekistan and some other countries for potential sales. There have been serious sales enquiries from at least 5 countries. BEL is in the process of offering the product for field evaluations in other countries.

== Operators ==
India

- Indian Army – 1176 BFSR-SR and 215 upgraded BFSR-SR.
- Border Security Force

Vietnam

- Vietnam People's Ground Forces

=== Exports ===
- Indonesia – ~100 units.
- Sudan – 10 units.
- Mozambique – Bought for trials.

== Specifications ==
=== Performance ===
==== Range ====
- Detection Range:
    - Crawling man: 500 m
    - Walking man: 2 km (1.2 mi)
    - Group of people: 7 km (4.3 mi)
    - Light vehicle: 10 km (6.2 mi)
    - Heavy vehicle: 14 km (8.7 mi)
- Range accuracy: 20m rms
- Range resolution: 50 m
- Speed: 0.9 m/s to 90 km/h

==== Azimuth & elevation ====
- Elevation Coverage: -40 to +15° (remotely settable)
- Azimuth sector scan: 30 to 180°
- Azimuth accuracy: 0.5° rms
- Azimuth resolution: better than 4°
- Track while Scan: 50 targets

=== Technical specifications ===
- Instrumented Range: 18 km (11 mi)
- Frequency Band: J band, 21 frequencies
- Transmitter Type: Solid state
- Receiver Type: Super heterodyne
- Antenna Type: Micro-strip Patch array

=== Operation ===
- Modes of operation: Surveillance and tracking
- Target Identification: Using Doppler tones
- Rotation Rate: Low, Medium, High

=== Display ===
- Control & display unit: Customized, portable, IBM PC, compatible with Windows NT operating system
- Display type: 10.4" LCD colour
- Display modes: PPI or B-scope
- External interface: RS232C, LAN

=== Power & Reliability ===
- Weight: 30 kg (excluding accessories)
- Power supply: 24 V DC nominal
- Power consumption: 80 W
- Operating temperature: -20 to +55 °C
- MTBF: 1500 hrs
- Operational Altitude: Up to 16,000 feet (4,900 m)

== See also ==
- BEL Weapon Locating Radar
- Electronics and Radar Development Establishment
- Man portable radar
- Perimeter Surveillance Radar
