= Divyachakshu Through Barrier Imaging Radar =

Divyachakshu (Divyachakshu: Divine Eye) is a through barrier imaging radar, developed by Electronics and Radar Development Establishment (LRDE), a Bengaluru-based DRDO lab in India. It is capable of scanning through walls, and thereby has an important application in hostage rescue operations.

== Description ==
The device was developed by Electronics and Radar Development Establishment of the DRDO. Its radar is capable of looking through walls and other opaque barriers with up to 20–30 cm thickness. The radar measures heat behind a barrier and produces real time images that reveal human body movement. It thus has applications for the military in hostage rescue operations.

The original version of the device weighs 6–7 kg; however, a lighter version is being also developed.

== Development and Trials ==
The development of the radar began in the wake of the 26/11 Mumbai attacks, with the formal sanction coming in 2010. The device costs ₹35 lakhs, in contrast to the alternatives available elsewhere, which cost at least ₹2 crore. The DRDO plans to offer these to the Indian Army, the BSF, and paramilitary forces as an indigenous alternative to the foreign ones in use with the armed forces. Currently, the radar is undergoing development trials which are expected to conclude by the end of 2016.

== See also ==
- Thermography
- Night vision
- Infrared detector
- Thermographic camera
