= Perimeter surveillance radar =

Perimeter surveillance radar (PSR) is a class of radar sensors that monitor activity surrounding or on critical infrastructure areas such as airports, seaports, military installations, national borders, refineries and other critical industry and the like. Such radars are characterized by their ability to detect movement at ground level of targets such as an individual walking or crawling towards a facility. Such radars typically have ranges of several hundred metres to over 10 kilometres.

Alternate technologies include laser-based systems. These have the potential for very high target position accuracy, however they are less effective in the presence of fog and other obscurants.

== Characteristics ==
PSR's usually have the following required characteristics:

- No operator required: The radar autonomously detects movement in a defined area, tracks those targets and raises an alarm if the targets cross into alarm areas.
- Export of target data: The radar not only has its own dedicated display and alarm system, but also outputs data to other systems that form the security network. A typical interface system today would include target data output over Extensible Markup Language (XML) at a useful target data rate (0.1 Hz to 1 Hz).
- Coverage: a radar that covers more area can be potentially more useful than a radar that covers a limited sector. PSRs cover areas between 80° and 360°.
- Resolution: a radar that operates at higher frequencies and with narrower beams will determine target positions most accurately.
- Low false alarm rates: a radar that puts out false targets is at best an irritant and tactically can confuse the security team. A good PSR should have a designed false alarm rate of two or less false alarms per day. (A false alarm should not be confused with a nuisance alarm caused by, for example, an animal).

Characteristics of some perimeter surveillance radar systems:

- Carrier frequencies range from C-band (about 5 GHz) to W band (about 77 GHz).
- Modulation characteristics include CW, FMCW, and pulsed. FMCW based systems typically have very high range resolution, often better than 1 metre.
- Ranges from 300 meters to over 10 km.
- Detection methods include Doppler (requiring movement relative to the transmitter) and clutter mapping (movement in any direction).
- Area coverage rates: from 1 to 10 updates per second.
- Mechanical Movement: Older PSRs rely on rotating antennas while newer designs rely on Beamforming technology which requires no moving parts. This may dramatically increase the reliability of the PSR while making the PSR more complex by requiring many receive and/or transmit channels.

== Challenges to PSR ==
Perimeter surveillance radars may operate in areas with high clutter levels. In the range of frequencies used almost all objects return some reflection from the radar, as does the ground itself. Foliage presents a particular problem as it is both a barrier to the radar energy, as well as an area in which it is difficult to detect a moving target due to the foliage being blown by the wind appearing as multiple moving targets. To a degree, Doppler based radar can detect movement in such areas, as long as the component of movement velocity towards or away from the radar is significant enough to generate a signal that overcomes the foliage return signal.

Radar does not have enough resolution to identify one person from another, so cannot be used as a substitute for CCTV. Many PSRs directly interface to control daylight or thermal cameras using a "slew to cue" system to overcome this problem. Total automation may be achieved if the camera uses analytics.

== PSR manufacturers ==
Perimeter surveillance radar makers include:

- Advanced Radar Technologies S.A. with ART Midrange high resolution ground surveillance radar
- Blighter Surveillance Systems with the Blighter B202 Mk 2 Man portable radar, Blighter B303 radar and Blighter B402, B422, B432, and B442 radars
- DMT with the AIMS
- Echodyne MESA Technologies Radars with the EchoGuard for 3D Security
- Elta Systems
- EPSI with PSR-200, PSR-500, PSR-SR, PSR-ESW... high resolution low cost radars
- FLIR Systems with the R1, R2, R3, R3D, R5, R5D and R20SS. FLIR RADAR
- K&G Spectrum with SR-0303, SR-3030, SR-4505, and SR-360;
- Kelvin Hughes Security Systems with the SharpEye SxV radar,
- Magos Systems with the SR-250, SR-500 and SR-1000 high resolution ground surveillance radars.
- Micran Surveillance Systems with GUARD Security Surveillance System and MRS series radars;
- Navtech Radar with the HDR100, HDR200 & HDR300 series millimetre-wave radars;
- Ogier Electronics with the Scan-360 low-cost ground surveillance radar.
- SpotterRF with Compact surveillance radar M600, M600C and M80;
- SRC, Inc. with the SR Hawk ground surveillance radar
- RADESCAN Antidron UMIRS, RU
- RADESCAN ground surveillance radar, UMIRS, RU
- Rockwell Collins PSR-500

== See also ==
- Radar
- Surveillance
