= NIRDESH =

Indian research institute

National Institute for Research and Development in Defence Shipbuilding (NIRDESH) is India's first centre for research and development in defence shipbuilding that is being established at Chaliyam near Beypore in the Kozhikode district of Kerala.

Upon full completion in 2016, it is expected to augment India's domestic defence production capabilities and be among Asia's largest centres for research and innovation in surface and submarine defence platforms.

The position of Deputy Director General, based is New Delhi, is held by Commander Dinesh Chandra Agarwal, previously with Manipal University Jaipur. The Project Director, based in Calicut, is Ramesh Babu.

== Location ==
The institute is being set up at Chaliyam which was once renowned for its shipbuilding industry and is close to the site of the landing of Vasco Da Gama in 1498. The institute is coming up in an area of 40.56 acres.

== History ==
The foundation stone for the institute was laid by the Defence Minister, AK Antony on 4 January 2011 and it is the fifth defence undertaking to be established in Kerala during AK Antony's tenure as the Defence Minister. The institute is being set up at a cost of ₹600 crores with the funding coming from the Ministry of Defence and the four defence shipyards at Mazagon Dock Shipbuilders (Mumbai), Garden Reach Shipbuilders & Engineers (Kolkata), Goa Shipyard (Goa) and Hindustan Shipyard (Visakhapatnam) and will operate as an autonomous institution under the Department of Defence Production.

Following the laying of the foundation stone the project encountered severe time overruns owing to delays in floating tenders and agitations by local people. While the initial phase of its construction was to have been completed in 2 years, little had been achieved in the 18 months following the stone-laying ceremony after local people organised and prevented the construction of a compound wall at the site. The Government of Kerala announced a comprehensive rehabilitation package for people affected by the project including provisions for their housing, education and health.

In March 2013, the Board of Governors of NIRDESH met at New Delhi and announced that the institute would become operational in June 2013.

As of June 2025, the institute is considered as "near-defunct". Reportedly, the last Deputy Director General attedned the institute for only 10 days out of his five and a half year-long tenure. Earlier, in 2017, the Finance Ministry also rejected a ₹200 crore (equivalent to ₹306 crore or US$32 million in 2026) worth revival project for the establishment. NIRDESH was restructured "as a society" with the DPSU shipyards as its "members" and the CMD of MDL as its "chairman and president".

== Objectives ==
NIRDESH seeks to facilitate enhanced self-reliance in India's defence production capabilities by focusing on areas like detail designing and integration of systems through a multipronged approach that includes development of skills, the involvement of defence industry and the strategy of knowledge mining. NIRDESH aims to develop an inventory of almost 15,000 inputs needed in the construction of warships including around 3750 key and strategic products.

NIRDESH aims to provide technological support, develop indigenous capabilities and promote the participation of ancillary industries in India's defence shipbuilding sector thus enabling them to meet future demands for platforms by the Indian Navy. Ultimately, NIRDESH is to become the nodal centre for the defence shipbuilding industry in India.

NIRDESH will undertake research studies, conduct detailed investigations and develop prototypes depending on the requirements of the country and collaborate to this end with domestic and foreign agencies. The institute will pioneer the acquisition of intellectual property rights and register and share patents on systems and designs in ship and submarine-building with shipyards. Consultancy services to shipyards in areas of space and project planning, human resources and best practices will form another area of activity.

== Facilities and work ==
NIRDESH is expected to engage over 10,000 people including a large number of researchers and create over 5,000 ancillary jobs in Kozhikode district. Phase-I of the project, to be completed by 2016, will establish facilities for a Design and Data Park, a Training and Academic Park, an Estate and Environment Park and provide administrative facilities and other amenities. A Research and Development park and a Technology and Innovation park will come up later. The land for the campus was made available by the Government of Kerala and the construction of the buildings are being undertaken by the state government agency Nirmithi Kendra. In 2013 NIRDESH commenced the Young Officers Capsule Course as its pioneer training programme. It has also begun its first R&D project for the indigenisation of silicon rubber in association with the Rubber Research Institute of India, Kottayam.
