= Electronics and Radar Development Establishment =

Indian defence research laboratory

Electronics & Radar Development Establishment
- Established: 1962
- Field of research: Radar Systems
- Director: Shri. P Radhakrishna
- Location: DRDO Complex, C.V. Raman Nagar, Bengaluru-560 093, Bengaluru, Karnataka, India
- Operating agency: DRDO
- Website: LRDE

Electronics and Radar Development Establishment (LRDE) is a laboratory of the Defence Research & Development Organisation (DRDO), India. Located in C.V. Raman Nagar, Bengaluru, Karnataka, its primary function is research and development of radars and related technologies. It was founded by S. P. Chakravarti, the father of electronics and telecommunication engineering in India, who also founded the Defence Electronics Research Laboratory and Defence Research and Development Laboratory.

LRDE is sometimes misabbreviated as "ERDE". The distinction uses the first letter from the Greek root elektron which is also applied in other DRDO abbreviations. The same approach is used with for the DLRL. The LRDE is India's premier radar design and development establishment and plays a key role in national radar programs. Its primary production partners include Bharat Electronics Limited (BEL) and various private firms like CoreEL Technologies, Bangalore, Mistral Solutions in Bengaluru, Astra microwave in Hyderabad and Data Patterns in Chennai.

== Projects ==
=== LRDE Radars ===
The DRDO's initial projects included short range 2D systems (Indra-1), and LRDE now develops high-power 3D radars, airborne surveillance radars, and fire control systems. The publicly known projects include:

- INDRA series of 2D radars meant for the Army and the Air Force use. This was the first high power radar developed by the DRDO, with the Indra-I radar for the Indian Army, followed by Indra Pulse Compression (PC) version for the Indian Air Force, also known as the Indra-II, which is a low level radar to search and track low flying cruise missiles, helicopters and aircraft. These are basically 2D radars which provide range, and azimuth information, and are meant to be used as gapfillers. The Indra 2 PC has pulse compression providing improved range resolution. The series are used both by the Indian Air Force and the Indian Army
- Rajendra fire control radar for the Akash SAM: The Rajendra is a high power, passive electronically scanned array radar (PESA), with the ability able to guide up to 12 Akash SAMs against aircraft flying at low to medium altitudes. The Rajendra has a detection range of 80 km with 18 km height coverage against small fighter sized targets and is able to track 64 targets, engaging 4 simultaneously, with up to 3 missiles per target. The Rajendra features a digital high speed signal processing system with adaptive moving target indicator, coherent signal processing, FFTs, and variable pulse repetition frequency. The entire PESA antenna array can swivel 360 degrees on a rotating platform. This allows the radar antenna to be rapidly repositioned, and even conduct all round surveillance.
- Central Acquisition Radar, a state of the art planar array, S Band radar operating on the stacked beam principle. With a range of 180 km against fighter sized targets, it can track while scan 200 of them. Its systems are integrated on high mobility, locally built TATRA trucks for the Army and the Air Force; however it is meant to be used by all three services. Initially developed for the long-running Akash SAM system, seven were ordered by the Indian Air Force for their radar modernisation program, and two of another variant were ordered by the Indian Navy for their P-28 Corvettes. The CAR has been a significant success for radar development in India, with its state of the art signal processing hardware.
- BFSR-SR: 2D short range Battle Field Surveillance Radar, meant to be man-portable. Designed and developed by the LRDE, the project was a systematic example of concurrent engineering, with the production agency involved through the design and development stage. This enabled the design to be brought into production quickly.
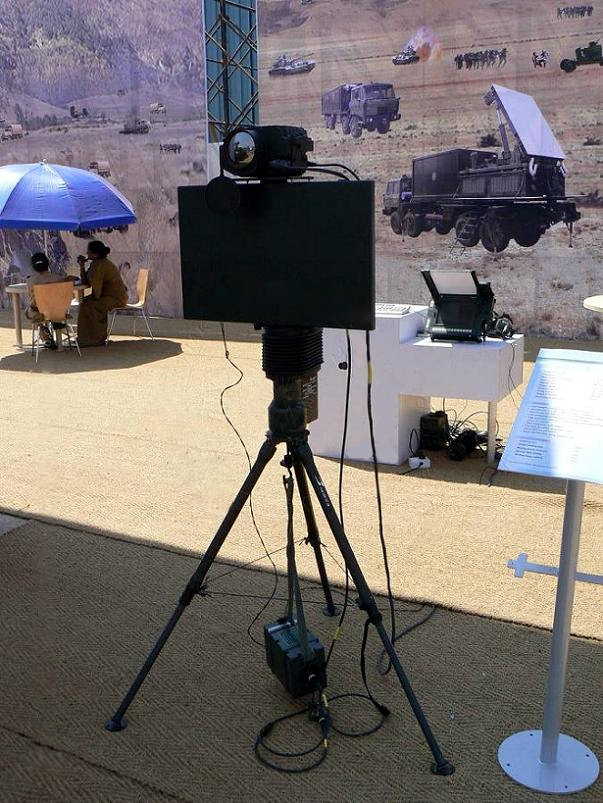
  BFSR-SR
- Long Range Tracking Radar: The LRTR a 3D AESA was developed with assistance from Elta of Israel, and is similar to Elta's GreenPine long range Active Array radar. The DRDO developed the signal processing and software for tracking high speed ballistic missile targets as well as introduced more ruggedisation. The radar uses mostly Indian designed and manufactured components such as its critical high power, L Band Transmit-Receive modules plus the other enabling technologies necessary for active phased array radars. The LRTR can track 200 targets and had a range of above 600 kilometres (370 mi) and can detect Intermediate Range Ballistic Missiles. The LRTR would be amongst the key elements of the Indian ABM system.
- 2D Low Level Lightweight Radar (LLLR) "Bharani" for the Army. The LLLR is a 2D radar with a range of 40 km against a 2$m^2$ target, intended as a gapfiller to plug detection gaps versus low level aircraft in an integrated Air Defence Ground network. The LLLR makes use of Indra-2 technology, namely a similar antenna array, but has roughly half the range and is much smaller and a far more portable unit. The LLLR can track while scan 100 targets and provide details about their speed, azimuth and range to the operator. The LLLR makes use of the BFSR-SR experience and many of the subsystem providers are the same. Multiple LLLRs can be networked together. The LLLR is meant to detect low level intruders, and will alert Army Air Defence fire control units to cue their weapon systems.
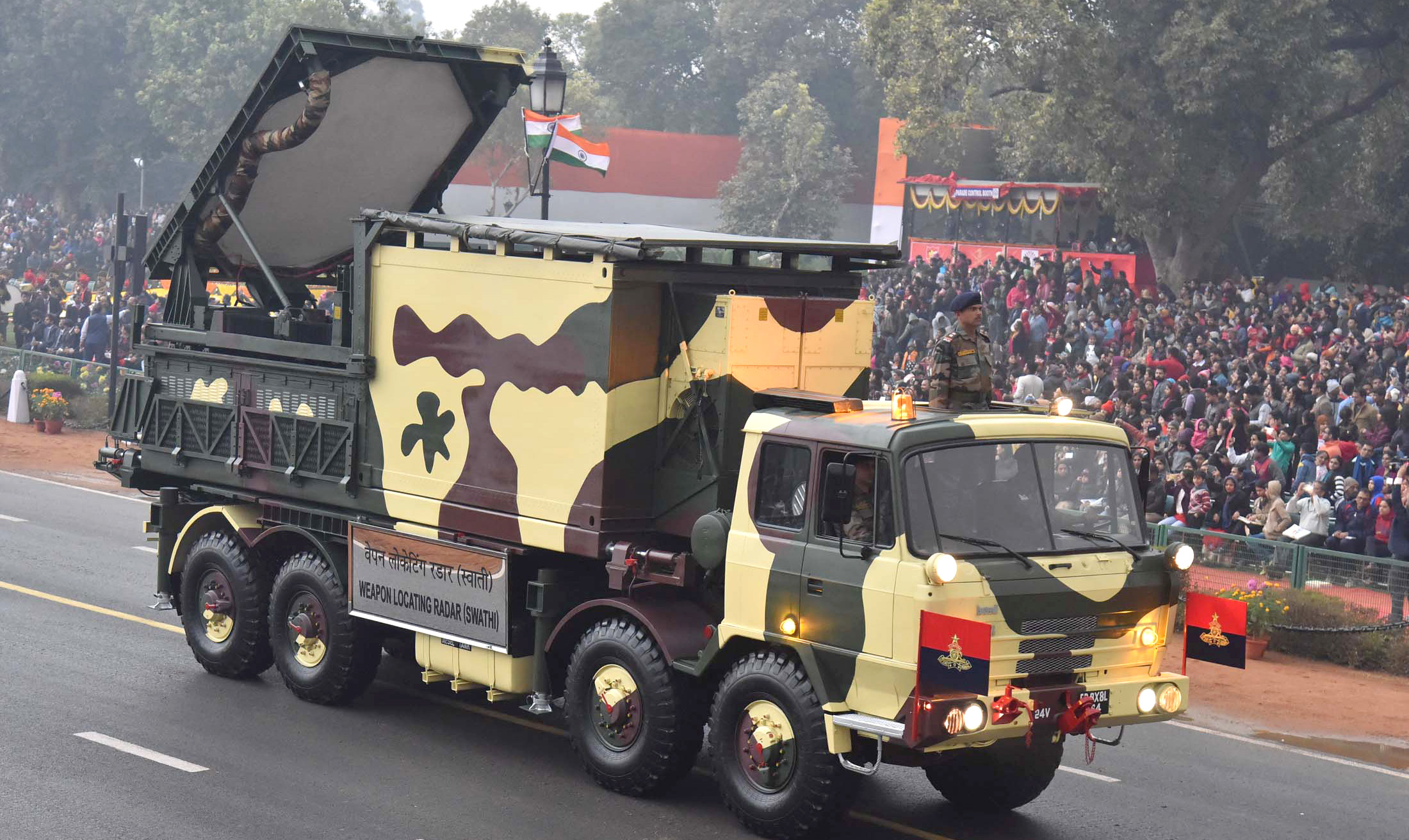
- Swathi WLR in Republic Day parade.
  Swathi WLR: A 3D radar developed from the Rajendra fire control radar for the Akash system, this radar uses a passive electronically scanned array to detect multiple targets for fire correction and weapon location. The system has been developed and demonstrated to the Army and orders have been placed
- Netra AEW&C: The AEWACS aircraft has an active electronically scanned array (AESA) primary radar with IFF. The system will also have ESM (Electronic Support Measures) and CSM (Communications Support Measures) ability. Datalinks to network the AEW&CS with fighters, and ground-based control systems will also be provided, as will be the SATCOM (Satellite Communication System). The aircraft will also have a comprehensive self-defence suite. The avionics suite will be linked via a datahandling system, controlled by Mission computers.
- Air Defence Tactical Control Radar (ADTCR): 3D AESA radar. It is developed by Electronics and Radar Development Establishment (LRDE), a laboratory of the DRDO which is being developed for Indian Army. Air Defence Tactical Control Radar (ADTCR) is used for volumetric surveillance, detection, tracking and friend/foe identification of aerial targets of different types, and transmission of prioritised target data to multiple command posts/ weapon systems. The radar is capable of detecting very small targets and low flying targets. It is capable of tracking 100 aerial targets at a time. It has a range of 500 km (maximum).
- Divine Eye/Divyachakshu: A through-barrier imaging radar capable of detecting movement through walls.

Apart from the above, the DRDO has also several other radar systems currently under development or in trials. The systems on which publicly available information is available include:

- Uttam AESA is an indigenously developed active electronically scanned array (AESA) fire control radar. It is being developed for the Tejas Mk2 and Mk1 and also other aircraft upgrades such as the IAF's Sukhoi Su-30MKI, MiG-29 and MiG-29Ks. Hardware has already been realised for this radar which has a range of 100 km against small fighter sized targets and rooftop testing is underway. Though the Uttam AESA currently weighs 120 kg which is some 40 kg more than the current MMR, there will be no problem in integrating it with the LCA Mk-II which can easily carry a radar of this weight. It is a 3D radar for fighters, a MMR follow on, the APAR project aims to field a fully fledged operational AESA fire control radar for the expected Mark-2 version of the Light Combat Aircraft. This will be the second airborne AESA program after the AEW&C project and intends to transfer the success the DRDO has achieved in the ground-based radar segment to airborne systems. The overall airborne APAR program aims to prevent this technology gap from developing, with a broad based program to bring DRDO up to par with international developers in airborne systems: both fire control and surveillance.
- According to a WION report dated 30 June 2025, LRDE has successfully developed India's first photonic radar and is preparing for testing.

=== Anti-drone warfare ===
==== D-4 System (D4S) ====
LRDE as part of anti-drone warfare developed D-4 which uses data fusion coming from multiple sensors for drone detection and is equipped with dual countermeasure techniques. D-4 has a 360° radar coverage for detecting micro drones within a range of 4 km (2.5 mi), a radio frequency detector to check RF communications in 3 km (1.9 mi) range and an electro-optical and infrared sensor for visual identification within 2 km (1.2 mi) range. The RF and EO/IR sensor works in tandem for confirmation and verification of the target. This activates the first stage of countermeasure through RF/GNSS jammer to counter the incoming communication signals. It is part of the soft-kill framework. For second stage of countermeasure, D-4 comes equipped with a 4-kilowatt laser of range 150 m to 1 km (0.62 mi) which goes for the hard-kill. D-4 already demonstrated its capabilities to National Security Guard and Indian Air Force in 2020–21. It was first deployed during 2020 and again on 2021 Republic Day around New Delhi. For 15 August celebration in 2021, D-4 system was deployed as part of counter drone strategy around Red Fort.

DRDO has transferred the technology to Bharat Electronics Limited for mass production and is now considering it for private sector industries. On 31 August 2021, Indian Armed Forces signed deal with BEL to acquire static and road mobile D4S to enhance anti-drone capabilities. The commercial sector has already begun producing D4S, and it has been effectively used in military operations, such as Operation Sindoor.

The 4x4 vehicle-mounted Mark 2 type has a 10-kilowatt laser beam that can hit hostile drones up to 2 km (1.2 mi) away. It incorporates RF/GNSS spoofing, an X-band radar with 360° coverage, and EO/IR sensors that can identify drones at a distance of 5–8 km (3.1–5.0 mi). It will be manufactured by Larsen & Toubro. The Indian Army and Indian Air Force plan to induct sixteen units of the Mark 2 variant.

== Products ==
- Rajendra Radar
- Central Acquisition Radar (3D-CAR) - 3D radar for Akash missile
- Indra series
- BEL Battle Field Surveillance Radar (Short Range)
- BEL Weapon Locating Radar
- Air Defence Tactical Control Radar (ADTCR) - AESA radar
- Divyachakshu Through Barrier Imaging Radar
