= Swordfish Long Range Tracking Radar =

Indian OTH radar

Swordfish
- Country of origin: India
- Manufacturer: Bharat Electronics Limited
- Designer: Electronics and Radar Development Establishment
- Introduced: 2009
- Type: Transportable multi-mode solid state active electronically scanned array
- Frequency: L Band
- Range: 600 km (370 mi) to 800 km (500 mi). Upgraded to 1,500 km (930 mi)
- Power: Classified

Swordfish is an Indian active electronically scanned array long-range tracking radar specifically developed to counter ballistic missile threat. It will be a part of the Indian Ballistic Missile Defense Programme. First testing of this radar was in March 2009. Main aim of the test was to validate the capabilities of the Swordfish Long Range Tracking Radar (LRTR). "The missile to be hit will be fired from a longer distance than it was in the earlier test. DRDO tested whether the radar could track the incoming missile from that distance or not," said a member of the project. This radar is an acknowledged derivative of the Israeli EL/M-2080 Green Pine long range radar, which is the critical component of that country's Arrow missile defense system. However, it differs from the Israeli system as it employs Indian Transmit Receive modules, signal processing, computers and power supplies. It is also more powerful than the base Green Pine system and was developed to meet India's specific BMD needs.

== Development ==
Indian Armed Forces acquired two Green Pine long range base variant radar from Israel in July 2002 and August 2005 since USA vetoed the complete sale of Arrow 2 missile defense system in 1999 due to violation of Missile Technology Control Regime (MTCR) which India at that time was not a participating member state. From March 2009, DRDO started validation trials for its own long-range capabilities of Swordfish radar. More tests were conducted in 2009 to enhance the capabilities of Advanced Air Defence endo-atmospheric missile to intercept incoming missiles at altitudes up to 15 km. If no issues crop up, then the tentative date for deployment is 2015. As of January 2019, Swordfish was able to detect over 10 successful missile interceptions that includes two exo-atmospheric hit-to-kill missions.

=== Super Swordfish ===
A new upgraded 1,500 km range Super Swordfish Long Range Tracking Radar or LRTR-II was developed since 2011 by the Electronics and Radar Development Establishment in view of multiple independently targetable reentry vehicle development taking place in China and Pakistan.

Indian Space Research Organisation is already using an L band AESA radar called Multi Object Tracking Radar which is based on the same technology with fixed horizontal and vertical angle rotating at 360°. It is capable of tracking 0.25 m² object at 1,000 km and 0.09 m² at 800 km of Low Earth Orbit (LEO). Astra Microwave developed the antenna, transmit and receive (T/R) module and DC-to-DC converter. NS Engineering created the cooling system and mechanical structure. Cape Electronics developed the power distribution system.

As per Ministry of Defence, the system is operational and deployed as per Ballistic Missile Defence of Delhi NCR. A minimum of two units of LRTR-II were tested in real-world conditions. The radar will be also deployed in Eastern Sector.

=== VLRTR ===
The LRTR series of radars has been succeeded by the VLRTR. The VLRTR, or Very Long Range Tracking Radar, has a range exceeding 3,000 km. The GaN-based TRMs may be used by Very Long Range Tracking Radar.

To support ballistic missile defence, the Missile Monitoring System uses VLRTR to identify space-borne threats. As per MoD, two units of VLRTR systems were accorded by the Union Government under memorandum of understanding between National Technical Research Organisation and Indian Air Force to implement a Missile Monitoring System to identify space-borne threats under Indian Ballistic Missile Defence Programme. First unit was raised in 2017 and the system is operational.

== Service history ==
As of January 2019, Swordfish LRTR was able to perform more than 10 missile interceptions, including two exo-atmospheric hit-to-kill missions.

== Capabilities ==
- Target acquisition and fire control radar for the BMD system.
- Can Guide Exo-atmospheric interceptor missile PAD to hit its target in space at an altitude over 80 km from earth.
- It can detect and track 200 targets simultaneously travelling at a speed of over Mach 12.
- The Swordfish LRTR currently has a range of 600 km (370 mi)-800 km (500 mi) km range and can spot objects as small as a cricket ball (3-inches in diameter), which the DRDO is in the process of upgrading it to 1,500 km as of 2012. These may end up as entirely new designs as well.

== Operators ==
- Indian Air Force
- National Technical Research Organisation
