= Indian Doppler Radar =

Mobile surveillance radar

Low Flying Detection Radar
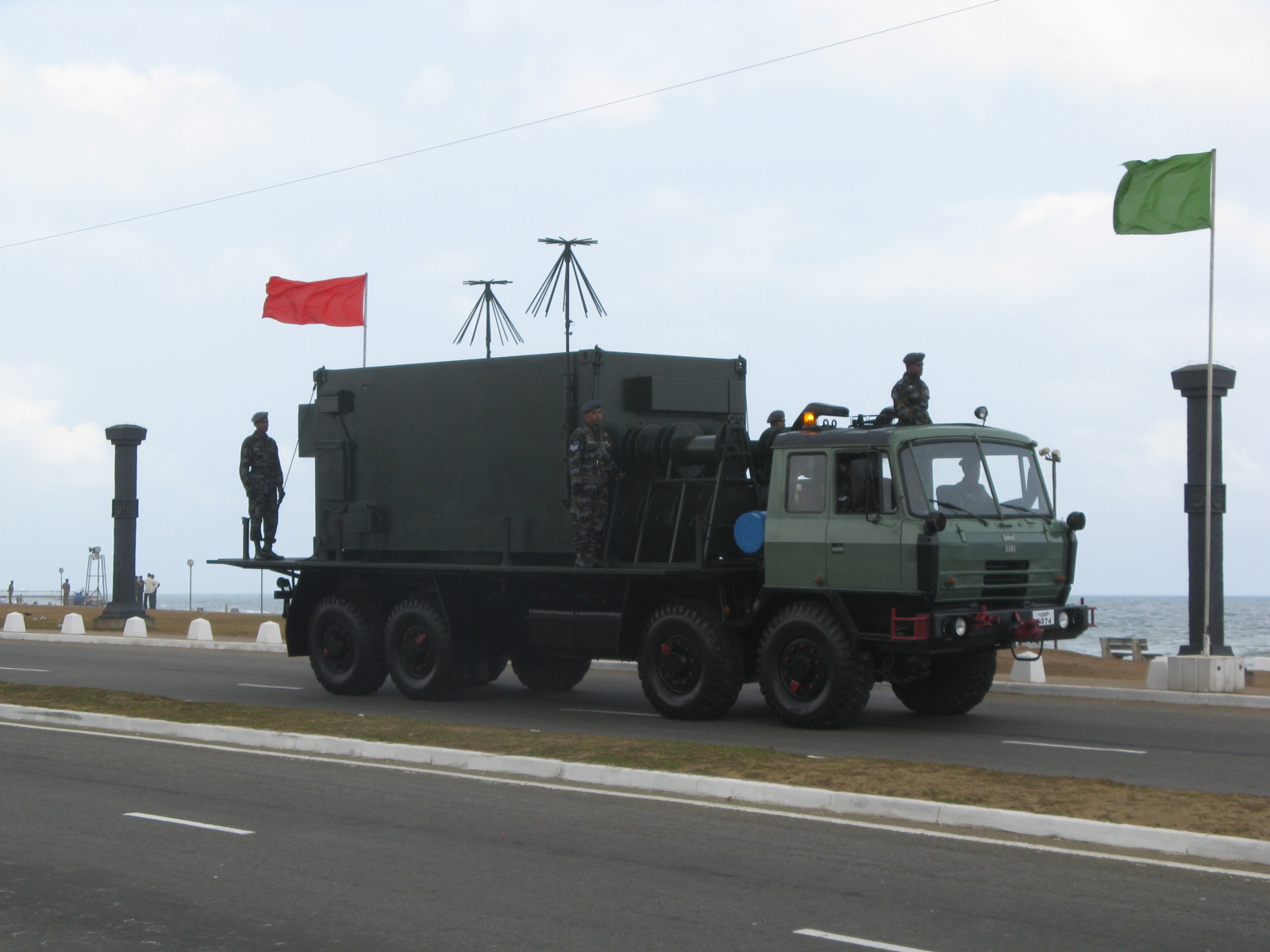
- INDRA-I of Sri Lanka Air Force
- Country of origin: India
- Manufacturer: Bharat Electronics Limited
- Designer: Electronics and Radar Development Establishment (DRDO)
- Type: Secondary surveillance radar
- Frequency: L band
- Other names: INDRA

The Low Flying Detection Radar also called Indian Doppler Radar (INDRA) series of 2D radars were developed by Electronics and Radar Development Establishment (LRDE), of the Defence Research and Development Organisation (DRDO) for the Army and the Air Force. These were then produced by the Bharat Electronics which generally the production partner of LRDE. The INDRA-I is a mobile surveillance radar for low level target detection while the INDRA-II is for ground controlled interception of targets.

== INDRA-I ==
INDRA-I is a 2D mobile surveillance radar for low level target detection. The radar is housed in two wheeled vehicles. Some of the main features are automated track-while-scan (TWS), integrated IFF and high scan rate for high speed target detection. The radar is produced by Bharat Electronics Limited and inducted into service. The INDRA-I was a landmark project for the DRDO, as it was the first large radar system designed by the organization and produced in number for the defence forces. The Indian Air Force operates thirty INDRA-I's whereas the Indian Army also has several.

== INDRA-II ==
It is a variant of INDRA radar for ground controlled interception of targets. The radar uses pulse compression for detection of low flying aircraft in heavy ground clutter with high range resolution and ECCM capabilities. The radar has been produced by Bharat Electronics Limited and is used by Indian Air Force and Army. Seven INDRA-IIs have been ordered by the Indian Air Force.

== Features ==
- Fully coherent system
- Frequency agility
- Pulse compression
- Advanced signal processing using MTD and CFAR Techniques
- Track while scan for 2-D tracking
- Full tracking capabilities for maneuvering targets
- Multicolour PPI Raster Scan Display, presenting both MTI and Synthetic Video
- Integral Identification Friend or Foe (IFF)
- Ease of transportation and fast deployment

=== System characteristics ===
- Range up to 90 km (for a F16 Type Fighter Aircraft).
- Height coverage 35 m to 3000 m subject to radar horizon.
- Probability of detection : 90% (Single scan).
- Probability of false alarm: 10E-6.
- Track While Scan (TWS) for 2D tracking.
- Capability to handle 200 tracks.
- Association of primary and secondary targets.
- Automatic target data transmission to a digital modem/networking of radars.
- Deployment time of about 60 minutes.

== Current status ==
Indian Doppler Radars are in production at Bharat Electronics Limited (BEL) and are being used by the Indian Armed Forces. A few systems have been exported to Sri Lanka and have been used to detect planes of the LTTE's air wing.

== Operators ==
Operators of Indian Doppler Radar
Operating Agency	Country
Indian Army	India
Indian Air Force	India
Sri Lanka Air Force	Sri Lanka
