= Man-portable radar =

Lightweight surveillance radar system

Man-portable radar is a lightweight surveillance radar system that does not require vehicle support to transport or operate. Man-portable radars were developed to introduce radar to remote areas where vehicle support is not feasible.

== Examples ==
=== Ground Observer 12 "BAT" ===
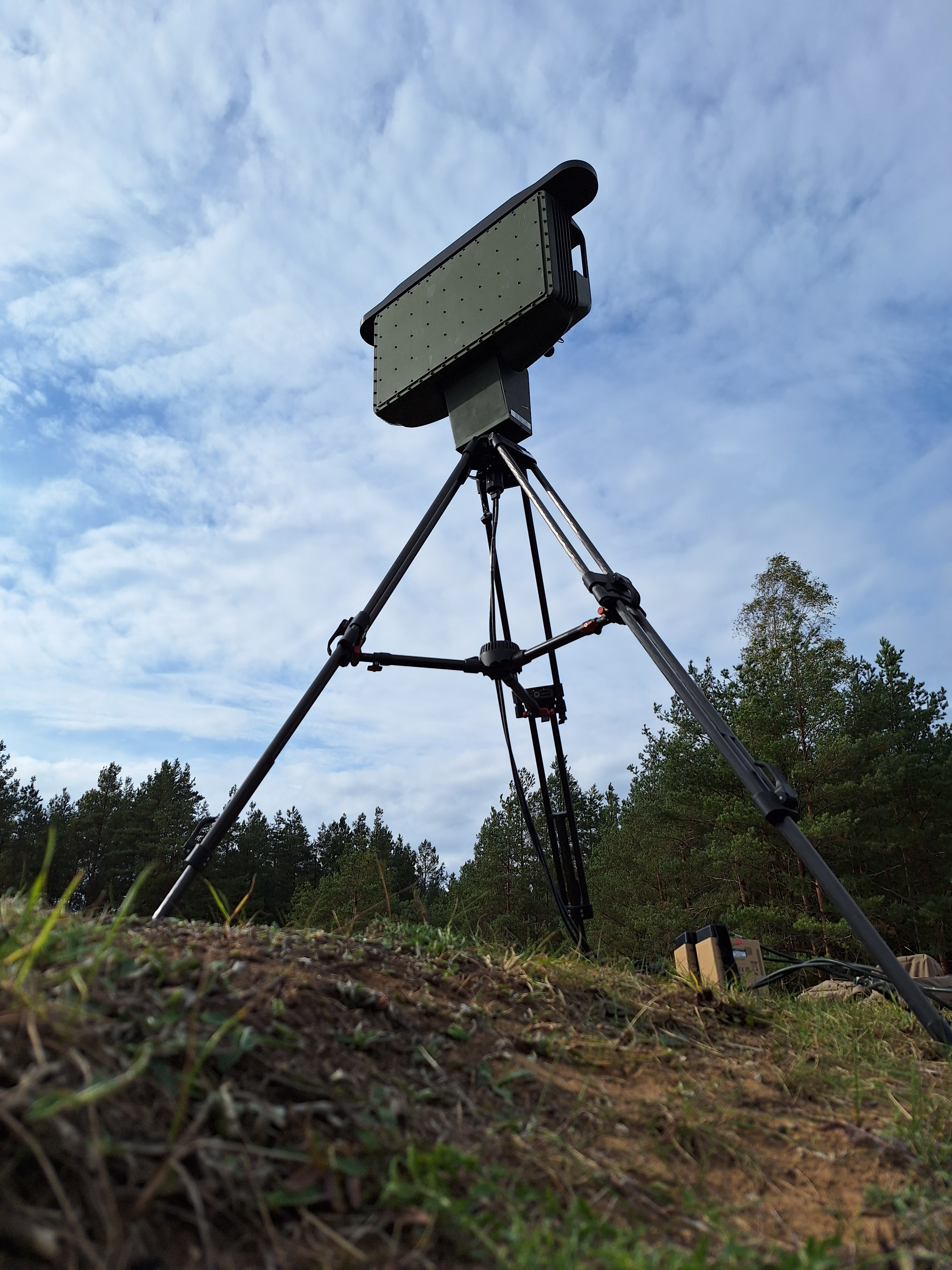
Ground Observer 12 - Ground Combat Radar

The Ground Observer 12 (GO 12) is a medium-range pulse-doppler radar for ground and near ground surveillance with a detection range of up to 27 km. The system is made by Thales in Ditzingen, Germany. The main component, the sensor unit, only weighs 17 kg with a volume of only 28 L, which makes it a highly mobile and extremely compact system with a total weight of appr. 30 kg. The low power demand of only 70W fully supports the idea of a man-pack concept as e.g. > 24 h continuous operation can be ensured with less than 11 kg of batteries.

The GO 12 uses mechanical scan technology with a continuous coverage of an angle of > 360°. Its capability to use a wide range of channels for frequency hopping provides the operators with an effective option against enemy electronic intelligence and jamming.

The GO 12 was introduced to the French Defense Forces under the name "Murin" (bat) in 2019 and immediately sent into combat to the Sahel region, where it performed stunningly well. It was certified to be air-dropped by the French military and thus is in use e.g. with the French 35th Airborne Artillery Regiment for target acquisition and artillery fire adjustment purposes in remote areas. Moreover, the Armed Forces of Ukraine (AFU) have received a total number of 123 GO12 ground surveillance radars from 08/2022 - until 02/2025 financed by the German military aid program. Training for the Ukraine military operators was conducted in Germany and was supported by members of the German army. The outstanding performance of GO12 has led to an enormous demand for these highly mobile radar kits, which has resulted in a production ramp up with Thales Germany. In 2027 the company is planning to produce 500 radars, which is more than 6 times as many than in 2024 (80 pieces produced).

By the end of 2025 more than 500 Ground Observer 12 radars were in operation in 20 countries and on 6 continents.

=== PPE PGSR-3i ‘Beagle’ ===
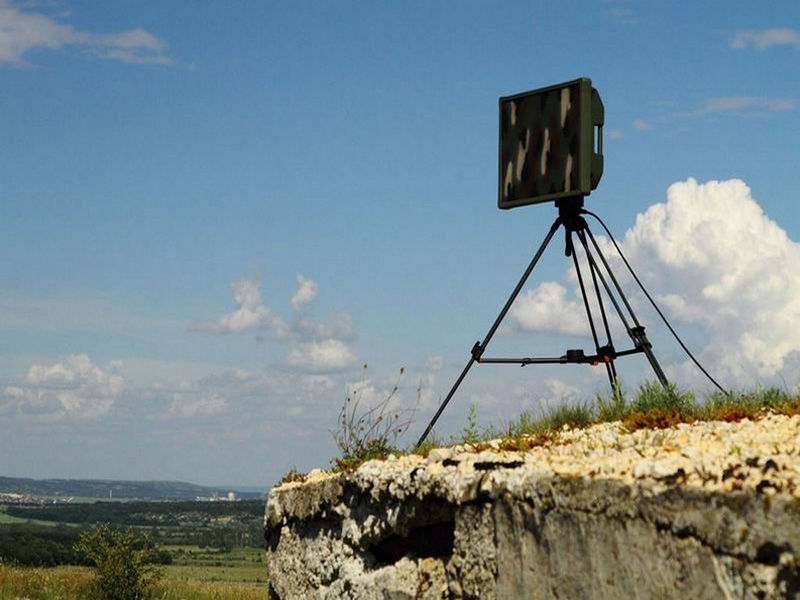
Picture of the PPE PGSR3i Beagle radar

The PPE PGSR-3i ‘Beagle’ is a unique man-portable radar designed and produced by Pro Patria Electronics in Hungary. The system is transported in two backpacks with a weight of 25 kg each. It is capable of intercepting, detecting and tracking targets moving on or close to the ground. It can also classify and differentiate targets based on their size and movement characteristics.

The PPE PGSR-3i ‘Beagle’ can operate on standard Bren Tronics military batteries as well as from a vehicle or mains power source.

The PPE PGSR-3i ‘Beagle’ can scan from 11 to 360 degrees with a continuous 360-degree scanning.

The PPE PGSR-3i ‘Beagle’ has automatic and manual doppler audio mode, artillery correction mode, continuous 360-degree scanning mode. The Beagle has detection ranges of 40 km for very large vehicles, 25 km for vehicles, and 10 km for pedestrians. It has an 5-minute setup time; it can be deployed very quickly. It works with FMCW radar technology, so it has a very low probability of intercept. It has its DSP integrated, so it can even be used with a suitable ruggedized tablet. With a rather large sensor volume of 58 L it is less man-portable than other comparable radars.

=== Blighter B202 Mk 2 (legacy product) ===
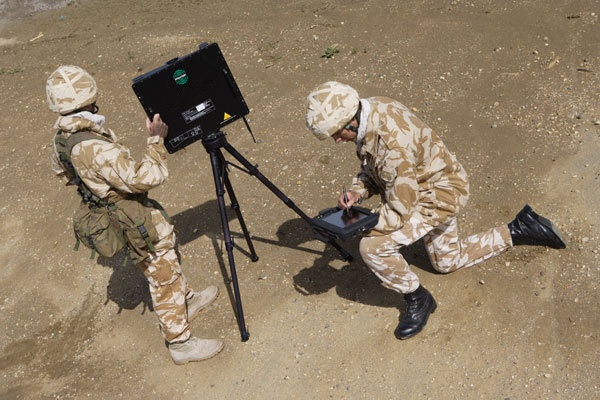

The Blighter B202 Mk 2 radar from Blighter Surveillance Systems (a Plextek Group company) is an advanced short range E-Scan radar with no moving parts for high reliability in the field. The sensor unit weighs about 16 kg and is therefore man portable.

Blighter B202 Mk 2 can operate off small batteries, unlike others in its class which are really vehicle bounded. Blighter B202 Mk 2 is phase coherent and has very low probability of intercept due to its very low peak power.

Blighter B202 Mk 2 also includes high-quality Doppler audio and is a "Multi-Mode and Multi-Role" radar. The modes including radar modes for quick scan ('Vortex Fast-Scan') with audio for fast search and long dwell modes small scan for high probability of detection of crawlers also can be used with Doppler audio for target recognition. Most suited to covert ops and border surveillance as multiple Blighter radars can coordinate in ad hoc networks and sequence their radar emissions to form border surveillance over very long lines of control ('Blighter MultiWatch'). However, it maximum range is only 8 km.

=== MSTAR ===
Man-portable Surveillance and Target Acquisition Radar (MSTAR) provides long-range, wide-area surveillance and detection in an over-watch capability. The weight is about 30 kg.

=== Spotter Global ===
Spotter Global (formerly known as Spotter RF) Compact Surveillance Radars (CSRs) are a new class of surveillance radar. These ultra-light CSRs provide range and azimuth measurements of moving objects and operate reliably in any low-light or obscuring weather conditions.

For the purposes of mobile military operations, Spotter Global CSRs are included in the Tactical Radar Kits (TRKs) advertised on their website. These manpackable radars kits come complete with one small, lightweight radar unit that can detect and track people and vehicles from 500 to 1500 meters away as well as a mounting tripod, backpack, connection cables, Panasonic toughpad, and power source (a small 6-hour battery rechargeable through solar, vehicle, or mains power). The entire TRK, backpack and all, typically weighs in at about 16.5 lbs (7.5 kg). According to Spotter Global's marketing material, it only takes about 30–60 minutes to train personnel on how to set up and operate a TRK.

Spotter Global systems can also integrate with programs such as Exacqvision, Milestone, VideoNext, RaptorX, and Google Earth for an effective and easy visual experience. Combined with Spotter Global's Command and Control (C2) system, NetworkedIO (NIO), radar surveillance systems can actively cue PTZ cameras to moving targets spotted by the system for visual confirmation. The NIO also applies AI behaviorial filters to data allowing it automatically classify targets and differentiate between true threats and nuisance alarms (i.e. alarming on any humans approaching whether they are walking or crawling, but filtering out non-threat targets such as grazing deer). Spotter Global's NIO also allows for the creation of customized alarm zones and integration with auto-triggered deterrence measures (i.e. floodlights, sirens, loudspeakers, hyperspikes, etc.).
