= HAL Tejas =

Indian combat aircraft

Tejas
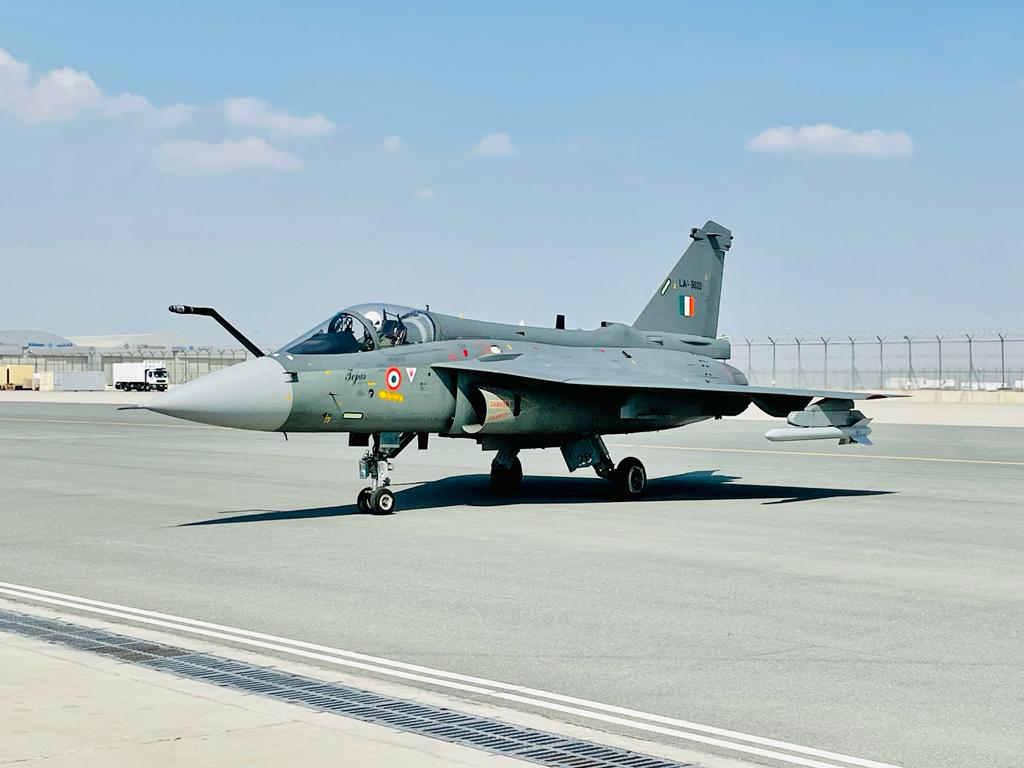
- HAL Tejas from No. 18 Squadron IAF

General information
- Type: Multirole light fighter
- National origin: India
- Manufacturer: Hindustan Aeronautics Limited
- Designer: Aeronautical Development Agency; Aircraft Research and Design Centre (HAL)
- Status: In service
- Primary user: Indian Air Force
- Number built: 84 (Note: 40 Tejas Mk 1 (32 single seat, 8 trainers), 27 Tejas Mk1A single seat) (incl. 17 prototypes) (Note: 9 Prototypes (6 PV, 3 Naval), 8 LSP)

History
- Manufactured: 2001–present
- Introduction date: 17 January 2015
- First flight: 4 January 2001
- Developed into: HAL Tejas Mk2; HAL TEDBF

The HAL Tejas (lit. 'Radiant') is an Indian single-engine, 4.5 generation, delta wing, multirole combat aircraft designed by the Aeronautical Development Agency and manufactured by Hindustan Aeronautics Limited (HAL) for the Indian Air Force (IAF) and the Indian Navy. The aircraft made its first flight in 2001 and entered into service with the IAF in 2015. It is the smallest and lightest of the supersonic fighter jets of its generation.

The aircraft was officially named as Tejas in 2003. The name means 'radiance' or 'brilliance' in Sanskrit, and continued an Indian tradition of choosing Sanskrit-language names for both domestically produced and imported combat aircraft.

Tejas is the second jet powered combat aircraft developed by HAL, after the HF-24 Marut. It has two production combat variants – Mark 1 and Mark 1A apart from trainers. In 2016, the Mark 1 aircraft had an indigenous content of 59.7% by value and 75.5% by the number of line replaceable units, which was increased in the 1A variant.

As of November 2025, the IAF has about 30 Mark 1 aircraft and six trainers in its inventory across two squadrons. The first squadron, No. 45 Squadron IAF (Flying Daggers) became operational in 2016 and is based at Sulur in the southern state of Tamil Nadu. The second squadron, No. 18 Squadron IAF (Flying Bullets) is based at Naliya in Gujarat in Western India. The IAF has 141 combat aircraft of the Mark 1A type on order, in addition to 41 trainers. The IAF plans to procure at least 324 aircraft or 18 squadrons of Tejas in all variants, including the heavier Tejas Mark 2 which is currently being developed.

== Development ==
=== LCA programme ===
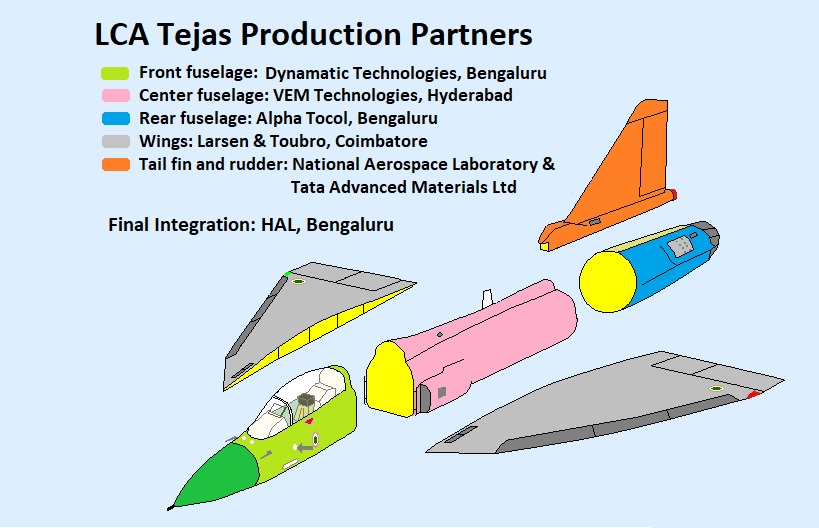
LCA Tejas production partners

In the 1980s, the Indian Air Force (IAF) had been operating ageing fighter aircraft such as the MiG-21. The MiG-21 had been the mainstay of the IAF since 1963, and the IAF had operated 874 of these aircraft in the past. The Long Term Re-Equipment Plan of 1981 of the Ministry of Defence noted that most of these fighter aircraft were approaching the end of their service lives by the early-1990s, and that by 1995, the IAF would be 40 percent short of the aircraft needed to fill its projected force structure requirements.

In 1983, the Government of India established the Light Combat Aircraft (LCA) programme with the initial goal of developing a new light combat aircraft to replace the ageing fleet of the IAF. In 1984, the government established the Aeronautical Development Agency (ADA) under the aegis of the Defence Research and Development Organisation (DRDO) to manage the LCA programme. The ADA was entrusted with the design and development of LCA while Hindustan Aeronautics Limited (HAL) was chosen as the principal contractor. The government's requirements for the aircraft included the following: fly-by-wire flight control system, multi-mode pulse-doppler radar, and afterburning turbofan engine.

The project definition phase commenced in October 1986. French company Dassault-Breguet acted as a consultant for the design and system integration of the planned aircraft. Kota Harinarayana was appointed as the director and chief designer of the LCA programme. While the project was initially conceived to replace the MiG-21 aircraft, the Minister of Defence told the Indian Parliament in 2021 that the aircraft is no longer considered as a replacement for the MiG-21, and is part of a general IAF fleet modernisation programme.

=== Design ===
The design of the LCA was finalised in 1990 as a small tailless compound delta wing design with relaxed static stability. To provide enhanced manoeuvrability, it was planned to be a control configured vehicle incorporating a digital fly by wire flight control system. Dassault-Breguet offered a hybrid fly by wire flight control system for the project, consisting of three digital channels and one analog channel, with a redundant analog channel as a back up. However, the ADA favored a quadruplex (four) digital channel flight control system. In 1992, a dedicated National Control Law team (CLAW) was set up by the National Aerospace Laboratories (NAL) to develop an indigenous fly by wire flight control system for the aircraft. While initially Lockheed Martin was proposed as a partner, it did not materialise following a United States led embargo in response to India's second nuclear tests in 1998. This delayed the programme partly by about 18 months.

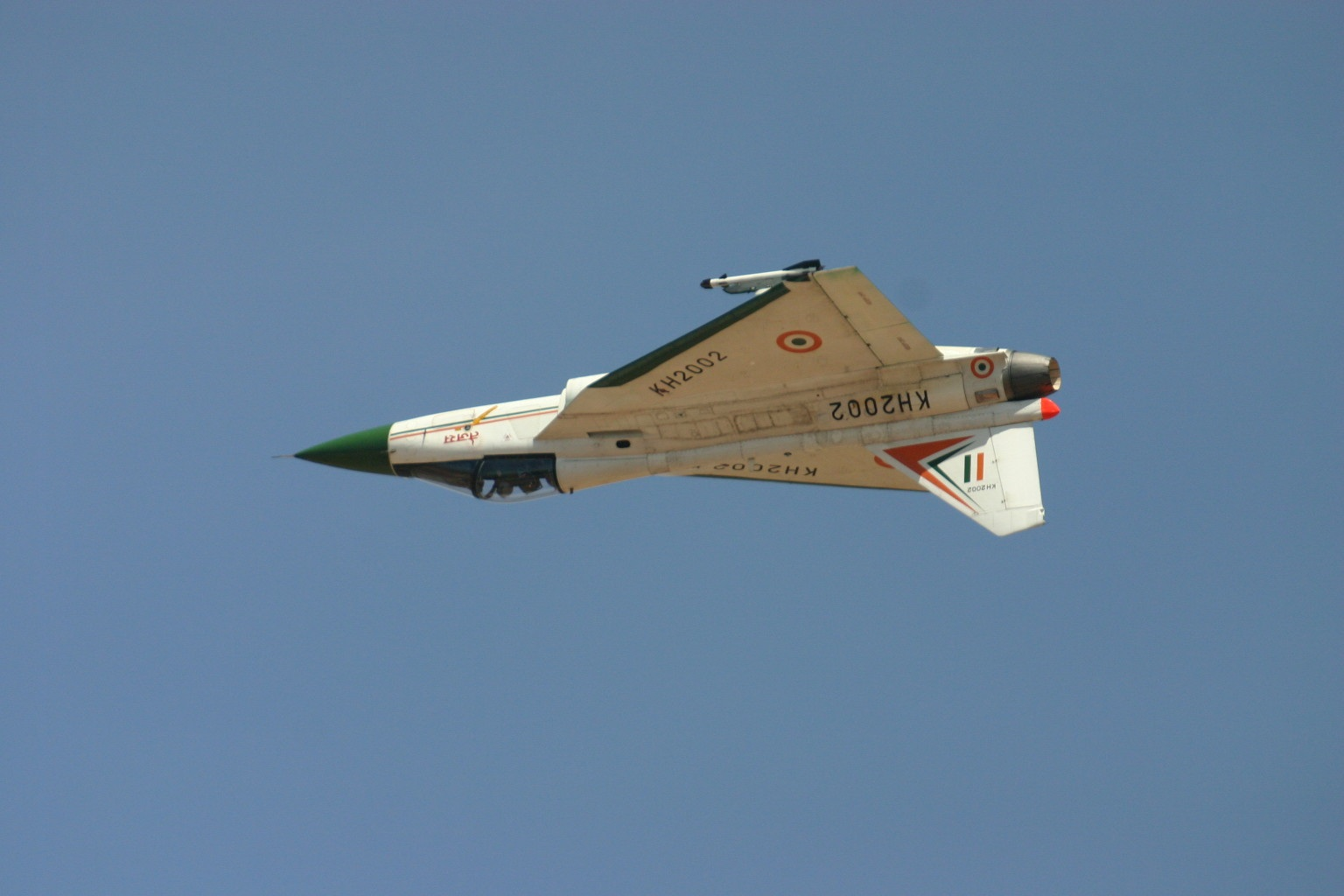
LCA Technology Demonstrator TD-2 (KH2002) in inverted flight

The quadruplex digital fly-by-wire flight control system was developed in house for the LCA. The CLAW team completed the design and integration of the flight control laws with the flight control system software, with the aid of an Iron Bird test rig. The flight control system conducted over 50 hours of pilot testing on the test rig. Aerodynamic characterization research was conducted at NAL's 1.2 m (3 ft 11 in) tri-sonic wind tunnel facility.

For the multi-mode radar (MMR), the team intended to use the Ericsson–Ferranti PS-05/A I/J-band multi-function radar used on Saab JAS 39 Gripen. However, DRDO later decided to develop an indigenous radar for the aircraft. DRDO's Electronics and Radar Development Establishment (LRDE) laboratory and HAL were jointly assigned the MMR development programme, and with the work commencing in 1997. The Centre for Airborne Systems was responsible for the MMR's test programme, and a HS-748 airborne surveillance aircraft was re-fitted for the purpose. By 2005, only two radar modes–the air-to-air look-up and look-down were successfully tested, and the performance of other modes that had been tested were rated as sub-optimal. The problem was attributed to the lack of compatibility between the radar and the LRDE's signal processor module.

The development of MMR was later abandoned in favour of using a foreign developed radar as an interim option. The Israeli Elta EL/M-2032 multi-mode and EL/M-2052 Active electronically scanned array radar units were selected for the Mk1 and initial Mk 1A aircraft respectively. In 2012, the DRDO started development of the Uttam AESA Radar, which was undergoing trails as of 2024.

The ADA was successful in the development and manufacturing of carbon fibre composite structures and skins, and a glass cockpit for the aircraft. The Autolay computer-aided design software developed as part of the LCA programme was later licensed to Airbus for its A380 wide-body aircraft project. The government's self-reliance goal oriented development considerably increased the sourcing of indigenous components for the programme and contributed to the expansion of the aviation industry. For the LCA programme, Amphenol provided loom assemblies, Lakshmi Machine Works produced air intakes, and Tata Advanced Systems manufactured the composite parts.

=== Prototypes and testing ===
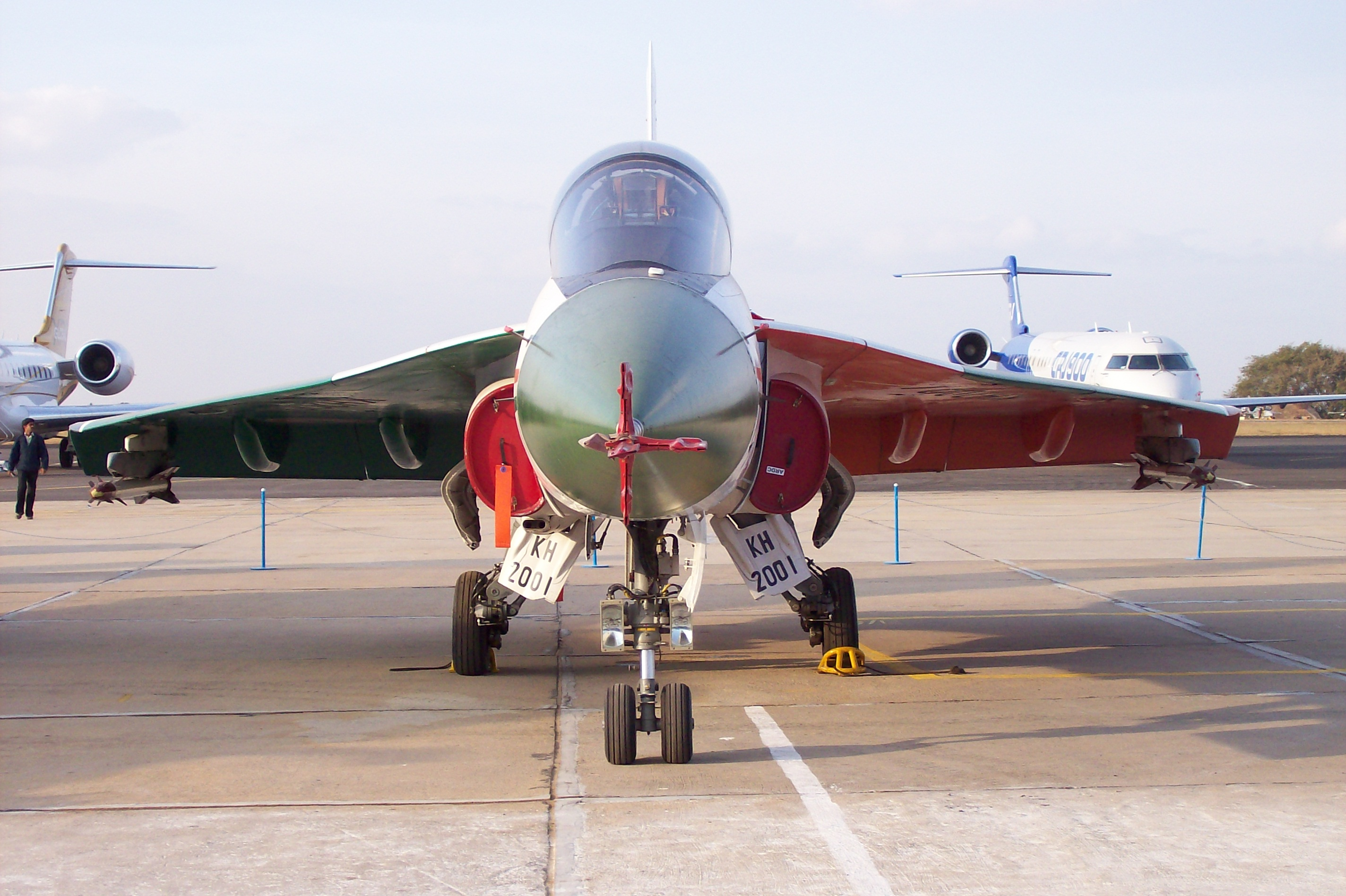
LCA Technology Demonstrator TD-1 (KH2001) at Aero India 2007

On 4 January 2001, the first technology demonstrator (TD-1) successfully achieved flight. The second such aircraft (TD-2) began testing in 2003. The first production variant (PV-1) made its maiden flight in 2003. The first trainer variant (PV-5) was rolled out in 2009 and made its first flight on 26 November 2009. A total of two trainer prototypes were built and designated PV-5 and PV-06. The first naval prototype, designated NP-1, made its first flight on 27 April 2012. It was a twin-seater aircraft, while the second naval prototype, designated as NP-2, was a single seater. Both naval prototypes were used extensively for various aircraft carrier-related trials at the Shore Based Test Facility in Goa. NP-2 was used in the actual carrier trials, where it made an arrested recovery and ski-jump assisted take-off from the aircraft carrier INS Vikramaditya in January 2020.

Tejas FOC on wet contact trial from Ilyushin Il-78 tanker

The first Limited Series Production aircraft (LSP-1) performed its maiden flight on 25 April 2007. A total of seven limited series production (LSP) aircraft were built. The LSPs were extensively used for developmental trials such as weapon testing – involving test firing of the R-73 and Python-5 close combat missiles, the I-Derby ER beyond visual range air-to-air missile and guided–unguided munition releases. The LSPs were also used for sensor trials involving integration and testing of the Israeli Elta EL/M-2032 multi-mode radar, and EL/M-2052 AESA radar, and the Indian Uttam AESA Radar and Rafael Litening targeting pod. The Uttam radar was integrated on the Tejas LSP-2 and LSP-3, and logged about 30 hours of flight testing on the Tejas alone. The high altitude trials and hot weather trials were carried out with the LSPs and the PV-3 prototype, in IOC and FOC configurations. These trials were mainly focused on assessing the performance of the various sensors and avionics on board, at temperatures ranging from below -10 degree Celsius to more than +45 degrees Celsius.

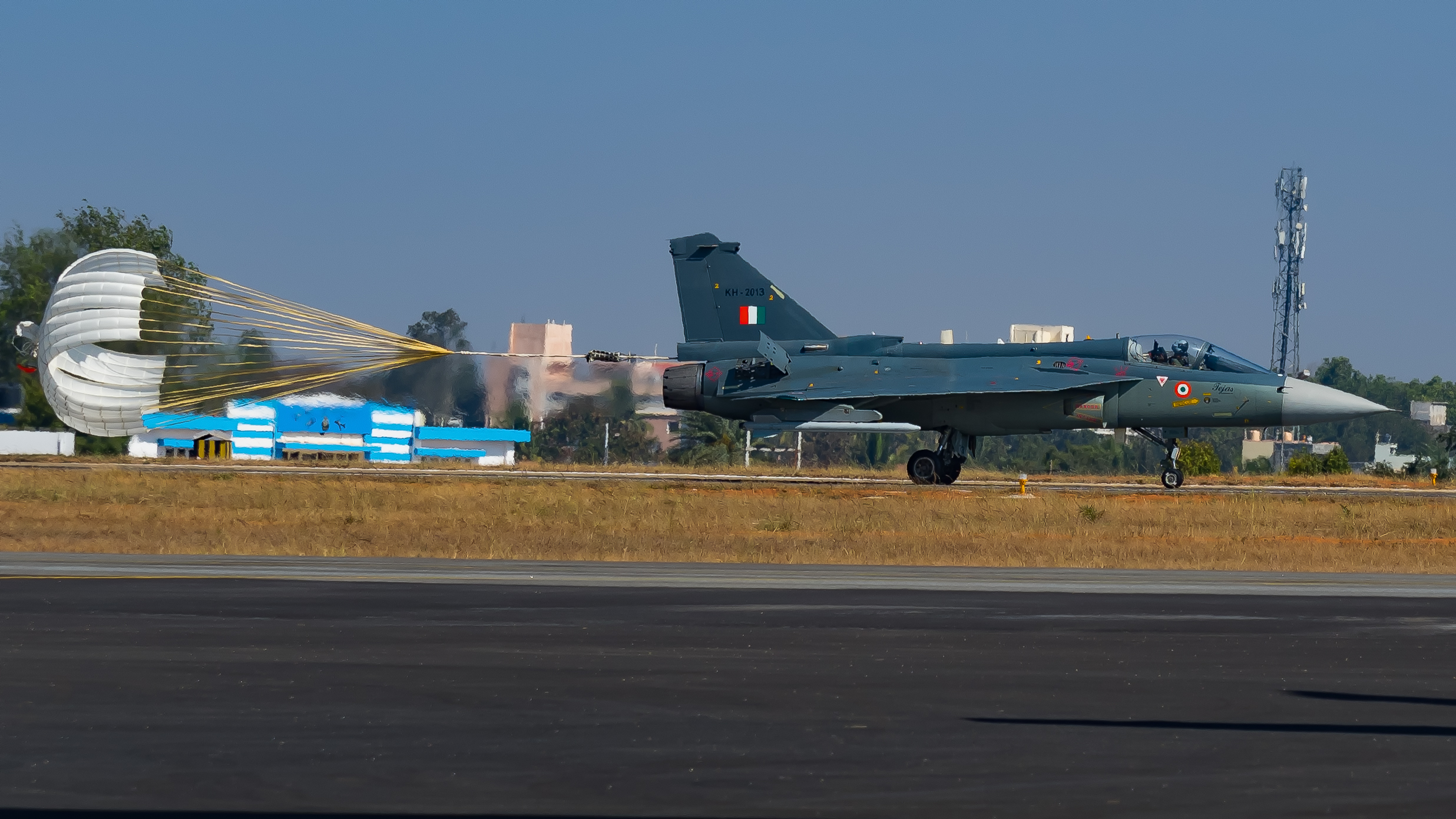
Tejas Limited Series Production aircraft LSP-3 on landing run

Sea trials to assess the radar performance in air-to-air and air-to-sea modes at various altitudes were carried out in 2010. Flutter vibration tests were also carried out in different configurations at high angle of attack (AoA) to assess the structural integrity across the flight envelope. LSP-4 completed the successful trial of BDL developed Counter Measure Dispensing System (CMDS) with R-73 missile on 2 December 2010. It worked well Open Architecture Mission Computer and Digital Stores Management System.

In the second half of 2012, the Tejas fleet was grounded for over three months and the ejection system had to be modified to resume flight tests by the end of 2012. In 2013, Tejas (LSP-7) conducted an inflight engine relight test at high altitude to assess the engine response on flameout, a critical parameter for operational clearance. The inflight engine relight test is crucial for single engine combat aircraft. On 15 April 2023, HAL received a flight clearance certificate for the Aircraft Mounted Accessory Gear Box (AMAGB) bearings and power take-off shaft. The Centre for Military Airworthiness and Certification (CEMILAC) also gave clearance for the pre-production of landing gear seals developed by the Combat Vehicles Research and Development Establishment (CVRDE) and Fluoro Carbon Seals Limited.

=== Operational clearance ===
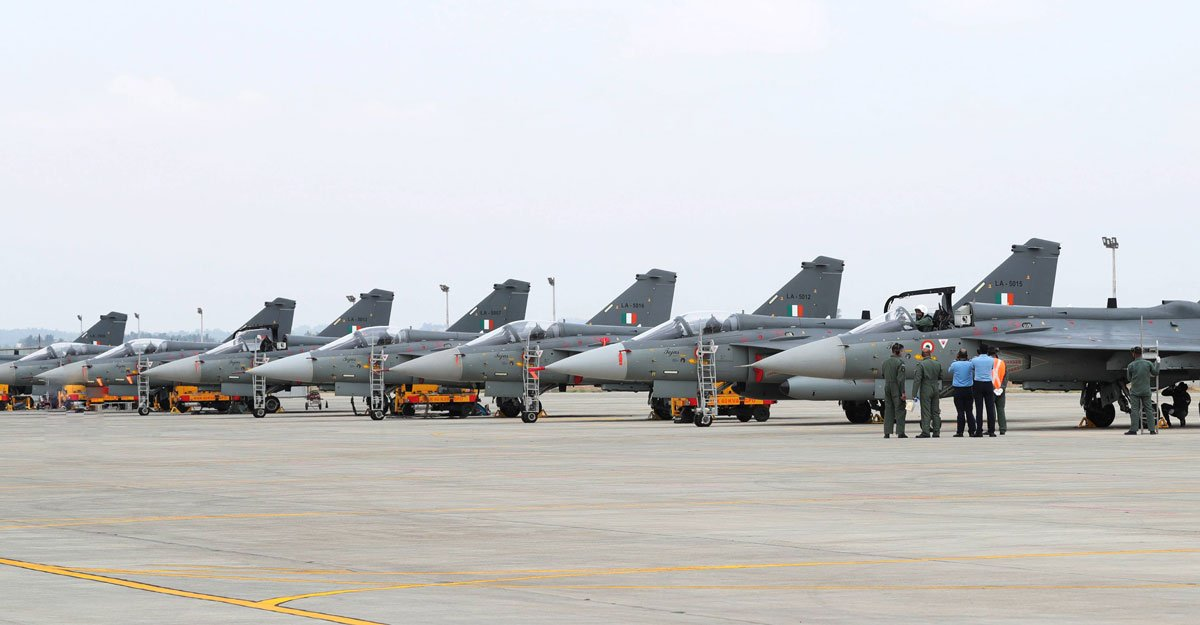
Tejas from No. 45 Squadron IAF stationed at Sulur Air Force Station

In December 2006, the IAF announced that it would form an "LCA Induction Team" to manage the aircraft's service introduction. The Tejas was awarded initial operational clearance-I (IOC-I) in January 2011. To ease up the process of FOC, an interim IOC-II was issued to Tejas in December 2013. The IOC-II expanded the g-limit, angle of attack and allowed the aircraft to carry precision guided munitions and close combat missiles. The IOC-II Tejas have an operational radius of 400–500 km (250–310 mi). The first squadron, consisting of Tejas in IOC-II configuration, became operational in 2016. The No. 45 Squadron IAF based at Sulur Air Force Station, Coimbatore was the first to have their MiG-21s replaced by Tejas aircraft at the base.

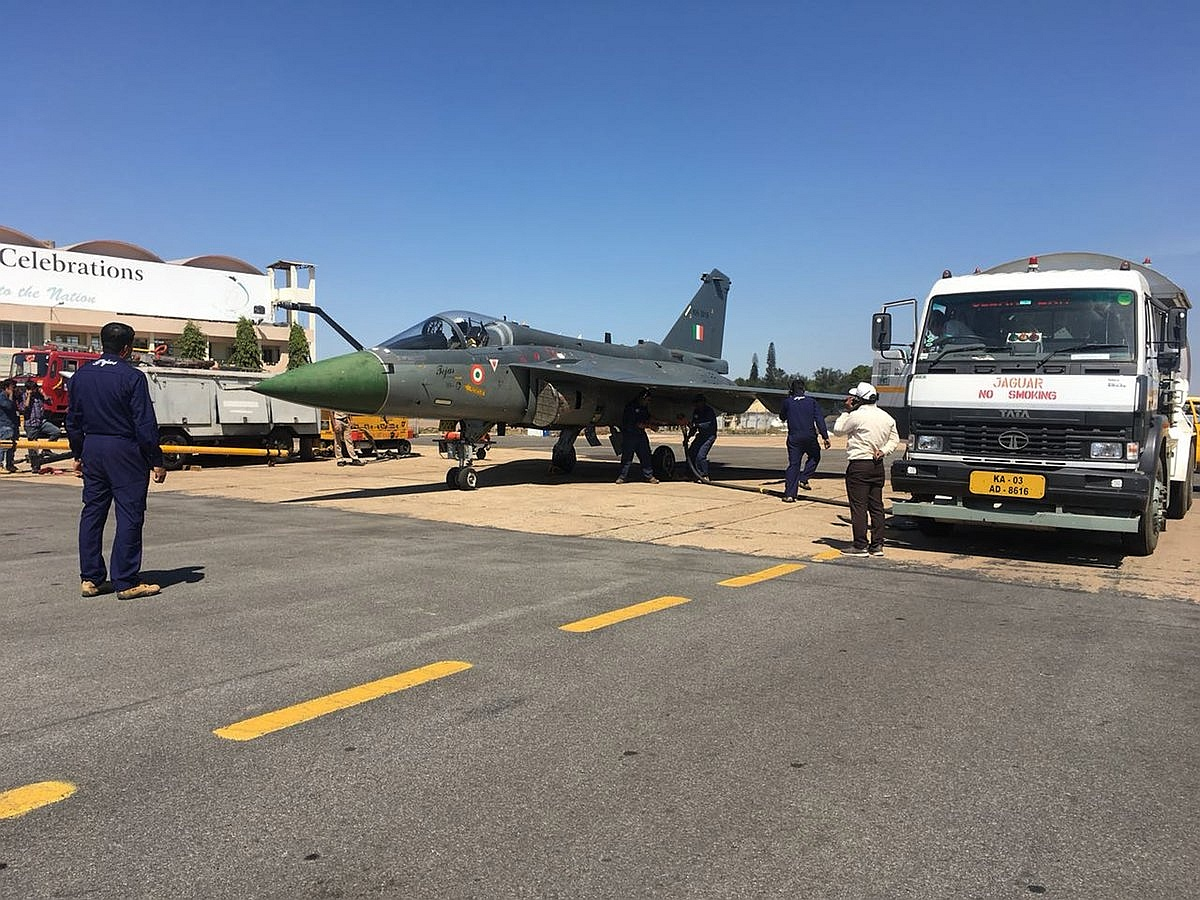
LCA Tejas hot refueling

The FOC campaign began in December 2014. Two critical parameters set by IAF for FOC clearance was expansion of angle of attack from 24 degree in IOC-II to 28 degree in FOC and inflight refueling capability. In February 2018, as part of the FOC campaign, the Tejas carried out a "hot refuelling" - refuelling with engine running, which shortens the turnaround time by 30% and doubles the sortie rate. In September 2018, the Tejas successfully completed its mid-air refuelling trials required for the aircraft to obtain its FOC. In January 2019, HAL received permission from CEMILAC to start production of the FOC standard Tejas.

On 20 February 2019, during the Aero India 2019 show, FOC was formally awarded to the Tejas. The HAL handed over the FOC certificate to the then Air Chief Marshal BS Dhanoa at the Yelahanka Air Force base. After the formal ceremoney, ACM Dhanoa stated that Tejas was "ready" and "behaved like a true fighter". The second Tejas squadron – No.18 Flying Bullets was formed at Sulur Air Force Station on 27 May 2020 with the first four serial production FOC aircraft.

A full mission simulator (FMS) phase-1 was commissioned at Sulur Air Force Station on 23 October 2021. Phase 1 of the FMS features training in aircraft handling and full envelope flying. Phase 2 will further augment the training with focus on weapons system and advance sensors onboard Tejas.

=== Upgrades and further development ===
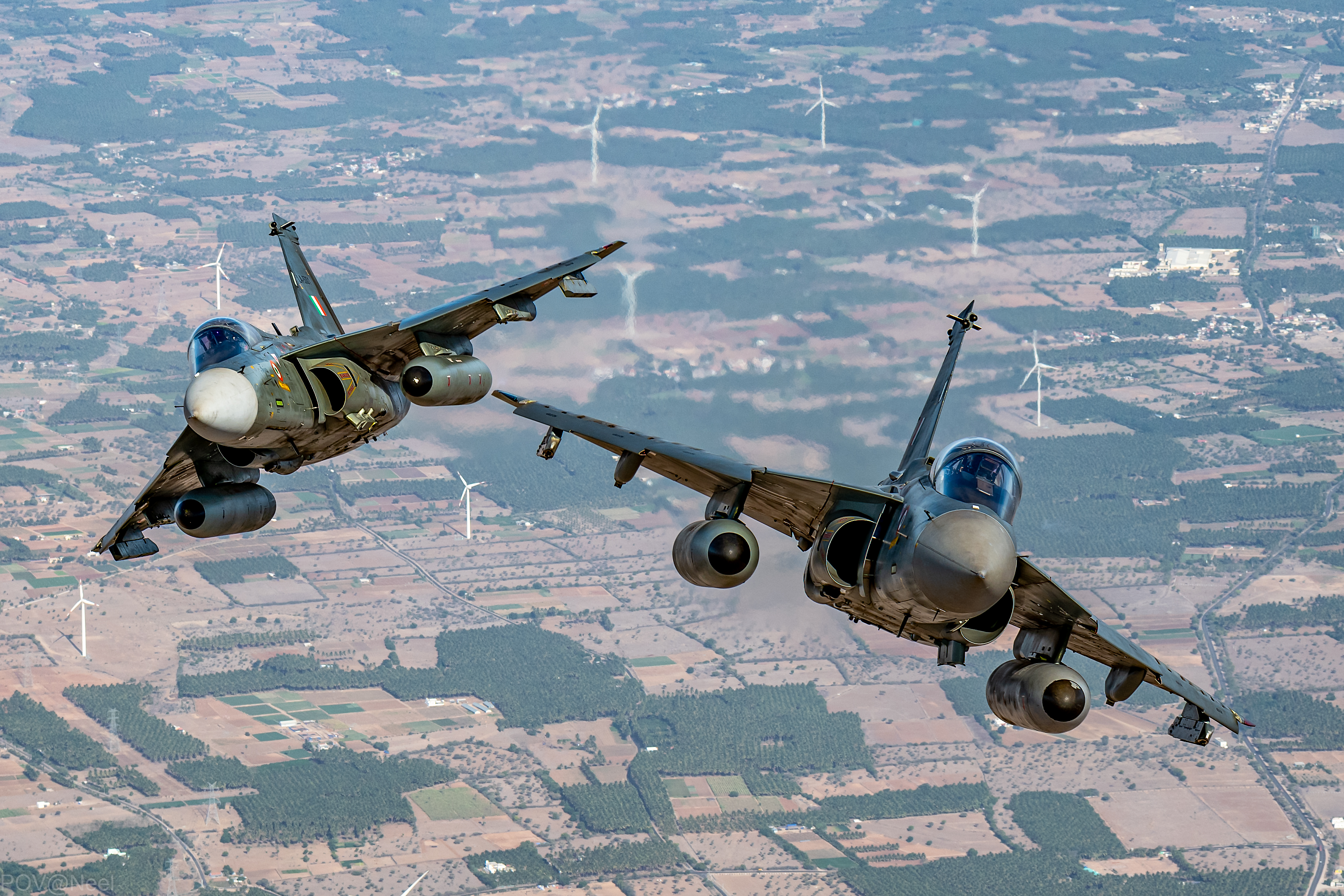
Tejas IOC aircraft, each carrying two drop tanks on inner pylons

In May 2015, the Comptroller and Auditor General of India (CAG) noted some shortcomings in the then-delivered Tejas Mark 1 IOC standard aircraft, which according to the CAG would limit the ability to survive and operation deployment of the aircraft in actual combat. A few of these shortcomings, including lack of combat endurance, were addressed in the Tejas Mark 1 FOC configuration aircraft. Tejas Mark 1 FOC is modified to perform in-flight refuelling from Ilyushin Il-78 and Sukhoi Su-30MKI. Tejas is also undergoing butt firing trials and air-to-air firing at HAL, Nashik facility with Gryazev-Shipunov GSh-23.

The shortcomings, such as the increased weight and reduced speed, would be addressed in the upcoming Tejas Mark 1A aircraft by increasing the use of composites in manufacturing and reducing the supersonic drag by using more aerodynamic pylons. The MK1A will also have AESA radar, a self-protection jammer, updated avionics and electronic warfare capabilities, among other improvements. The shortcomings identified by CAG that require redesign and structural modification such as increasing internal fuel capacity, are planned to be rectified in the Tejas Mark 2.

An agreement has been signed by the Indian Air Force and the Aeronautical Development Agency to include advanced weaponry and sensors into HAL Tejas. By transferring technical know-how for the smooth integration of weapons and sensors, ADA and the IAF's Software Development Institute (SDI) hope to empower the IAF to carry out integration and flight testing on its own.

On 5 March 2024, the high-altitude testing for On-Board Oxygen Generating System centric Life Support System (OBOGS-ILSS) of Tejas was successfully completed by DRDO. It could be used in MiG-29K, Tejas Mk2, AMCA, TEDBF and other aircraft with modifications. LCA PV-3 aircraft were used to test the system under a variety of flight conditions, including high g force and altitudes of up to 50,000 ft (15 km). OBOGS oxygen concentrations, demand breathing, 100% oxygen availability, and aerobatic maneuvers at the necessary altitudes for complete functional testing were carried out following CEMILAC flight approval. All of the parameters have been met by the system which will replace the earlier Liquid Oxygen System (LOX).

In December 2025, the Indian Air Force inducted the indigenously developed Hybrid Brake Parachute developed by Gliders India Limited (GIL). The lightweight parachute is meant to increase landing safety in case of emergency situations like high-speed recovery and reduces landing run. The chute weighs 10 kg, spans 5.75 m and covered an area of 17 m^{2} and has a Uni-Cross main canopy design. It can be deployed at emergency speeds of up to 340 km/h (180 kn).

==== Naval variant ====
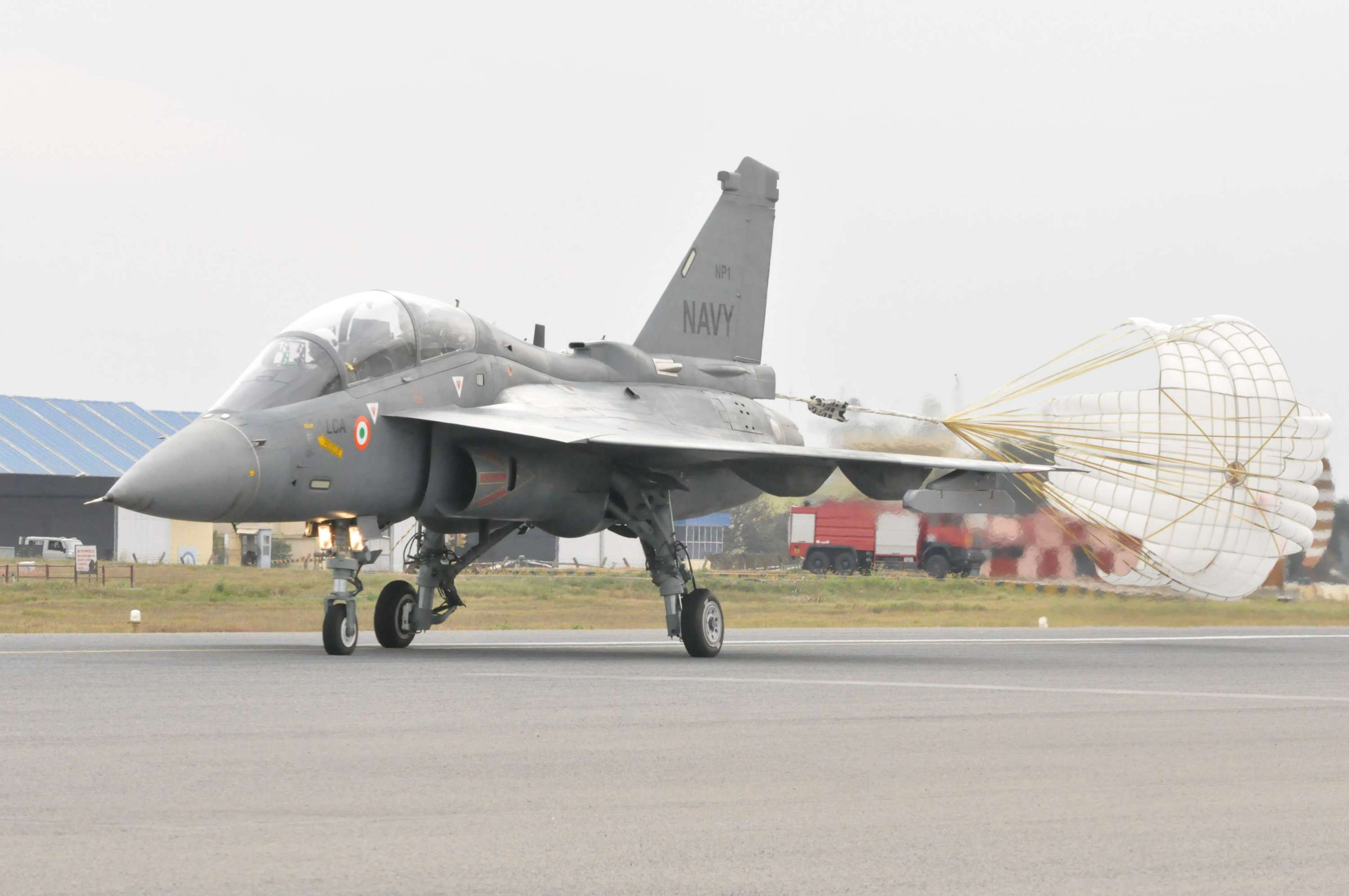
LCA Navy prototype NP-1

The Naval LCA programme was commenced in 2003. According to ADA, the Naval LCA (N-LCA) Programme was envisaged to be completed in two phases, under Phase-1 two naval prototypes were developed - the two-seat NP-1 and the single-seat NP-2, based on the Tejas Mark 1 design, to carryout carrier suitability certification and weapons integration. Under Phase 2, two single-seat prototypes were planned to be built, based on the Tejas Mark 2 design, with further design optimisation and integration of the General Electric F414 INS6 engine. The first naval prototype NP-1 was rolled out in July 2010, and made its first flight on 27 April 2012. The naval LCA has stronger landing gear to absorb the forces generated during carrier take off and arrested recovery.

In December 2014, the LCA Navy successfully made its first ski-jump assisted take off from a SBTF at INS Hansa. The navy variant has a distinctive flight control law mode which allows hands-free take-off.

In December 2016, the Indian Navy (IN) opted out of the programme, owing to the long delay and technical reasons – such as inadequate thrust to weight ratio of N-LCA for carrier based combat operations, and issued a fresh RFI for the procurement of 57 multi-role carrier borne fighters.

Because the technologies developed for the Tejas programme will be carried over to other platforms currently being developed by the ADA, test flying was continued.

In 2019, an LCA navy prototype successfully carried out the first arrested landing at the SBTF in Goa in day time and night time. As of December 2019, the Naval LCA programme completed 209 test flights, including 50 ski jump take-offs and 28 arrested landings. In January 2020, the naval prototype NP-2 successfully carried out its first arrested landing and ski-jump assisted take-off from the aircraft carrier INS Vikramaditya.

In July 2020, the DRDO announced that the plan to develop an LCA Mark 2 Navy had been dropped and they were working on a new carrier-borne fighter according to the Indian Navy's multi-role carrier borne fighter requirement floated in 2016 to replace the current fleet of MIG-29K/KUB carrier-based fighters. In Aero India 2021, a new twin engine naval fighter was unveiled, the Twin Engine Deck Based Fighter (TEDBF). The experience gained in the N-LCA programme will help in the development of TEDBF.

In February 2023, the naval prototype completed its maiden landing and take-off from the indigenous aircraft carrier INS Vikrant.

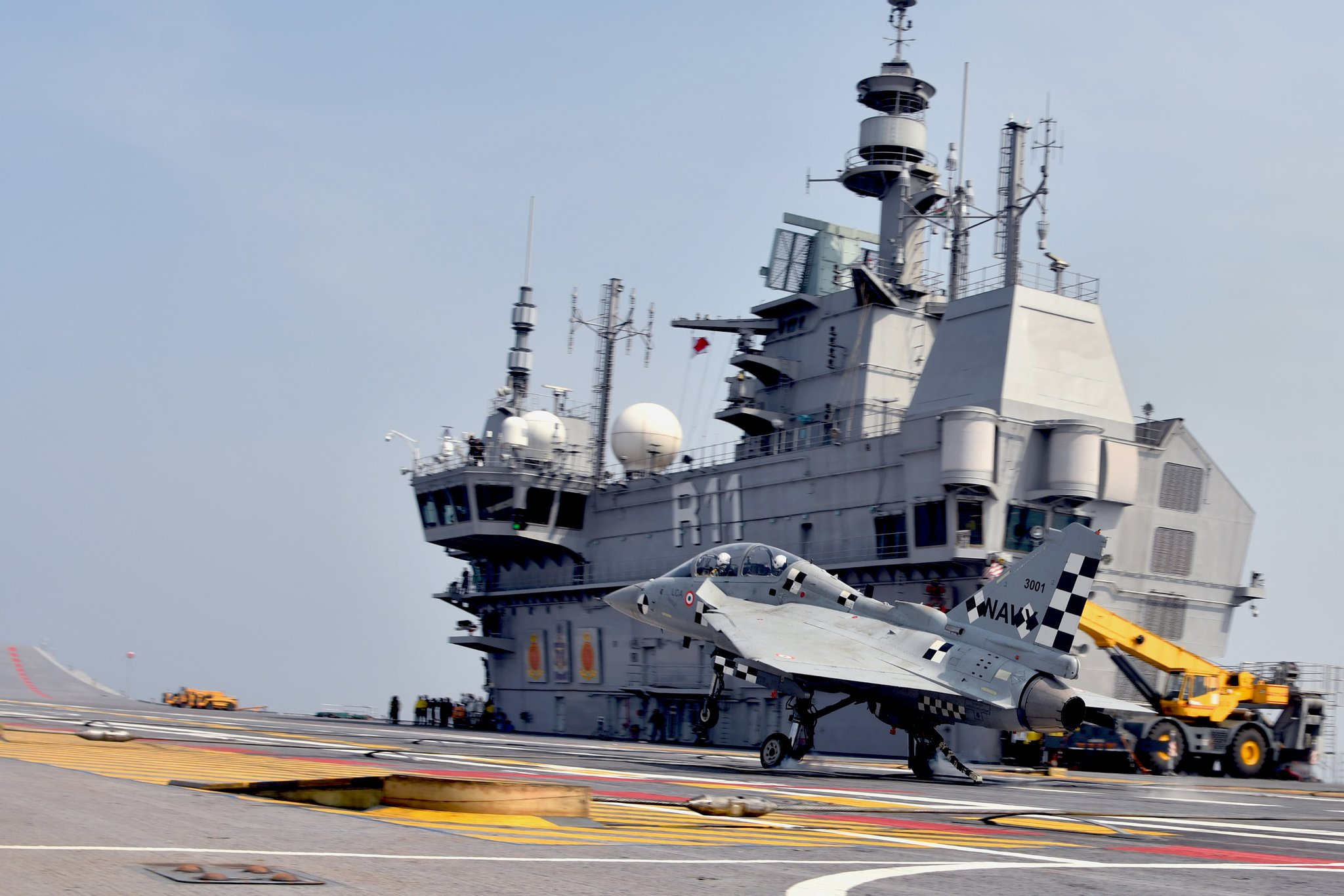
Tejas catching the wire on INS Vikrant

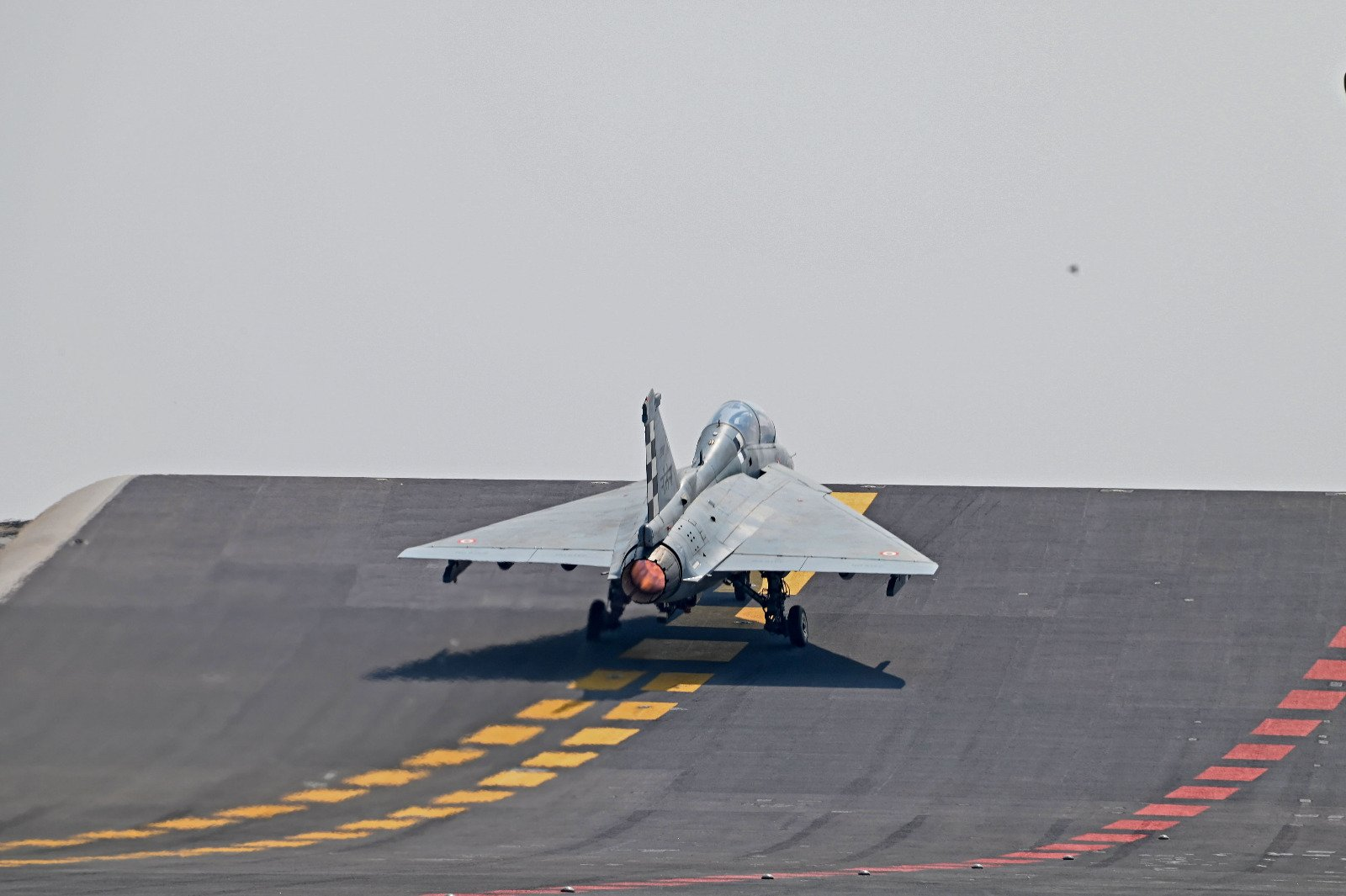
Tejas takeoff from INS Vikrant

Tejas landing onboard INS Vikrant

Tejas take off from INS Vikrant

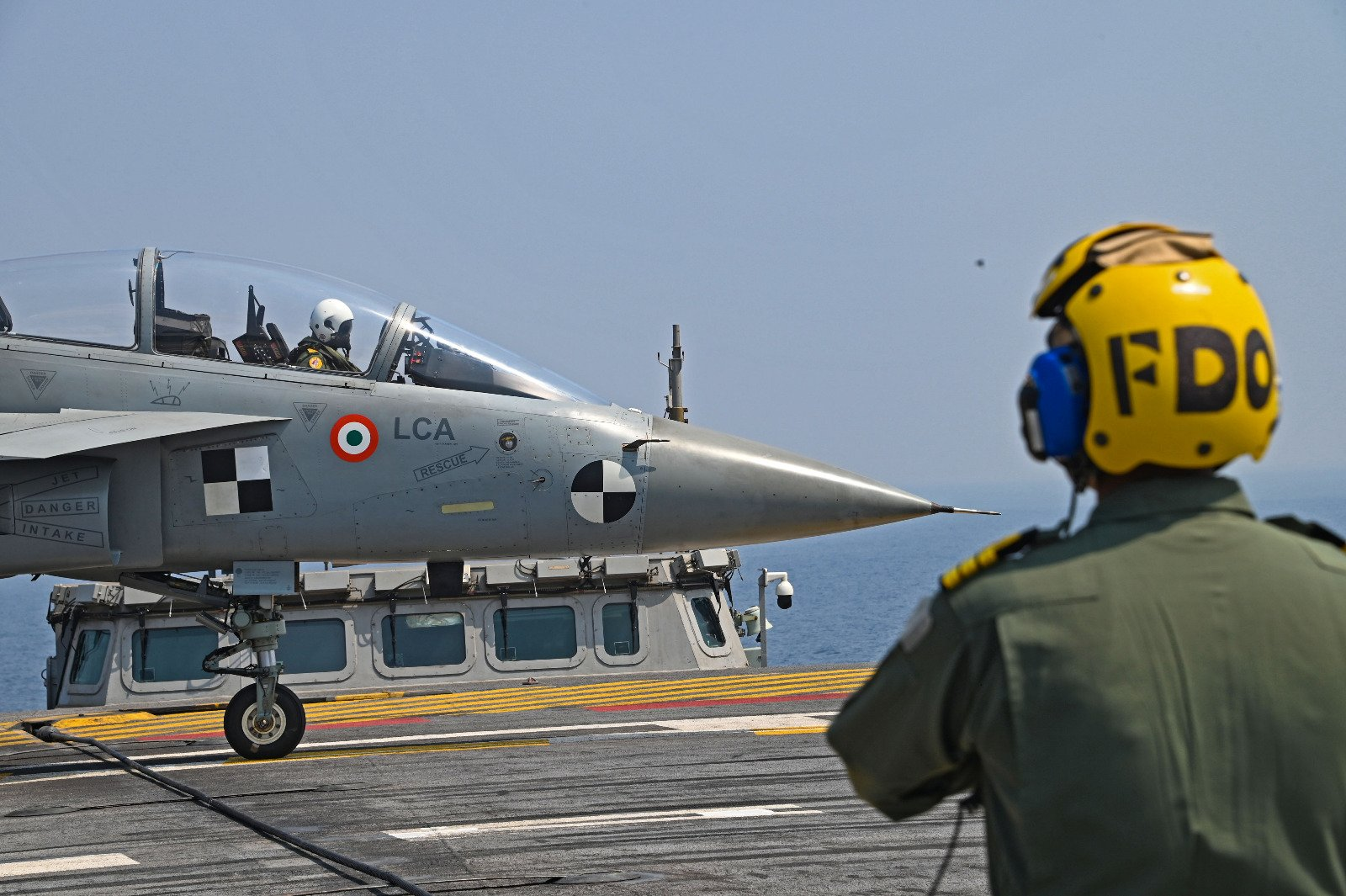
Tejas on INS Vikrant's flight deck

==== Tejas Mark 1A ====
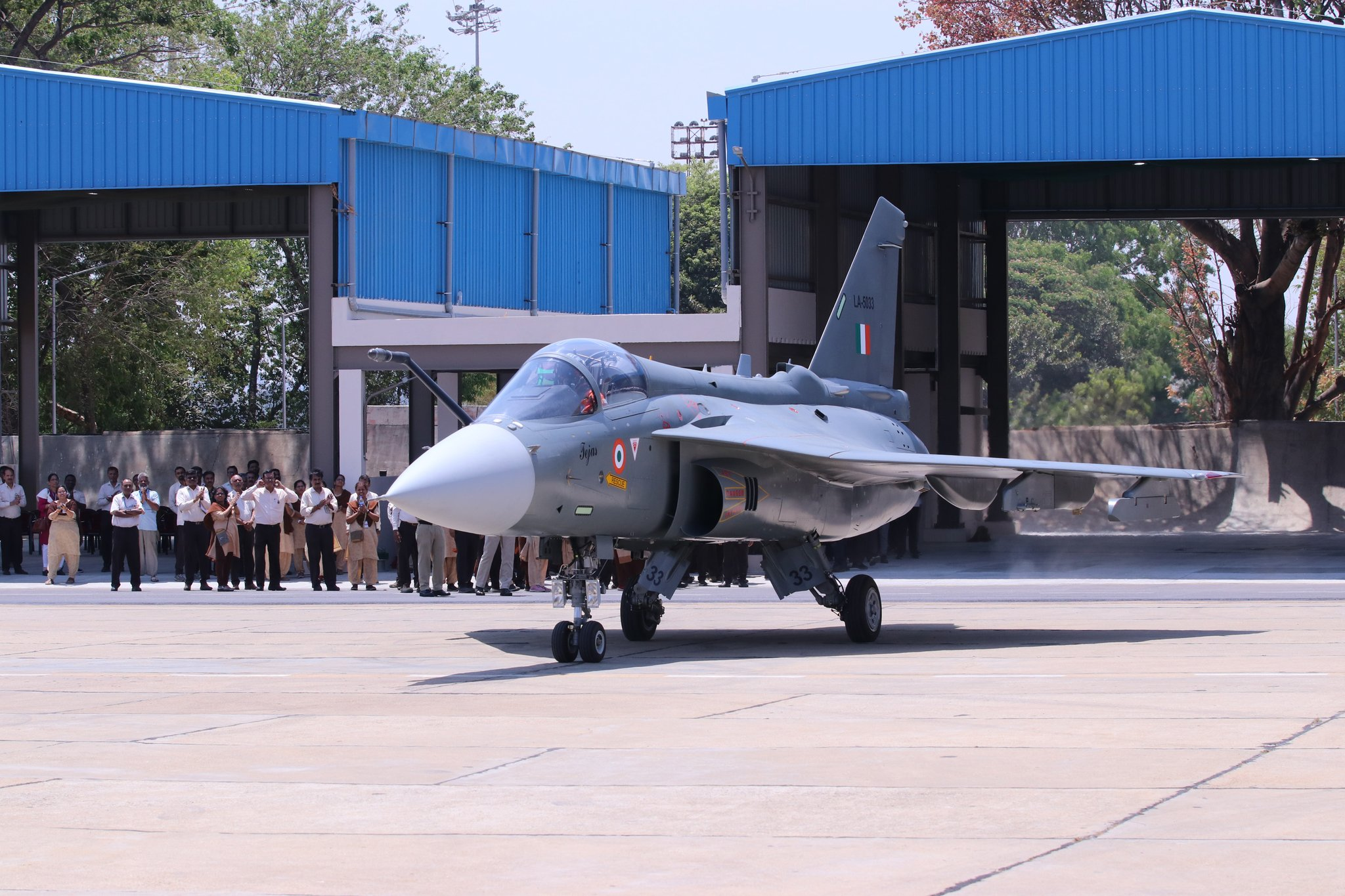
Tejas Mark 1A aircraft

The Mk 1A variant was first realised as an interim upgrade in 2015 by Manohar Parrikar, the then Defence Minister, amidst the first flight of Tejas Mk2 being delayed to 2022. The variant would include four major upgrades including integration of smart munitions and electronic warfare suites. The Mark 2 project has been further delayed to 2026 (by 2025)

The Tejas Mark 1A variant has more than 40 overall improvements over the Mark 1 variant. Upgraded Mark 1A features a new avionic suite centred on EL/M-2052 AESA Radar and Uttam AESA Radar developed in-house. DARE Unified Electronic Warfare Suite (UEWS), an externally mounted self protection jammer (SPJ) for enhanced survivability, in-flight refuelling capability, Onboard Oxygen Generation System (OBOGS) developed by Defence Bioengineering and Electromedical Laboratory for endurance and an expanded weapon suite consisting of Astra BVRAAM and ASRAAM. Two ASRAAMs are intended for use on Tejas Mark 1A. The production variant will come equipped with dual-rack pylons with weapon systems integration. HAL will install in-house developed Combined Interrogator and Transponder (CIT) with digital map generator by Mission and Combat Systems R&D Centre which helps transfer the required mission map on pilot display, an upgraded IFF+ from older identification friend or foe system. To better accommodate the pilots, cockpit floor is also reshaped. The upgraded Tejas Mark 1A will have a reduced turnaround time. Tejas Mark 1A will use indigenously developed Angad electronic warfare suite and DRDO Advanced Self Protection Jammer pod.

BEL will supply 20 types of locally developed critical avionics and upgrades such as Digital Flight Control Computers from ADA, Air Data Computer from DRDO, Weapon Computers from ADE, Radar Warning Receiver from Combat Aircraft Systems Development & Integration Centre, and Head-up display from Central Scientific Instruments Organisation from 2023 to 2028 for ₹2,400 crore.

In order to produce the BMI Engine Bay Door for the Tejas Mark 1A, HAL and National Aerospace Laboratories inked a technology transfer agreement. For the engine bay door, where it must survive a service temperature of roughly 200 °C, NAL Advanced Composites Division is creating a manufacturing process technique that uses Carbon-BMI Prepreg to create co-cured composite structures that are very temperature resistant. On 28 March 2024, Tejas Mark 1A, equipped with the first set of Carbon-BMI Engine Bay Door assembly, successfully completed the inaugural flight from HAL facility.

On 19 April 2024, ADA delivered the first batch of Secondary Flight Control of Tejas Mk 1A which consists of an indigenously designed leading-edge slat and Airbrake Control Module. These flight control systems features "state-of-the-art Servo-Valve based electro-hydraulic servo actuators and control modules." The development was the result of the collaboration between ADA, Research Centre Imarat, and Central Manufacturing Technology Institute. The technology is ready to be integrated with production variants of Tejas Mk 1A as it successfully completed flight trials. These are being produced at HAL Accessories Division in Lucknow. On 30 May 2025, the first centre fuselage assembly for the Tejas Mk 1A was handed over to HAL by subcontractor VEM Technologies in Hyderabad.

Milestones

- According to HAL Chairman and Director R Madhavan, the design activity of Tejas Mark 1A is moving ahead, and the testing of subsystems will be completed by 2021. The taxi trials will commence in the first half of 2022, and the first flight of Mark 1A prototype will happen in the second half of 2022.
- On 20 May 2022, the Tejas Mark 1A prototype completed its first flight. HAL intends to obtain a certificate from Centre for Military Airworthiness and Certification (CEMILAC) within 30 months before this version enters mass production.
- On 28 March 2024, the first production series Mark 1A aircraft (LA 5033) conducted its inaugural flight which lasted for 18 minutes. The aircraft will undergo more testing before being officially transferred to the IAF.
- On 12 March 2025, Astra Mk-1 successfully demonstrated a direct hit on a flying target from Tejas. This was a significant test for Mark 1A induction.

==== Tejas Mark 2 ====
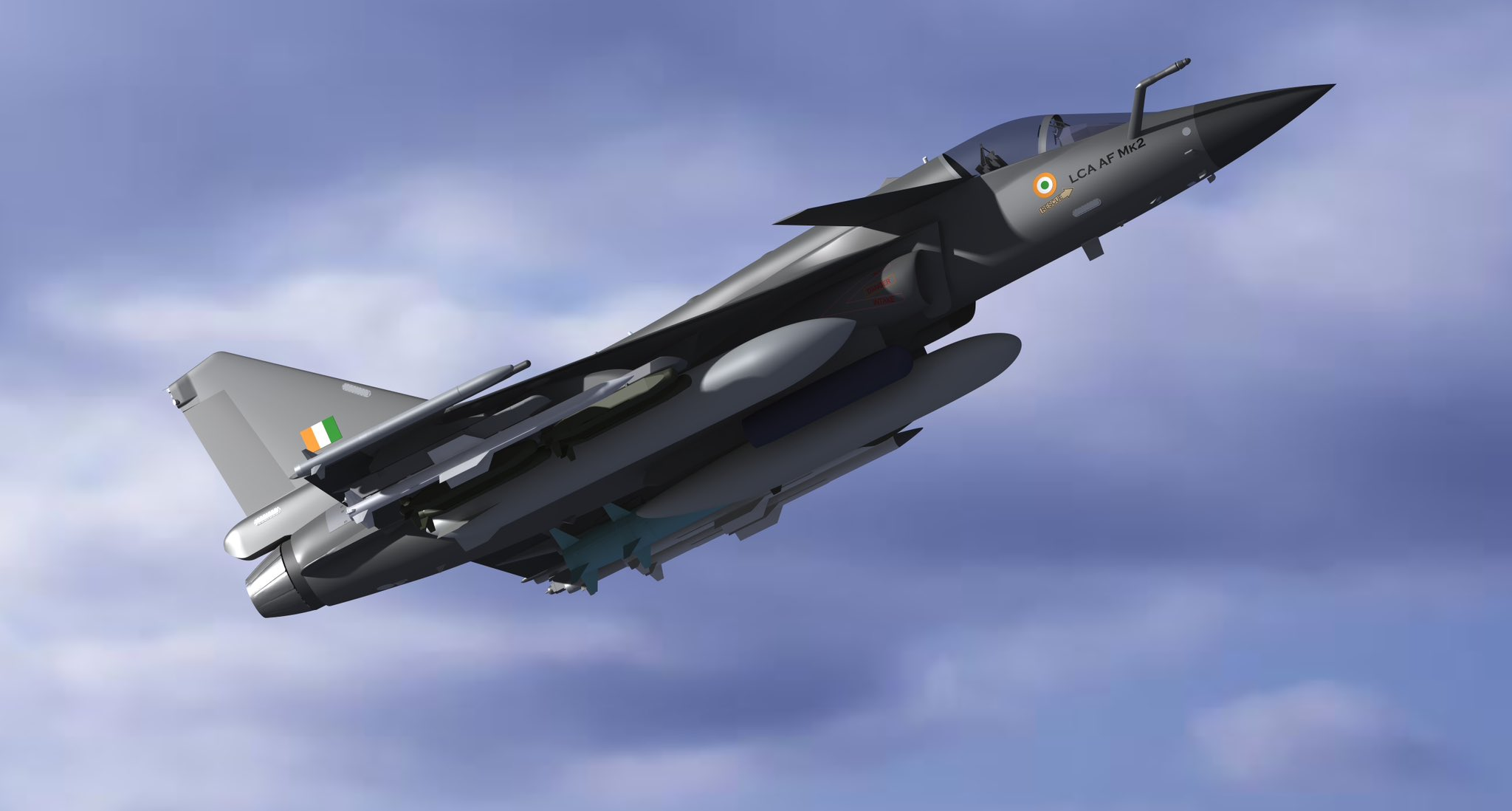
Tejas MK2 design

The HAL Tejas design has been further developed into the Tejas Mark 2, incorporating a more powerful General Electric F414 INS6 engine, canards and other design changes. The Tejas Mark 2, which is expected to be rolled out in 2025, will have an increased payload carrying capacity and internal fuel capacity, more external hardpoints, improved combat range, a completely redesigned cockpit, and an integrated infrared search and track (IRST) system, in addition to the AESA radar. The Defence Institute of Advanced Technology (DIAT) is developing aircraft health and usage monitoring systems (HUMS) to integrate the various sensors on board the Tejas Mark 2. The first flight of Tejas Mark 2 is expected to be in late 2025 or early 2026.

=== Program costs ===
==== Development costs ====
- LCA Programme - ₹9,063.96 crore (equivalent to ₹120 billion or US$1.2 billion in 2026) (up to March 2020)
- Kaveri engine programme - ₹2,032 crore (equivalent to ₹26 billion or US$280 million in 2026)
- ₹1,202 crore (equivalent to ₹15 billion or US$160 million in 2026) additional design and development (Jan 2021)

==== Flyaway costs ====
- ₹146.2 crore (equivalent to ₹255 crore or US$27 million in 2026) for IOC Mark 1 (2014)
- ₹156 crore (equivalent to ₹382 crore or US$41 million in 2026) for FOC Mark 1 (2010)
- ₹303 crore (equivalent to ₹371 crore or US$40 million in 2026) for Mark 1A and ₹309 crore (equivalent to ₹378 crore or US$40 million in 2026) for export variant (2021)

== Design ==
=== Overview ===
The Tejas is a single-engine multirole combat aircraft which has a tailless, compound delta wing design with "relaxed static stability" for enhanced manoeuvrability and agility. The Tejas is a multi-role combat aircraft and its flexibility permits it to carry out Interception, air-to-surface and anti-shipping roles in a single mission. The wind tunnel testing and computational fluid dynamics analysis have optimised the design of Tejas for minimum transonic and supersonic wave drag, as well low wing-loading.

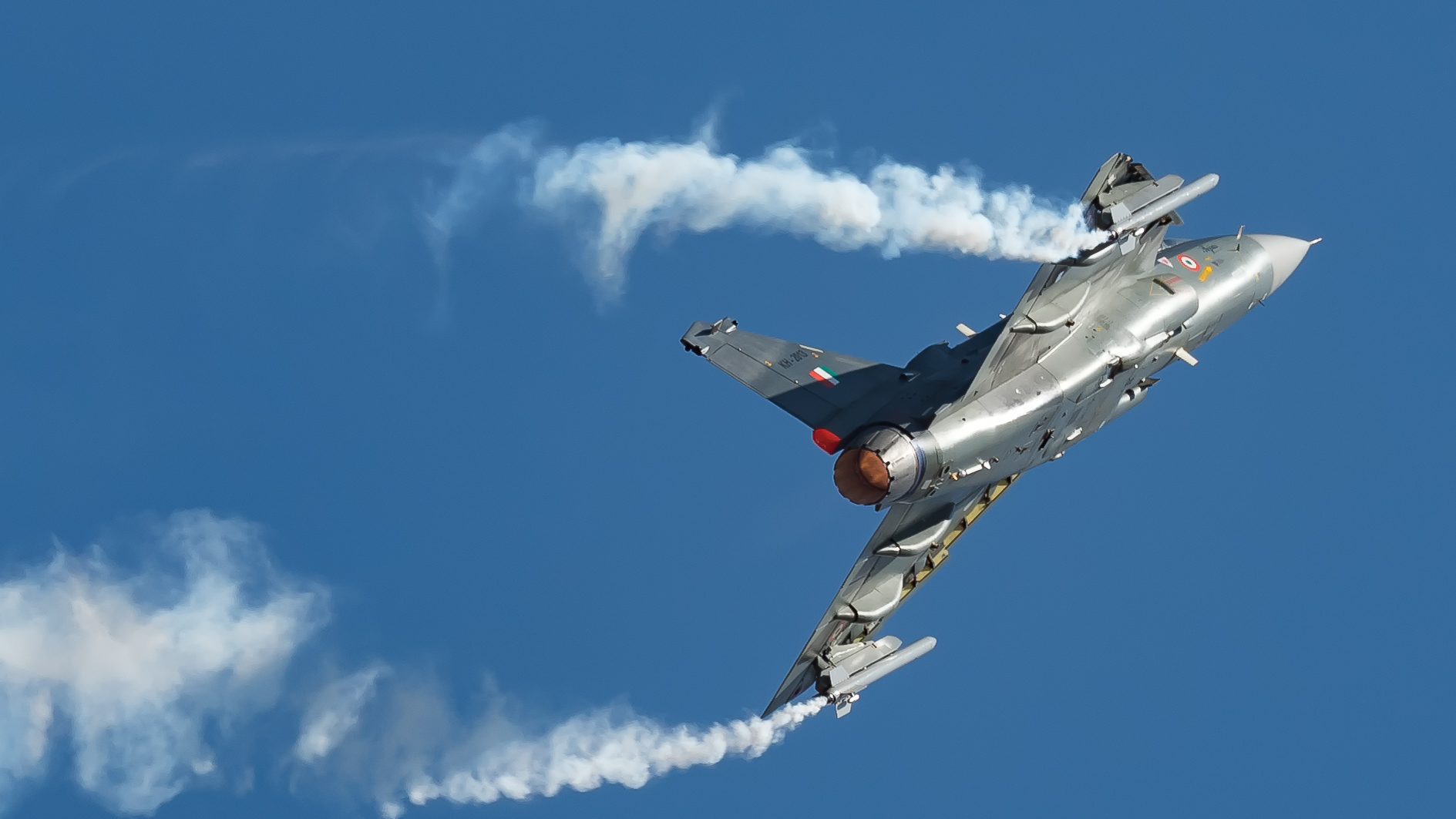
Tejas airshow demo

Tejas has eight hardpoints – one beneath the port-side air-intake, one under the fuselage (centreline station) and three hardpoints under each wing, of these, three are wet hardpoints which can carry drop tanks. The hardpoint beneath the port side air-intake is dedicated to carrying sensor pods such as FLIR, IRST or laser rangefinder/designator. These can also be carried on the centreline pylon and inboard pairs of wing stations. It has an aerial refuelling probe on the starboard side of the forward fuselage. The Tejas weapon suite consists of I-Derby ER and Astra beyond visual range air-to-air missiles and R-73, Python-5 and ASRAAM close combat missiles. The Tejas has an internal 23 mm Gryazev-Shipunov GSh-23 twin-barreled autocannon under the starboard side air-intake. The BrahMos-NG supersonic cruise missile is being developed for the Tejas.

The relatively smaller size, extensive use of airframe composites, the Y-duct inlet which shields the engine compressor blades, the application of radar-absorbent material (RAM) coatings and so on, reduces the overall radar cross-section of the aircraft.

=== Airframe ===
Apart from aluminium-lithium alloys and titanium alloys, carbon-fibre composite materials are used in the construction of the Tejas. The composite materials constitute 45% of the airframe by weight and 90% by surface area, the highest among contemporary aircraft. The upper and lower wing surfaces, wing spars and wing ribs are also made out of carbon-fibre composites, while the fin tip is made out of fiberglass. The extensive use of composite materials in the airframe not only makes the aircraft lighter but also gives high strength. This also reduces the number of joints or rivets, increases the aircraft's structural integrity and lowers its susceptibility to fatigue cracks. The tailfin is a monolithic honeycomb structure, reducing the manufacturing cost by 80% compared to traditional methods. Initially, the Tejas prototypes were equipped with a radome made out of Kevlar which was replaced with a quartz radome in the production aircraft. In July 2026, it was confirmed that the R&DE(E) of DRDO has completed the development of an indigenous quartz radome for LCA Mk1A and has successfully undergone all necessary structural, mechanical and electromagnetic performance trials and is now ready for transfer to industry for production. The final evaluation under flight trials are underway. The radomes were so far sourced from Cobham Limited.

The naval LCA has a nose droop to provide improved view for carrier landings. In addition to the elevons, the naval LCA has wing leading–edge vortex controllers (LEVCON) control surfaces that extend from the wing-root leading edge, which could be deflected to a downward angle or an upward angle to increase lift and reduce airspeed during approach. The LEVCONs also provides better low-speed handling and increase controllability at high angles of attack (AoA). The naval Tejas also has a strengthened undercarriage, stronger landing gear, and an arrestor hook system for carrier landings. The two-seat LCA Navy variant (NP-1) have aerodynamic commonality with the trainer variant.

The Secondary Flight Control of Tejas Mk 1A consists of an indigenously designed Leading Edge Slats and Airbrake Control Module. Aeronautical Development Agency, on 19 April 2024, delivered the first batch of these flight control system. These flight control systems features "state-of-the-art Servo-Valve based electro-hydraulic servo actuators and control modules." The technology is ready to be integrated with production variants of Tejas Mk 1A as it successfully completed flight trials. These are being produced at Accessories Division, HAL, Lucknow.

=== Avionics ===
The avionics of the Tejas Mark 1 is centered around the Elta EL/M-2032 radar. Its digital flight control computer developed by ADE and manufactured BEL. It has an electronic warfare (EW) suite domestically developed by Defence Avionics Research Establishment, which consists of a radar warning receiver (RWR), integrated self-protection jammer, chaff and flare dispenser system. The Tejas Mark 1A variants are equipped with an AESA radar, a new high performance digital flight control computer (DFCC Mk1A), new EW suite and updated avionics. Some of the production Mark 1A fighters will be equipped with the Elta EL/M-2052 AESA radar, while rest of the aircraft are expected to fly with the domestically developed Uttam AESA Radar. The new EW system for the Mark 1A, developed by DARE known as the Unified Electronic Warfare suite (UEWS), will have electronic countermeasures and electronic counter-countermeasure capabilities, digital radio frequency memory based jamming and deception capabilities. The Tejas Mark 1A will also carry a pod-mounted self-protection jammer – the Elta ELL-8222WB. The Mark 1A will have software-defined radio-based secure communications and network-centric warfare capabilities.

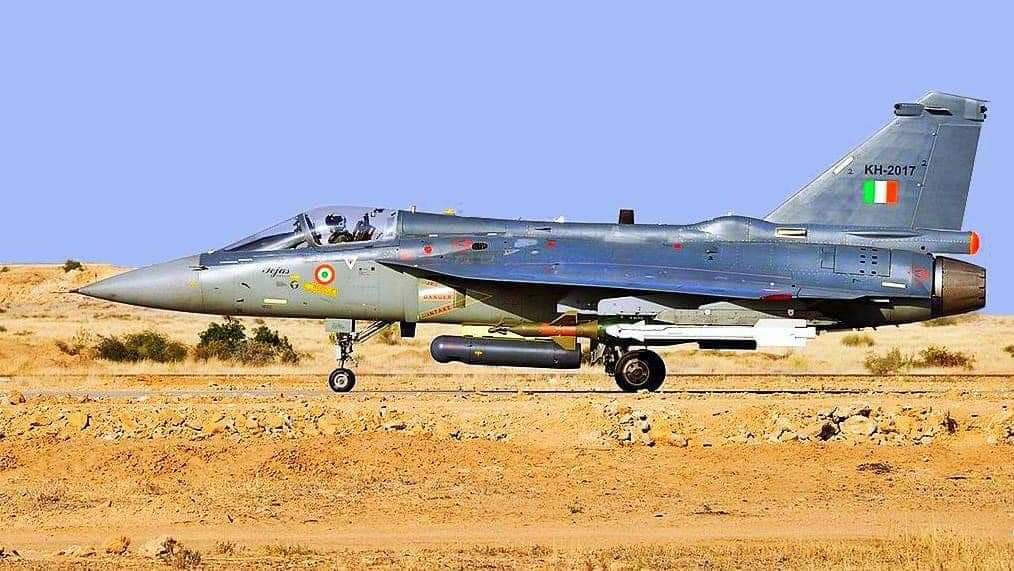
Tejas LSP-7 with Griffin LGB (in green and red), Litening III (in metallic grey) and Vympel R-73E (in white)

The Tejas can also carry pod-based sensors such as forward looking infrared (FLIR). Currently the Tejas is cleared to carry the Rafael Litening III targeting/reconnaissance pod, while an advanced version named Litening 4I will be integrated on the Tejas. The Litening 4I pod, developed by the C4I systems division of Rafael, enables the aircraft to carry out reconnaissance, surveillance and intelligence gathering, in addition to target acquisition. The Tejas has an integrated health-monitoring system.

The Tejas has a night vision goggles compatible glass cockpit, equipped with a domestically developed HUD, three multi-function displays, two Smart Standby Displays by CSIO. The Tejas has hands-on-throttle-and-stick arrangement to reduce pilot's workload. The displays provide key information on a need-to-know basis, the pilot interacts with onboard systems through a multi-functional keyboard and several selection panels. The Tejas has a "get-you-home" panel coupled with an air data computer developed by Bharat Electronics Limited to assist the pilot in case of an emergency. The cockpit is equipped with Martin-Baker 16LG zero-zero ejection seat and canopy severance system developed by DRDO's ARDE and HEMRL for safe ejection. For life support, Tejas Mark 1 relies on conventional liquid oxygen LOX system, while an onboard oxygen-generation system (OBOGS) has been developed for Tejas Mark 1A. The ADA has developed virtual reality assisted cockpit simulator for Tejas, and N-LCA. Currently Tejas pilots are flying with Elbit DASH IV helmet-mounted display system.

The DRDO-developed fighter aircraft escape system has passed the high-speed rocket-sled test at controlled did at the Rail Track Rocket Sled facility of the TBRL in Chandigarh in December 2025.

Tejas Mk 1A's Swayam Raksha Kavach EW package, which includes the Advanced Self Protection Jammer pod and the Dhruti DR118 RWR, is based on the D-29 EW Suite developed for the MiG-29. The RWR has four channel wide band receivers, which enhance the possibility of detecting and precisely determining the direction of enemy airborne and ground-based radars. The LSP-3 (KH2013) aircraft was used to test the SRK EW suite for an integrated mode of operation with internal RWR sensor and the ASPJ pod. It included a restricted multi-emitter test scenario for ground and aerial radar jamming. In 2023, several tests and sorties were carried out to check the integration of the SRK EW suite with Uttam radar. As of 30 October 2025, the EW suite is undergoing flight trials which is scheduled to conclude by mid-2026. Development of the system started in 2021, and deployment is anticipated by the end of 2026. While the RWR is integrated within the aircraft, the ASPJ pod will be mounted on a hardpoint.

=== Flight control system ===
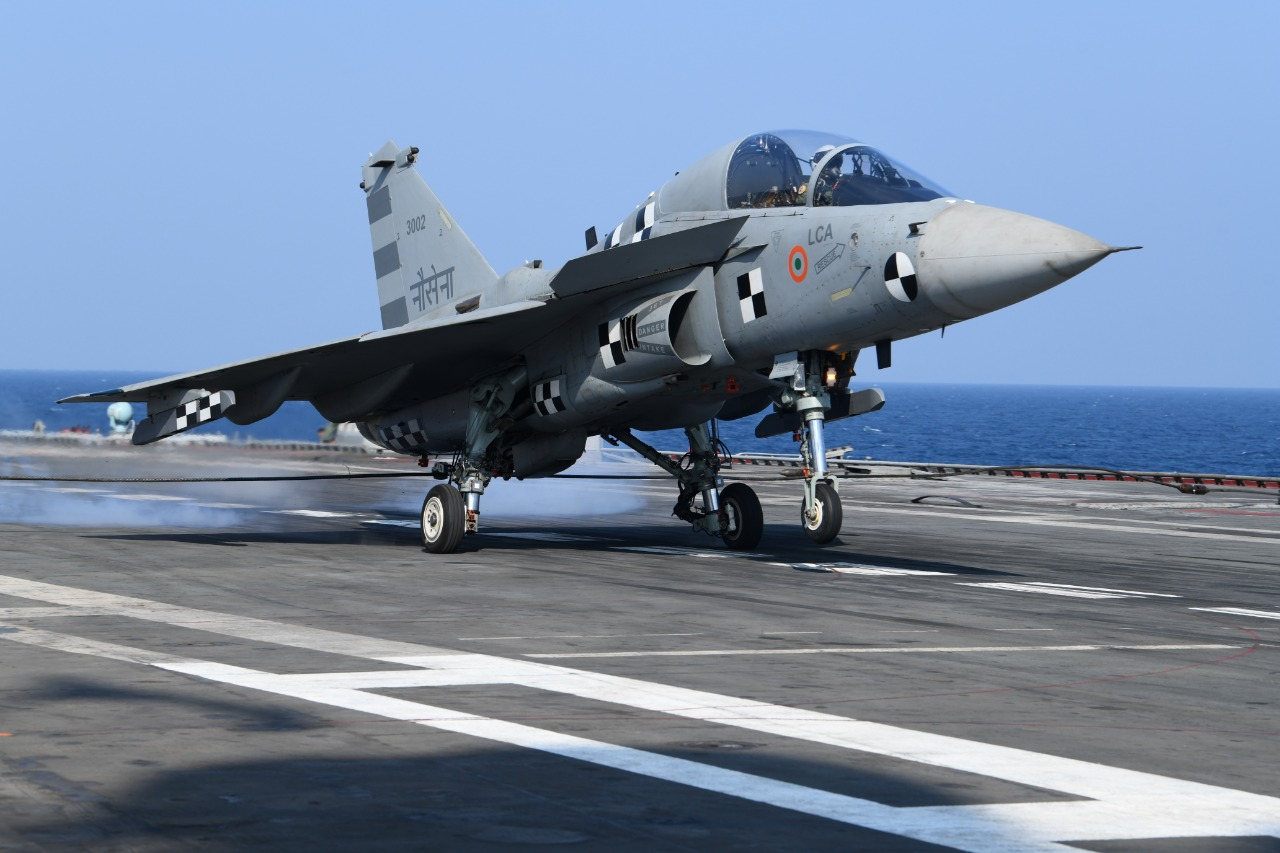
Naval variant has additional flight control laws (source codes) for LEVCON and hands-free take off

The aerodynamic configuration of Tejas is based on a delta-wing layout with shoulder-mounted wings. The control surfaces include three-section slats on the wing's outer leading edge while the inboard sections of the wings have additional slats to generate vortex lift over the inner wing and high-energy air-flow along the tail fin to enhance high-AoA stability. The wing trailing edge fits two-segment elevons to provide pitch and roll control. The only empennage-mounted control surfaces are the single-piece rudder and two airbrakes, located in the upper rear part of the fuselage, one each on either side of the fin. Since the Tejas is a relaxed static stability design, it is equipped with a NAL-developed full authority quadruplex digital fly-by-wire flight control system and an open architecture digital flight control computer developed by BEL. Its flight control surfaces are controlled by hybrid electro-hydraulic actuators through the digital flight control computer. The fly-by-wire flight control system of the Tejas has an advanced feature called auto low-speed recovery. This enables envelope protection at low speed and high angles of attack. It prevents the aircraft from entering into uncontrolled flight while maneuvering. Another feature is disorientation recovery function, once engaged it will recover the aircraft to an optimal altitude, airspeed and level flight. Some of the flight control laws for these features were formulated by the IIT Bombay research university.

On 19 February 2024, Tejas Mark-1A prototype LSP-7 successfully completed sortie with indigenously designed high performance Digital Flight Control Computer. The system was developed by Aeronautical Development Establishment (ADE). The latest DFCC has a quadraplex PowerPC-based processor, a fast I/O controller based on an autonomous state machine, increased computational throughput, and sophisticated on-board software that satisfies DO-178C level-A safety regulations. All important metrics and the flight controls' performance were deemed adequate during the flying test.

=== Propulsion ===
Developing an indigenous jet engine for Tejas was one of the five self-reliance goals identified at the beginning of the LCA Programme. A programme led by the Gas Turbine Research Establishment (GTRE) to design and develop an indigenous powerplant, the Kaveri, was launched as early as in 1986. However Kaveri jet engine development faced some setbacks, hence the General Electric F404-GE-F2J3 afterburning turbofan engine was procured as an interim solution. Ten units of the F404-F2J3 engine power the Technology Demonstrator and Prototype variants of Tejas. Since 2004, uprated General Electric F404-GE-IN20 engines are being used on LSP, Naval prototypes and Mark 1 variants of Tejas.

The production Tejas Mark 1 is powered by the F404-IN20 engine, with the same power-plant intended to power Mark 1A variant also, while the heavier Tejas Mark 2 will be powered by a General Electric F414-INS6 engine.

GE-F404 engine orders
Year	Variant	Number ordered	Due by	Delivered	Purpose	Ref.
1989	F2J3	10		10	Prototype and Demonstrators	
2004	IN20	17		17	LSP	
2007	IN20	24		24	Mk1 IOC	
2011	IN20	24	2016	24	Mk1 FOC	
2021	IN20	99	2029	12	Mk1a batch 1	
2025	IN20	113	2032		Mk1a batch 2	
Total		287		87		

== Serial production ==
=== Orders ===
- First Tejas Mk1 contract (total 20 jets):
  - 31 March 2006 — Indian Government on behalf of the Indian Air Force placed an initial order for 20 LCA Tejas, from HAL, for delivery by December 2011. The order comprised 4 twin seat trainers, and 16 single seat Tejas IOC II.
  - September 2024 — The delivery, scheduled for completion in 2011, was finally completed.
- Second Tejas Mk1 contract (total 20 jets):
  - 23 December 2010 — Indian Government ordered 20 additional LCA Tejas, comprising 4 twin seat trainers, and 16 single seat Tejas FOC bringing the total aircraft to 40. It was to be delivered by December 2016 at a cost of ₹5,989.39 crore (US$1.31 billion).
  - 27 March 2025 — The contract value was revised to ₹6,542.20 crore (equivalent to ₹68 billion or US$720 million in 2026).
  - 10 January 2025 — 38 of the 40 aircraft were delivered and the last two trainers would be delivered soon.
  - 11 January 2025 — The last of the 40 Tejas aircraft - LT-5208 - took its first flight.
  - 5 February 2025 — The final two of the trainers were yet to be delivered owing to not meeting the service requirements.
  - 11 September 2026 — The final two trainers were reported to be ready for delivery.
  - 18 September 2026 — The seventh and eighth trainers were delivered to the Indian Air Force which completed the first two Tejas orders placed in 2006 and 2010, respectively.
- First Tejas Mk 1A 2021 contract (total 83 jets):
  - August 2018 — The Defence Acquisition Council accorded Acceptance of Necessity for procurement of 73 Tejas Mk 1A aircraft with active electronically scanned array radar, beyond-visual-range missile, self-protection jammer, and aerial refueling capabilities. The rest of 10 trainer aircraft would be of Tejas Mk1 standard.
  - 13 January 2021 — Cabinet Committee on Security cleared the procurement of 73 Tejas Mk 1A single seater and 10 Tejas Mk 1 twin seater trainer at the cost of ₹45,696 crore (equivalent to ₹560 billion or US$6.0 billion in 2026) with additional funds for Design & Development and Infrastructure worth ₹1,202 crore (equivalent to ₹15 billion or US$160 million in 2026).
  - 3 February 2021 — Ministry of Defence signed the contract with HAL on the inaugural day of Aero India 2021 at a cost of almost ₹48,000 crore (equivalent to ₹590 billion or US$6.3 billion in 2026).
  - 17 August 2021 — HAL signed a contract with GE worth ₹5,375 crore (equivalent to ₹66 billion or US$700 million in 2026) to supply 99 F404 engines and service support by 2029.
- Second Tejas Mk 1A contract (total 97 jets):
  - 16 September 2023 — Air Chief Marshal VR Chaudhari stated that the IAF has decided to order 97 more Mark 1A fighter jets including 29 Tejas Mk 1A standard trainer jets.
  - 30 November 2023 — The Defence Acquisition Council accorded Acceptance of Necessity for procurement of additional 97 Tejas Mk 1A for IAF from Hindustan Aeronautics Limited under Buy (Indian-IDDM) category
  - 12 April 2024 — MoD issued ₹65,000 crore (equivalent to ₹690 billion or US$7.4 billion in 2026) tender to HAL for 97 Tejas Mark 1A fighter jets. Clearance for the deal expected to be received from CCS in December 2024 and deal to be signed by year-end.
  - August 2025 — Negotiations for additional F404 engines is expected to be completed this month, while the contract for 97 Tejas Mark 1A was cleared by the CCS on 19 August 2025 for ₹66,500 crore (equivalent to ₹690 billion or US$7.3 billion in 2026).
  - 25 September 2025 — The agreement was signed one day prior to the retirement of MiG-21 on 26 September and was valued at ₹62,370 crore (equivalent to ₹660 billion or US$7.1 billion in 2026). (Note: The contract value excludes taxes) Along with related equipment, the 97 jets would consist of 29 twin-seaters and 68 fighters. The delivery is expected to start in 2027–2028 and conclude in the next six years. In comparison to the 2021 deal, this order will include 67 additional items and more than 64% indigenous content. These jets will incorporate control surface actuators, Swayam Raksha Kavach EW Suite, and Uttam AESA Radar. Around 40 components being imported for the 2021 deal are expected to be indigenised for the 97-jet contract.
  - October 2025 — HAL is expected to place an additional order for 113 F404 engines worth $1 billion this month. The contract signing was earlier expected in September.
  - 7 November 2025 — A contract for 113 F404 engines and the related support package, valued at about ₹8,870 crore (US$948 million), was signed. Delivery are scheduled to start in 2027 and will conclude by 2032.
  - Delivery schedule — As per a report by Moneycontrol on 19 November 2025, the first batch of eight Mark 1A aircraft is expected to be delivered within the next 24–36 months. Additionally, HAL plans to deliver three major tranche of 24 aircraft to be delivered following months 37, 49 and 61 with the final batch of 12 aircraft to be delivered between month 73 and 84. Hence, the delivery timeline is expected to end in late 2032.
  - 31 July 2026 — HAL placed an order for 122 Active Antenna Array Units and 121 Interface Frames for the Uttam AESA Radar with Astra Microwave Products Limited on 31 July 2026, for ₹2,205 crore (US$240 million).

=== Production lines ===
1. Bengaluru Plant I: HAL's first Tejas production line is situated at Bangalore near HAL Airport. The production line was set up at a cost of ₹1,556 crore (equivalent to ₹27 billion or US$290 million in 2026), with HAL holding 50% stake and the rest held by IAF and Navy. First serial production aircraft delivered in 2015 with production rate of 8 per year.
2. Bengaluru Plant II: In March 2017, Government of India sanctioned ₹1,381.04 crore (equivalent to ₹21 billion or US$230 million in 2026) for setting up an additional production line under Aircraft Division, HAL. This would increase the production capacity from 8 to 16. Production of sub-components like Front Fuselage, Centre Fuselage, Rear Fuselage, Wings were outsourced to private partners. The production plant was inaugurated by the Defence Minister, Rajnath Singh, on 2 February 2021.
3. Nashik Plant: On 5 April 2023, the then Defence Secretary, Giridhar Aramane, laid the foundation stone for a third production line at HAL, Nashik with an investment of over ₹150 crore (equivalent to ₹164 crore or US$17 million in 2026). This would bring the total production capacity from 16 to 24 aircraft annually. The production of aircraft at this plant would start from October 2024 with the first example then expected by the end of April 2025. The first Tejas Mk 1A took its first flight on 17 October 2024 after being inaugurated by the Defence Minister, Rajnath Singh.
  1. The facility is spread on 1,300,000 sq ft (120,000 m^{2}) and employs 30 structural assembly jigs for all major aircraft modules like the centre fuselage, front fuselage, rear fuselage, wings and air intake. The facility outsources 40% of its workshare to private firms and plans to enhance annual aircraft output to 10 in two years.
4. Nashik Plant II: HAL also plans to setup another production line at Nashik to ramp up production capacity from 24 to 32 as reported on 10 January 2025. The line can start production within one and a half years of sanction. The establishment of the plant is subject to a regular supply of GE engines.

=== Delivery ===
==== Mark 1 contracts ====
On 1 October 2014, LCA-SP1 aircraft took the first flight. On 17 January 2015, the aircraft was delivered to the Indian Air Force. Left head till then flow on 5 sorties to test various equipment. Due to delays in production the cost per aircraft rose from ₹120 crore (equivalent to ₹421 crore or US$45 million in 2026) in 2006 to ₹160 crore (equivalent to ₹263 crore or US$28 million in 2026) in 2015. However, the aircraft was not inducted into a squadron till 2016 until sufficient numbers were delivered by HAL. The aircraft would also require additional flight hours before induction. Expected delivery timeline was as follows: SP-2 in March, up to SP-5 by June, up to SP-8 by March 2016; completing a total of 8 aircraft.

The formation of the first Tejas-equipped squadron started in July 2011. No. 45 Squadron IAF (Flying Daggers), the first Tejas squadron, was operationalised in July 2016. It is based in Sulur Air Force Station, Coimbatore.

When the first order was placed in 2006, it was expected that ADA would receive Initial Operational Clearance (IOC) by 2008. Induction was scheduled by December 2011. However, IOC was originally received in December 2013 and the first IOC variant was delivered in FY2016-17.

As of 11 February 2019, 12 IOC aircraft were delivered with 4 due to be delivered by March 2019. Also, on 31 December 2018, ADA has handed over Drawing Applicability List (DAL) and Equipment Standard of Preparation (SOP) documents, for FOC configuration to HAL for production. The production and delivery of 8 Tejas Trainer would start after design clearance by ADA.

The second Tejas Mark 1 squadron, Squadron 18, was formed at Sulur on 27 May 2020.

The first front fuselage of Tejas Mk1 FOC aircraft for the second order was delivered by Dynamatic Technologies on 2 November 2020.

By August 2023, the delivery of all 32 single-seat Tejas Mk 1 aircraft (IOC and FOC) were completed.

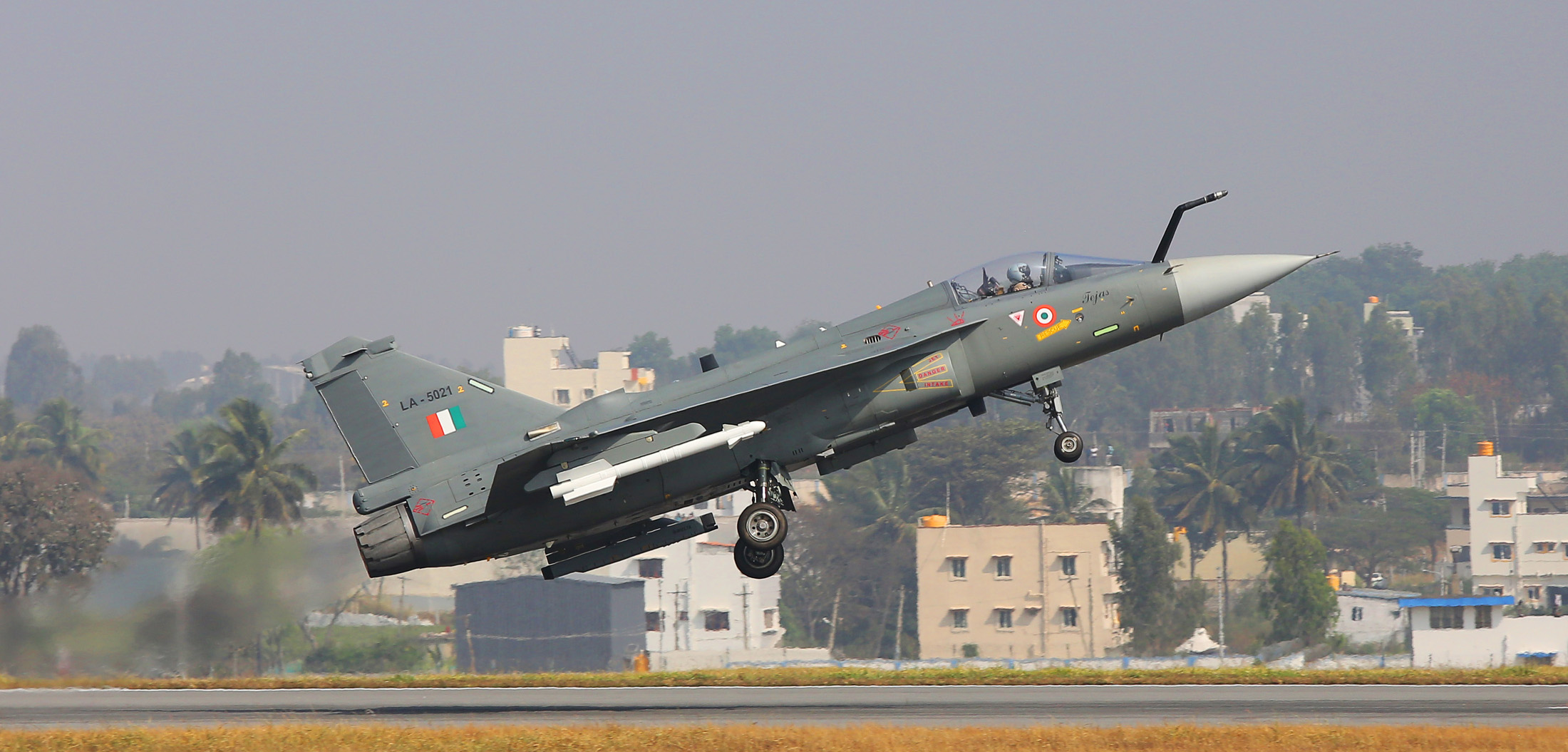
Tejas MK1 at Aero India 2025

The first series production trainer aircraft (LT5201) completed its maiden flight on 5 April 2023. IAF has received first LCA Tejas twin seater aircraft from HAL on 4 October 2023. Next trainer variant delivery expected by 31 March.

As of 18 September 2024, 4 trainer aircraft have been delivered to IAF while the rest of 4 are to be delivered by March 2025.

As of 10 January 2025, 38 of the 40 aircraft have been delivered and the last two trainers would be delivered soon. On 11 January 2025, the last of the 40 Tejas - LT-5208 - took its first flight.

As of 5 February 2025, the final two trainer aircraft remains undelivered since they are yet to meet the Air Service Qualitative Requirements (ASQRs) of the IAF. On 18 September 2026, the seventh and eighth trainers were delivered to the Indian Air Force which completed the first two Tejas orders placed in 2006 and 2010, respectively.

==== First Mark 1A contract delays ====
As of February 2021, three units of Tejas Mk 1A was to be delivered in the third year from contract signing (2024) followed by a production rate of 16 aircraft per year for five years, completing deliveries within eight years of contract signing. The first aircraft will have an indigenous content of 50% which will be elevated to 60% by the end of contract.

As of October 2022, the delivery date of the first aircraft was reportedly scheduled on 3 February 2024 with three aircraft to be delivered by 31 March. In December 2023, it was reported that the IAF has plans to raise the first squadron of Tejas Mark 1A at Nal Air Force Station. Later in June 2024, it was confirmed that No. 3 Squadron and No. 23 Squadron would be the first units to operate the Mk 1A variant replacing their in-service MiG 21s.

The delivery of F-404 engines, which were scheduled to begin from February 2024 have been delayed, due to supply chain issues, as claimed by GE. The delivery of the first aircraft itself was shifted to the end of March 2024. By then, the IAF's latest requests for software upgrades and minor design changes caused the delay in delivery timeline, according to sources within the military and defence establishment. Also, a number of certifications were pending. The delivery of essential components that were ordered from Israel, Russia and Ukraine have also been delayed due to the Russian invasion of Ukraine. All of which is impacting the production and delivery schedule.

In May 2024, the MoD asked HAL in May to deliver at least 18 Tejas Mk 1A by March 2025 and the entire 180 jets (including later 97 Tejas Mk 1A order) within 10 years. Subsequently, the delivery dates were shifted several times from February 2024 to July-end (as of May), to 15 August (as of July) and again to November (as of August).

In August, the first aircraft was undergoing critical flight tests with weapons trials to be expected soon while the second was in high speed taxi trials phase. The next 4 units were in advanced stages of production. HAL then planned to manufacture at least 14 airframes in "ready-to-go state" by the fiscal year in order to ensure swift engine integration and aircraft deliveries within few weeks after arrival of new engines.

Again, in September 2024, Denmark prohibited the export of engine charge amplifiers, previously installed on Tejas Mk 1, resulting in further delays of Tejas Mk 1A deliveries. Later, HAL assigned a Bengaluru-based company to indigenously develop the component which would then be tested before integration. This is a crucial component tasked to sense engine temperature and adjust operation accordingly.

The same month, a report suggested that the fighter aircraft's Israeli software integration being finished and is undergoing final trials and deliveries could begin from October 2024. The delivery could begin with Category B engines, referring to the engines previously used or procured from GE. The F404-IN20 engine delivery had been shifted to arrive in November 2024.

There was an additional problem for the delivery. General Electric had closed down the production line of F404-IN20 at Lynn, Massachusetts engines earlier without further prospects of orders from India and the first engine was yet to be delivered even in October 2024. First engine delivery dates were delayed to September 2024 as of then and followed by a production rate of two per month. By November, engine deliveries was delayed by 10 months. Engine deliveries were again shifted to April 2025 though uncertainties remained. The reason for delay was cited as supply chain issues since a South Korean firm with financial issues failed to deliver certain components of the engine. HAL had 5-6 aircraft ready for delivery. The Mk 1A is in the final stages of trials before delivery. Following the orders, a lengthy process of sorting out supply chain problems was undertaken and the F404 production line at Boston restarted by late 2024 to enable deliveries after a stagnation of 5 years. As of 10 January 2025, GE had a backlog of 26 engines.

As of late December, further critical trials of Tejas Mk 1A using Category B F404 engines were to commence in January 2025 as a part of a contingency plan. The new deadline for delivery of first aircraft was set for 31 March 2025. The older engines would be replaced once the new engines are delivered. The trials will also include Astra Mk1 beyond visual range air-to-air missiles (BVRAAM), EL/M-2052 and indigenous Electronic Warfare Suite (radar warning receiver and advanced self-protection jammer). The aircraft will be delivered after certain certifications are done.

As of 6 February 2025, HAL had three Tejas Mk 1A aircraft "ready in the flight line" with another two to be prepared by March–April. Deliveries were expected within few days after GE starts engine deliveries in March. Integration of EW Suite and radars was complete while trials of Astra missiles form these jets was expected soon. GE "promised" to deliver 12 engines in 2025-26 starting in March 2025 with 20 engines to be delivered from 2026-27 onwards. Tejas delivery rate will depend on the revised engine delivery schedules. Meanwhile, Nashik line is reportedly operational and the first Tejas Mk 1A is planned to roll out in one or two months. Secretary of Defence Production Sanjeev Kumar stated during Aero India's 2025 edition that Tejas' production line was stabilized, both with HAL and GE engines, and that Tejas' supply will follow the original plan starting in 2025–2026 when 16 to 24 jets would be delivered.

On 9 March 2025, the first rear fuselage for Tejas Mk 1A was delivered to HAL by Alpha Tocol Engineering Services. Also, 12 rear fuselages manufactured by HAL was also ready on production line.

As of 16 March 2025, the first Tejas Mk 1A from the Nashik (Ozar) production line is expected to be rolled out in April. On 22 March, a report confirmed that, after two years of delay, the General Electric was preparing to deliver the first engine by March-end from the contracted 99 GE F404-IN20 engines as it was undergoing flight tests in their testbed aircraft. Further, GE plans to deliver a total of 12 engines in 2025 followed by a steady rate of only 20 engines per year from 2026 onwards.

After a two-year delay from the anticipated timeframes, the first of 99 F404-IN20 engines was rolled out from GE's factory on 25 March 2025, signaling the start of deliveries. The engine will be further tested at the HAL plant when it arrives in India in April. HAL produced three aircraft in 2025, will receive twelve engines from GE, and plans to produce eleven more aircraft by the end of 2025.

As of 30 March, Tejas Mk 1A was undergoing extra firing and EW trials. Also, the first Tejas Mk 1A is expected to be delivered from Nashik facility in the first quarter of FY 2025–26 after the HAL gets physical possession of the first engine in India in early April. Tejas Mk 1A failed an Astra Mk1 trial during the trials.

On 30 May, the first centre fuselage by Hyderabad-based VEM Technologies for Tejas Mk 1A was delivered to HAL. Another assembly jig to manufacture the component has also been cleared. The centre fuselage of the aircraft is a semi-monocoque construction with both metallic and carbon fiber composite material. This was followed by the delivery of second centre fuselage on 4 September 2025. Each unit needs a total of 1,595 parts to be manufactured before they are assembled. HAL officials inspect every component at every stage of their production. The firm is scheduled to deliver a total of five fuselage units by year-end.

As of June 2025, the first aircraft is now expected to be delivered by the end of the month from the Nashik plant. Further, HAL chief revealed that the company has six jets ready on the production line, all of which are to be delivered to IAF by March 2026. Also, 12 engines in addition to the one delivered so far are expected to be delivered by General Electric to HAL within the same timeframe while the latter also expects to deliver 16 jets in fiscal year 2026-27 given that there is a steady engine supply from GE.

On 8 July, PK Mishra, principal secretary to the Prime Minister, visited the HAL's LCA Tejas Assembly Hangar and Aerospace Division to review the progress of the programme. Mishra was shown that six Tejas Mk 1A single-seat and two twin-seat trainer variants on the assembly line fitted with "some other test engines" which would be replaced by GE F404-IN20 engines when delivered. Additionally, the two new engines will reportedly arrive in the same month, as per reports. Meanwhile, Defence Secretary Rajesh Kumar Singh also confirmed that GE will deliver two engines per month from July 2025 to March 2026. The next engine is to be delivered by the end of the month. While HAL has limited Category B engines, these available engines are being rotated among new aircraft to conduct test flights.

On 13 July, it was reported that the second engine had been dispatched for delivery to HAL. The unit reached India on 14 July. Additionally, Larsen & Toubro (L&T) completed the construction of the first pair of private sector-manufactured wings. Reportedly, the official delivery was undertaken with a ceremony on 17 July at Precision Engineering & Systems Complex of Coimbatore, Tamil Nadu. Meanwhile, the three sections of the fuselage have been already delivered by the respective private sector counterparts. With almost the entire aero structure produced by private sector companies, HAL will remain the final integrator and will ensure the assembly, testing, and certification of Tejas at its Final Assembly Lines at Nashik and Bangalore. As reported on 28 July, the aircraft were moving towards its "next phase" and is ready to "roll out". The testing of Astra Mk1 BVRAAM is scheduled for early August 2025.

On 11 August, the Directorate General of Aeronautical Quality Assurance (DGAQA) approved the flight clearance for the Tejas Mk 1A aircraft produced by HAL's Nashik division. The Additional Director General, AQA, also formally handed over the Flight Clearance Document to the executive director of the Nashik division. The Office of the Additional Director General (OADG), a field establishment of DGAQA, in Nashik was also responsible for the Transfer of Technology of LCA Mk 1A to the Nashik division. As of 19 August, the first two of the jets were "fully ready" and their final weapons trial was due by September.

The third engine is scheduled to be delivered in August as per GE's revised delivery timeline of one engine per month, followed by two engines monthly from October onwards. However, GE missed its scheduled delivery of two units in the month and has committed to deliver three to five engineers by October.

As of 30 August, 10 airframes of Tejas Mk 1A are ready with 2 of them equipped with newly delivered engines, including one from the Nashik plant. As of now, both of them are expected to be delivered by September-end and it is only after the delivery of two aircraft that the contract of additional 97 Tejas Mk 1A would be signed. In early September, the dates were again pushed to October, still subject to the jets' weapons trials, including Astra missile, ASRAAM and laser-guided bomb trials, which is underway is completed in September itself.

The third engine to HAL was delivered on 11 September with another engine to be supplied by month end. An overall of 12 engines are to be delivered in this fiscal year. In the current year, the Nashik plant could prepare 3-4 aircraft with the numbers reaching 8 units from the following year. Also, the private sector supply chain will enhance HAL's annual production capacity by 6 aircraft to 30.

As of 16 September, there are overall 24 airframes in the production lines combined of which eight are ready for delivery while two have been integrated with the new engines. Seven further engines would be delivered to HAL this year followed by 20 units next year. The two aircraft began their weapons trials involving ASRAAM missiles in the country's eastern sector which will be followed by Astra trials. After the Astra firing from Tejas Mk 1A in late March failed, the DRDL was compelled to undertake certain software tweaks to address the shortcomings and HAL is now awaiting approval from CEMILAC's safety review board to continue with its trials. As of 25 September, it was reported that the deliveries could be delayed until the first quarter of 2026. This is because of the Air Force's mandate of accepting only fully ready fighter aircraft with four distinct validations including firing validation of specialised munitions, integration of Electronic Warfare suite among others. However, these validations is not complete yet.

As on 30 September, the maiden flight of the first aircraft from the Nashik plant is expected in October. On 1 October, the fourth engine was delivered to HAL. By 3 October, the weapons firing trials of the first two aircraft was completed, which included Astra and ASRAAM missiles trials, and were ready to be delivered following necessary certifications.

The third production line of Tejas Mk1A along with the second production line of HTT-40 at HAL's Nashik facility was inaugurated by the Defence Minister on 17 October, as was reported on 8 October. The preceding production lines of both aircraft is based in Bengaluru. The first Mark 1A (LA-5043) from the Nashik plant conducted its maiden flight and had already completed its assembly and pre-flight trials. A flying formation of Tejas, Su-30MKI and HTT-40 was exhibited on the occasion. The Mark 1A aircraft also received a water cannon salute. Additionally, the first aircraft was expected to be delivered in the last week of the month, along with the scheduled delivery of two engines within the month.

The delivery deadline was again delayed to March 2026. Several Air Force officials reportedly expects further delays of over six months as multiple checks and pre-delivery procedures are due. Although HAL was scheduled to deliver 10 Tejas Mk 1A aircraft to the Indian Air Force in FY2025-26, the numbers were revised to five in December 2025.

The second set of wings from Larsen & Toubro was delivered on 31 December 2025. The firm will supply four wing sets per annum which can be enhanced to 12 sets subject to demand.

The missile and firing trials are completed according to HAL chief as of 28 January 2026. The trials included two missile launches and release of a laser-guided bomb. The Air Staff Qualitative Requirements (ASQR) certification and operational clearances, which are mandatory before formal induction, are still due. The SQRs include flight envelope validation, avionics and sensor integration, electronic warfare performance, reliability and maintainability parameters and operational suitability checks. HAL will approach IAF to take the deliveries within the fiscal year. Thereafter, IAF will decide on its acceptance and handover details.

As of 4 February, 15 airframes are in ready configuration state and will be joined by 5 more within this fiscal year. However, the Indian Air Force will reportedly review the Tejas Mk 1A programme in May before deciding on the acceptance of delivery of these planes. A detailed discussion on the same was done in December 2025. On 5 February, HAL further clarified through a press release that while five aircraft, "incorporating major contracted capabilities" under the ASQR, are ready for deliveries, nine more have completed their first flights and awaits GE engine deliveries. Only five engines had been received and the design and development issues are being resolved in an "expedited manner". However, Business Standard reported that the firm has sought some relaxations on the ASQR to meet the March 2026 deadline for five jets. Hence, even if the jets are delivered within the deadline, they will lack full operational capabilities. If the requests are partially agreed to, the delays might extend to May, or even June–July if all the ASQR are to be met. The IAF has raised a list of operational and safety issues that needs to be sorted before acceptance of deliveries. One of the operational issue was the simultaneous functioning of the radar with the other systems including the electronic warfare suite.

On the first week of February, reports emerged revealing the post-coupling of 19th LCA Mk1A (LA-5051) have been completed and the airframe has been rolled out.

As reported on 21 February, the IAF has laid down a list of essentials before accepting the aircraft, however, it has agreed to some exemption of the contractual obligations after consulting with the defence ministry. This implied that the jets will incorporate some systems even after delivery. The essentials included the final missile firing trial, certification, full integration of radar and EW systems and the complete weapons package. HAL received the list of essential tasks in a meeting with IAF which it agreed to complete by April and followed by a few weeks-long acceptance trial by the IAF. The delivery dates were shifted to the new fiscal year.

On 1 April 2026, it was reported that a critical programme review would be undertaken by the IAF and HAL. In the process, the IAF would take an update of the progress and finalise a revised delivery schedule. Officials from HAL and the IAF would meet in New Delhi. The outcome of the review would be decisive. If the programme was "sufficiently on track" the deliveries would be taken within two to three months, otherwise there would be further slippages. The five aircraft deemed to be ready by HAL had only "major" contracted capabilities incorporated and multiple contracted capabilities, including the mandatory ones, are yet to be certified.

Meanwhile, GE is expected to deliver the sixth engine, which is ready, to HAL by month-end and another 20 units between June and December 2026. Hence, there would be six Tejas Mk1A with Cat-A engines by April-end. Twenty Tejas Mk1A airframes has also kept ready. Delivery would begin when ASRAAM trials are completed in the required configuration and some radar software upgrades. HAL is also implementing the contractual penalties on GE, in the form of liquidated damages, for every delay in engine deliveries under a provision stated in the contract. GE has also reportedly assured deliveries of over 20 engines from 2027.

The critical programme review was yet to be held as per an 11 May report. The meeting at New Delhi would see participation of senior IAF and HAL officials to assess progress on mandatory operational benchmarks before service induction and finalise revised programme delivery timelines. The delay was because the meeting was contingent on HAL updating the IAF on progress in resolving pending technical issues which was due. The programme review was pushed to June without a firm date with the deliveries were delayed to August–September. This was announced by HAL on 15 May. Even though IAF was willing to accept further relaxation to capability inclusion, the MoD would need to implement some tweaks in the contract.

Key challenges include seamless integration of the AESA radar, electronic warfare suite and mission systems through the aircraft’s mission computer network. Additional testing, software corrections, missile firing trials and full weapons package validation are still required before full operational clearance. IAF is also willing to accept aircraft deliveries even if some electronic warfare automation targets remain incomplete, provided full capability is delivered later. Pilots can temporarily perform such functions manually, as was common in earlier-generation aircraft.

The programme review meeting was conducted on 8 June 2026. All defence projects of HAL were reviewed with special emphasis on LCA Mk1A and the firm was asked to strictly adhere to timelines. The defence ministry is also examining a potential financial penalty for the delays. So far, 18 Mk1A airframes have been prepared and six engines have been delivered. The ministry expects 18 to 24 LCA Mk1A to be ready for delivery by year-end under the production and readiness schedule if the remaining ASQR are met. On 26 June, IAF was expected to make further exemptions on mandatory capabilities to expedite deliveries. Meanwhile, HAL was expected to solve remaining integration problems involving its AESA radar. The MoD is also examining a move to impose a financial penalty on HAL for the delays. GE delivered the seventh engine on 13 July.

In August 2026, three engines were delivered by GE, taking the total deliveries to 10 units. In September 2026, the deliveries are expected to commence in December with 10 aircraft to be delivered in fiscal year 2026-27. By then, construction, maiden flight and tests of 27 airframe has been completed; while issues regarding radar integration are being resolved with final weapons trials and some tests related to confirming standards are pending. Air Marshal Ashutosh Dixit, the Vice Chief of the Air Staff, also confirmed that the jets are undergoing flight & systems trials to validate final two to three technical parameters are left related to a software integration problem which could be solved within one or two months. A report form The New Indian Express stated that the IAF would only accept aircraft when the ASQR is fully met. The issue is to integrate and synchronise the AESA radar with the electronic warfare (EW) suite and other onboard mission softwares via the mission computer network. Some of the final parameters are undergoing refinement and validation.

== Operational history ==
The Tejas Mark 1 made its international debut on 21 January 2016, at the fourth Bahrain International Airshow.

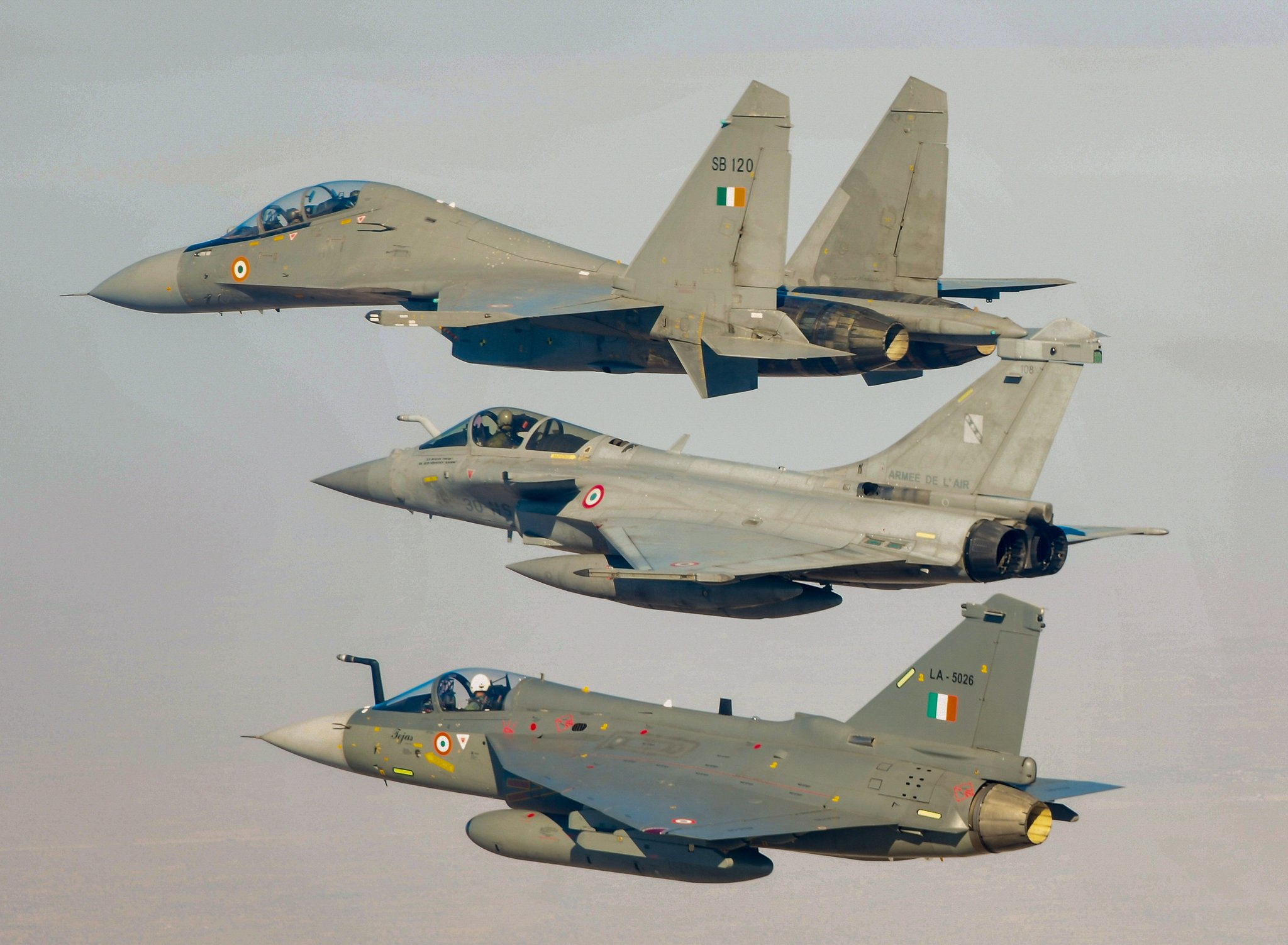
IAF Su-30 MKI, French Rafale, IAF Tejas FOC during Exercise Garuda VII

On 26 January 2017, Tejas made its maiden appearance in the 68th Republic Day parade by joining in the fly-past over the Kartavya Path (then Rajpath) in New Delhi.

In April 2018, the IAF's entire fleet of Tejas Mark 1 aircraft participated in the Gagan Shakti 2018 exercise. It was the IAF's largest air exercise, involving 1,100 aircraft and 15,000 military personnel. During the exercise, the Tejas were deployed to forward bases and demonstrated their reliability and precision strike capability. In 2019, six Tejas fighter jets participated in the Vayu Shakti air exercise, where it has demonstrated its "swing role" capability.

According to the commanding officer of No. 45 Squadron – Group Captain Samrath Dhankhar, DASH IV HMDS enables the Tejas pilot to take full advantage of high off-boresight close combat missiles, such as Python-5 and R-73.

On 18 August 2020, IAF deployed the No. 45 Squadron "Flying Dagger" on the western front along the Pakistani border (line of control). It was the first operational deployment of Tejas.

On 27 April 2021, Tejas Mark 1 successfully test fired Python-5 high off-boresight (HOBS) close combat air-to-air missile and further validated enhanced capability of I-Derby ER (extended range) BVR missile. Both missiles scored direct hits on targets during the trial. IAF participated in Exercise Desert Flag VIII, with five Tejas and two C-17 Globemaster III aircraft, held in UAE from 27 February to 17 March 2023. This is the first time Tejas participated in an international flying exercise outside India.

Tejas LSP-7 firing Astra Mk1 missile

On 23 August 2023, Astra Mk-1 Beyond Visual Range air-to-air missile was successfully test fired from HAL Tejas aircraft off the coast of Goa from an altitude of 20,000 ft (6.1 km). This is the first time when India test fire an indigenously developed BVRAAM from a homegrown fighter aircraft.

In December 2023, plans were revealed to deploy the first batch of Tejas Mk 1A in the Nal airbase in Bikaner, Rajasthan. No. 3 Squadron and No. 23 Squadron, the last and current operators of MiG-21s, are expected to become the first operators of Tejas Mk 1A. Both the squadrons were deployed in Nal AFS by June 2024. The first delivery of Tejas Mk 1A is expected by November 2024.

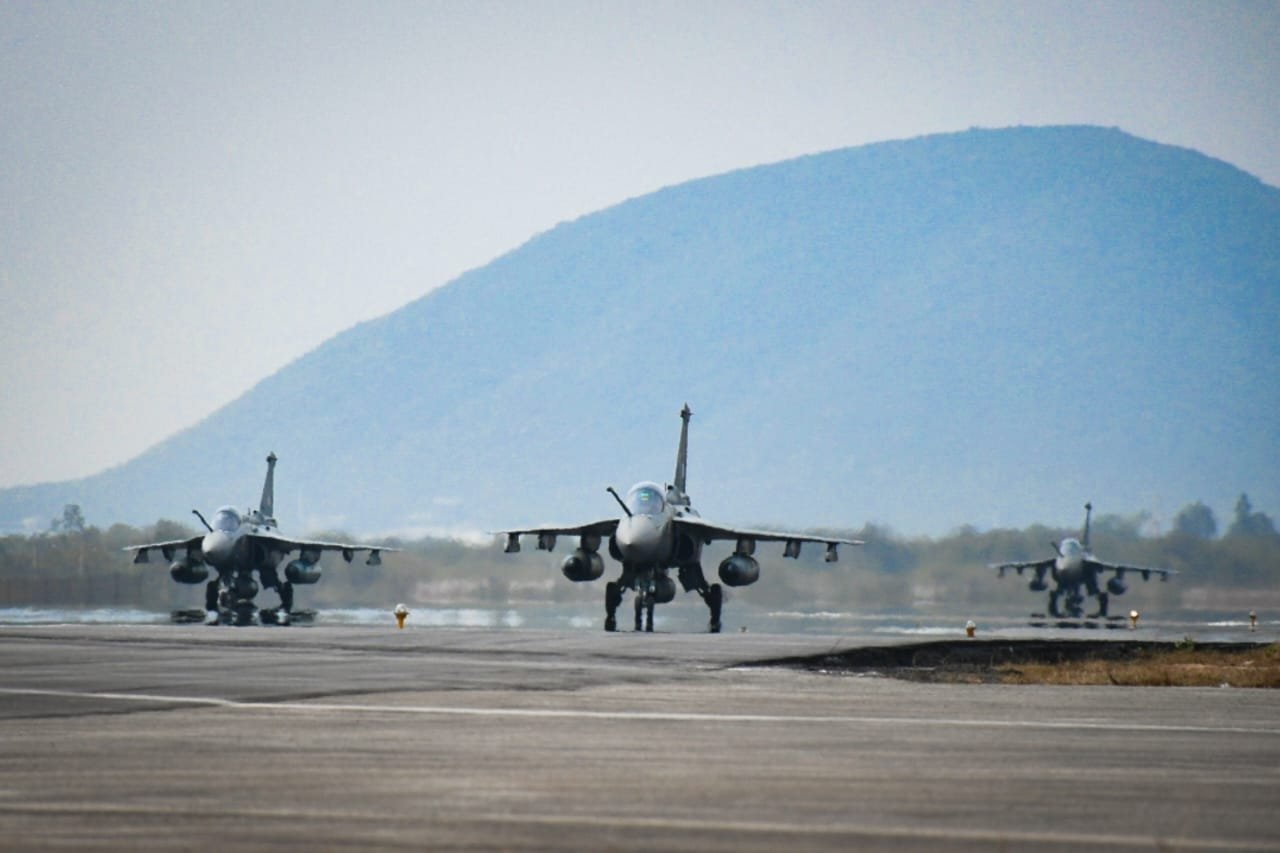
No. 18 Squadron IAF at INS Dega for Milan Naval Exercise 2024

On 26 January 2024, on the occasion of 75th Republic Day of India, four Tejas took part in the parade fly-past held at Kartavya Path, New Delhi.

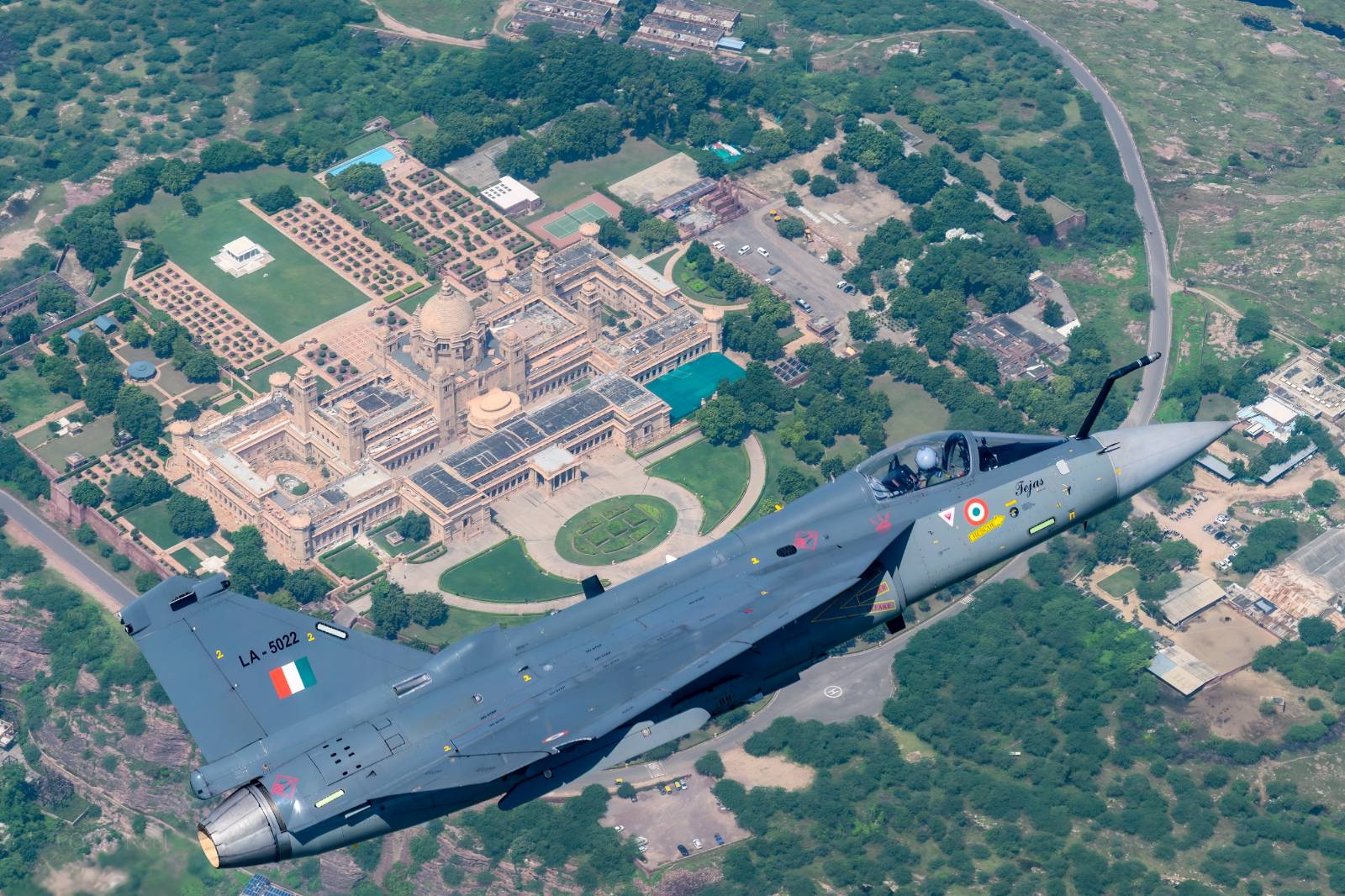
Tejas (LA-5022) of Squadron No. 18 piloted by VCOAS AP Singh during Exercise Tarang Shakti 2024

HAL Tejas Mk 1 participated in the first phase of Exercise Tarang Shakti 2024. The jets were escorted by a formation of four HAL Tejas Mk 1 aircraft, one of which was piloted by the then Vice Chief of the Air Staff, Air Marshal Amar Preet Singh. The exercise began with Tejas intercepting German, French and Spanish jets as a part of the training exercise. HAL Tejas was assigned to the Red Force (hostile) as well as the Blue Force (friendly) and its capabilities were proved in both the cases. The jet also received appreciation from the foreign pilots who piloted them. On 13 August, the Chief of French Air Force, General Stéphane Mille and the Chief of German Air Force Lieutenant General Ingo Gerhartz piloted HAL Tejas.

The first production aircraft of Tejas Mk 1A was showcased at Aero India 2025.

On 12 March 2025, Astra Mk-1 Beyond Visual Range air-to-air missile was successfully test fired from a Tejas Mk1 prototype over the Integrated Test Range, Chandipur, Odisha. The missile scored a direct hit on a flying target at a range of over 100 km. This test was significant for the subsequent induction of Tejas Mk 1A aircraft. Further trials are also expected for performance evaluation.

The aircraft did not participate in Exercise Vayushakti on 27 February 2026 due to the fleet's grounding in the month following a take-off incident.

Tejas was part of the IAF contingent in Exercise Veer Guardian which was conducted on 9–22 September 2026 at Jodhpur Air Force Station. The Chief of the Air Staff, Air Chief Marshal Amar Preet Singh, and the JASDF chief, General Takehiro Morita, conducted their respective solo sorties on Tejas simultaneously on 20 September.

== Potential operators ==
HAL proposed exporting the Tejas, with preliminary talks taking place with several friendly countries. It was reported in March 2020 that HAL is willing to set up logistic facilities in Indonesia, Malaysia, Sri Lanka and Vietnam as part of exporting the Tejas.

In a July 2026 interview, Hindustan Aeronautics Limited (HAL) Chairman and Managing Director Ravi K. said in an interview that domestic production is being prioritized with local capacity and ecosystem being worked on to fulfill domestic orders before export orders will be done.

=== Brazil ===
In September 2024, the Brazilian Air Force (FAB) has reportedly considered the adoption of the Tejas to replace their AMX and Northrop F-5 jets in service and complement the Saab JAS 39 Gripen, which is being done with a swap of Embraer C-390 Millennium. FAB wanted to acquire F-16 Fighting Falcon at first from the US, but it was rejected.

According to the FAB, the AMX is due to be retired by 2025 with the F-5s being next by 2030. In November 2024, Brazil offered to India a swap between the C-390 Millennium and the HAL Tejas, to replace the older F-5s in operation. In December 2024, an Indian delegation visited Brazil to negotiate the deal. It was reported in Brazilian media that talks on getting the Tejas are in advanced stages.

The FAB is also looking into the Rafale to replace their AMX jets.

A decision is expected before the end of 2026.

=== DR Congo ===
In October 2024, a report suggested that the Air Force of the Democratic Republic of the Congo (FAC) was interested to acquire HAL Tejas. It was reported in August 2024 that a FAC delegation visited India to speak with HAL representatives about the Tejas.

The FAC plans to replace their Sukhoi Su-25s with the Tejas if purchased.

=== Failed bids ===
==== Argentina ====
The Argentine Air Force had indicated its interest in possibly purchasing the Tejas, as part of its modernization initiative. HAL had offered the Tejas to Argentina, amidst other offers of the JF-17 from China and the MiG-35 from Russia. Multiple sources had also indicated that the Tejas may likely be a good option for Argentina.

However, any potential sale of the Tejas to Argentina may likely be threatened by British imposed arms sanctions, since the Tejas utilizes the British Martin-Baker MK16 IN16 GS Tejas ejection seat, along with other British-origin components — including an aerial-refueling probe and a quartz radome, both supplied by Cobham Limited. The UK has barred any sale of military equipment consisting of British-manufactured parts to Argentina ever since the 1982 Falklands War. Argentina's previous efforts to procure modern fighter aircraft, including the Mirage F1M, the IAI Kfir, the JAS 39 Gripen and the KAI FA-50 were scuttled due to British diplomatic pressure, since the aforementioned aircraft were found to contain UK-origin parts.

Given the nature of the Argentine-specific sanctions, the Tejas would essentially be subject to UK-scrutiny. Nevertheless, HAL reportedly stated multiple times that they are willing to accommodate Argentinian requests to retrofit the Tejas, and had offered a customised-variant of the Tejas which replaces around 50-specific components and the substitutes all major British-origin components with diplomatically suitable non-British alternatives, including possibly substituting the ejection seat with one indigenously developed and manufactured in India. However, any customisation to the HAL Tejas would encompass considerable changes to the aircraft's design and additional flight certification. Subsequently, there were indications that the Argentines were willing to look at the JF-17 because of concerns that the time and money required to modify the Tejas to remove non-British parts was beyond what Buenos Aires was willing to spend.

In December 2022, the Argentine government decided to abandon the decision to acquire new fighter aircraft. With President Alberto Fernandez stating in an interview that "Argentina has to allocate its resources to more important things than the purchase of military aircraft. We are in a very unequal continent, but there are no war problems and unity among countries is sought." In July 2023, Argentine newspaper La Nacion reported that Tejas had been eliminated, with the remaining options being second-hand Danish F-16 fighters or Chinese-Pakistani JF-17s, both which the bidding selection board deemed more advantageous. In March 2024, Denmark agreed to the purchase of 24 Danish F-16s by Argentina.

==== Australia ====
In July 2020, the Royal Australian Air Force (RAAF) had issued a tender, seeking a new jet trainer to replace its fleet of BAE Hawk 127 trainer aircraft. According to HAL's "58th Annual Report" covering 2020–2021, HAL had offered the HAL Tejas in its "Lead in Fighter Trainer" (LIFT) configuration to Australia's Department of Defence (DoD) in July 2020. Other aircraft also reported to be participating in the tender were the Boeing-Saab T-7 Red Hawk, the Aermacchi M-346 Master and the KAI T-50.

However, the Australian Government rejected a government to government deal proposed by the Indian government for 35 Tejas LIFT aircraft for US$1 billion. During bilateral defence talks held in September 2021, The Indian Express reported Australia's lack of interest in the offer. In February 2022, the Australian government decided to take up a proposal by BAE to upgrade and refurbish its Hawks with new engines and avionics, extending their lifespan until 2032.

==== Botswana ====
The Botswana Defence Force Air Wing had approached HAL to procure the Tejas for potentially replacing its Canadair CF-5s due to the aircraft's age and problems of acquiring needed parts for maintenance. The BDFAW had previously considered acquiring Gripens, the F-16, KAI T-50, and the Leonardo M-346.

As of July 2024, there were reports that talks on acquiring the Tejas were suspended. In January 2025, Botswana officially ended negotiations to purchase the Tejas.

==== Egypt ====
During the Dubai Airshow 2021, Egyptian officials expressed their interest in procuring 70 LCA Tejas to replace 100 Hongdu JL-8s. Following the Dubai Airshow 2021, HAL and Indian Air Force officials visited Cairo and discussions were going on. As of June 2022, India has offered to set up local production facilities for the LCA Tejas and also for the Light Utility and Light Combat Helicopters in Egypt.

During Aero India 2023, it was reported that Egypt was seeking around 20 multi-role aircraft. HAL previously reported that 35 LCA Mk-1As were being offered in a contract. In August 2024, it was reported that an agreement to purchase the Chinese Chengdu J-10C, had been signed.

==== Malaysia ====
Malaysia had frequently indicated that it may be interested in purchasing the HAL Tejas for the Royal Malaysian Air Force (RMAF), as part of its attempts to supplement its MiG-29 fleet; reports of Malaysian interest in procuring the aircraft date back to as early as 2019.

In March 2019, the HAL Tejas made its international debut at the Langkawi International Maritime and Aerospace Exhibition (LIMA); its presence reportedly generated a great deal of interest, especially by the RMAF. However, in mid-2019, HAL's prospects of exporting the HAL Tejas to Malaysia were severely blemished, owing to diplomatic tussles between India and Malaysia. After the diplomatic skirmishes had ceased in 2020, an RMAF delegation reportedly visited HAL's manufacturing-facility at Bangalore in 2021, to assess the suitability of the HAL Tejas. Possibly in anticipation of a potential order — reaffirming Malaysia's interest in the aircraft.

In 2021, the RMAF formally released a tender and request for proposals for the supply of 18 light combat-aircraft - labelled as the "Fighter Lead In Trainer-Light Combat Aircraft" (FLIT/LCA), in an effort to supplant its ageing BAE Hawk 108/208 light-combat aircraft and its MB-339CM trainers. Six aircraft were running in the bid for the FLIT/LCA tender — the HAL Tejas MK1A, KAI FA-50, HAIC L-15, Aermacchi M-346, TAI Hürjet and Mikoyan MiG-35. Coincidentally, the JF-17 — which was reported to be a leading choice for the RMAF, did not participate in the FLIT/LCA tender.

In February 2023, the Malaysian government announced that the South Korean bid had won the tender with the Tejas failing to win the contract. Malaysia subsequently ordered 18 KAI FA-50 Block 20 aircraft worth US$920 million. The FA-50 was reportedly chosen because of it being a tried-and-tested platform in service with numerous countries while the Tejas is largely unproven and untested, with the Indian Air Force being the sole operator. Logistics issues and the FA-50 better meeting the RMAF's FLIT/LCA requirements were also other factors.

==== Nigeria ====
On 7 December 2023, HAL reported that Nigeria has expressed interest in acquiring the Tejas. It was reportedly in competition with the JF-17. However, in July 2024, there were reports that talks on acquiring the Tejas were suspended. In January 2025, Nigeria withdrew from negotiations to purchase the Tejas. Nigeria instead bought JF 17 from Pakistan which were delivered in 2021.

==== Philippines ====
In May 2022, India and the Philippines signed an MOU with the Philippine Aerospace Development Corporation, which mentioned the consideration of purchasing the Tejas and other Indian-made aircraft. On 7 July 2022, the Tejas was dropped from further consideration from the multi-role fighter jet (MRF) project. The F-16V Block 70/72 and the JAS-39 Gripen C/D+ are currently the main contenders for the Philippine Air Force's MRF project.

In February 2024, HAL reported that it has offered the Tejas Mark 1A to the PADC as a naval strike platform, equipped with the BrahMos NG missile. HAL also agreed to help set up a local partnership for the assembly of the MK1A.

==== Sri Lanka ====
In 2018, it had been reported that Sri Lanka had shown interest in purchasing the Tejas to replace its aging fleets of IAI Kfir and Chengdu J-7 aircraft. The intention was for the acquisition of 8 to 12 aircraft to be pursued through a government-government basic agreement.

In 2021, the Sri Lankan government decided to overhaul their Kfirs instead rather than buying new aircraft, which would cost around $40 million per unit compared to $49 million in total for overhauling all five Kfirs.

==== United Arab Emirates ====
The Tejas had attracted interest from the United Arab Emirates (UAE), with some discussions held during a visit by UAE Minister of State and Defence, Mohammed Ahmed Al Bowardi Al Falacy, during a state visit in October 2018, as part of growing defence relations between India and UAE. By May 2022, Tejas had failed to gain any further interest with the UAE placing an order for 80 Rafale F4s from France.

In February 2023, the UAE signed a deal for purchase of 12 Hongdu L-15 trainer and light combat aircraft from China, with options for another 36. UAE officials stated the L-15 order aligned with the UAE's framework for diversifying the military's sources of equipment.

==== United States ====
In December 2020, in response to a Request for Information (RFI) from the United States Naval Air Systems Command (NAVAIR), HAL offered the "Lead In Fighter Trainer" variant of the HAL Tejas — classified as the "HAL Tejas LIFT", to the United States Navy (USN), as part the latter's initiative to replace its fleet of T-45 Goshawk trainer aircraft, dubbed the "Undergraduate Jet Training System". Other aircraft participating in the UJTS, are the T-7 Red Hawk — offered by Boeing in partnership with Saab, and the KAI T-50A Golden Eagle — offered by Korea Aerospace Industries (KAI), in partnership with Lockheed Martin.

Despite being the only aircraft among the three to be reportedly capable of undertaking operations from an aircraft carrier, the prospects of the USN selecting the HAL Tejas LIFT are reportedly slim, according to multiple sources. Several reasons suggested as the cause of the LIFT's bleak prospects in the UJTS are that HAL has refrained from partnering with a US-based company to offer the LIFT (unlike the consortiums of Boeing-Saab and KAI-Lockheed Martin, offering the T-7 and the T-50A, respectively), a lack of export orders for the type, and its delta-wing design — which makes it less-suitable for low-speed landing.

== Variants ==
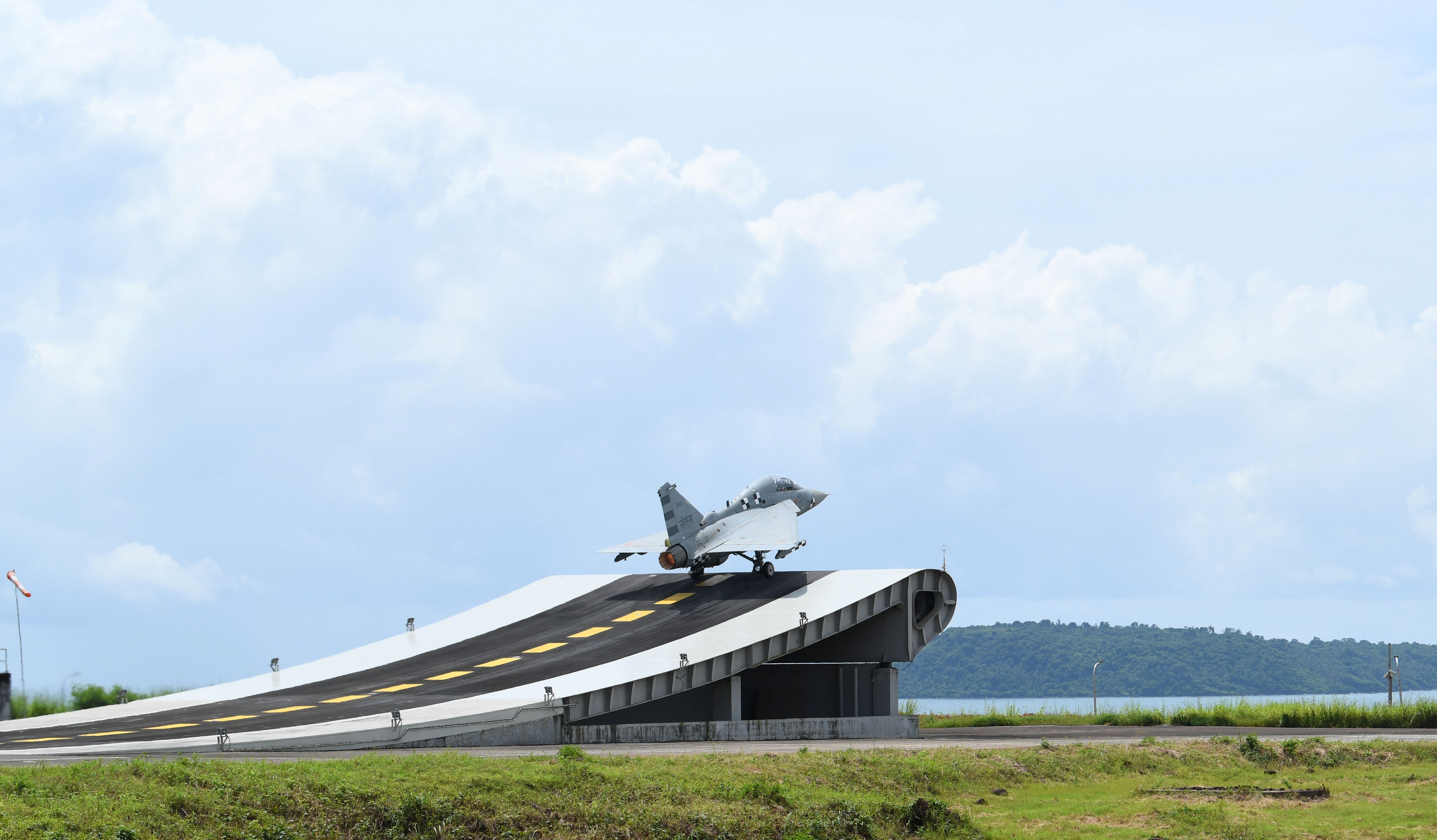
Ski-jump takeoff of by Tejas NP-2 at INS Hansa

=== Prototypes ===
Aircraft already built and projected models to be built. Model designations, tail numbers and dates of first flight are shown.

Technology Demonstrators (TD)

- TD-1 (KH2001) – 4 January 2001.
- TD-2 (KH2002) – 6 June 2002.

Prototype Vehicles (PV)

- PV-1 (KH2003) – First flight on 25 November 2003.
- PV-2 (KH2004) – First flight on 1 December 2005.
- PV-3 (KH2005) – First flight on 1 December 2006.
- PV-5 (KH-T2009) – First flight on 26 November 2009 – Fighter/Trainer variant.
- PV-6 (KH-T2010) – First flight on 8 November 2014 – Fighter/Trainer variant.

Naval Prototypes (NP)

- NP-1 (KHN-T3001) – Two-seat naval variant for carrier operations. Rolled out in July 2010. NP-1 made its first flight on 27 April 2012.
- NP-2 (NAVY3002) – Single-seat naval variant. First flight on 7 February 2015 with ski-jump take-off and arrested landing required in STOBAR carrier.
- NP-5 (NAVY3005) – Two-seat naval variant. First flight on 29 August 2023. Built to production standard incorporating improvements learned from NP-1 and NP-2. It will help in the development of HAL TEDBF.

Limited Series Production (LSP) aircraft

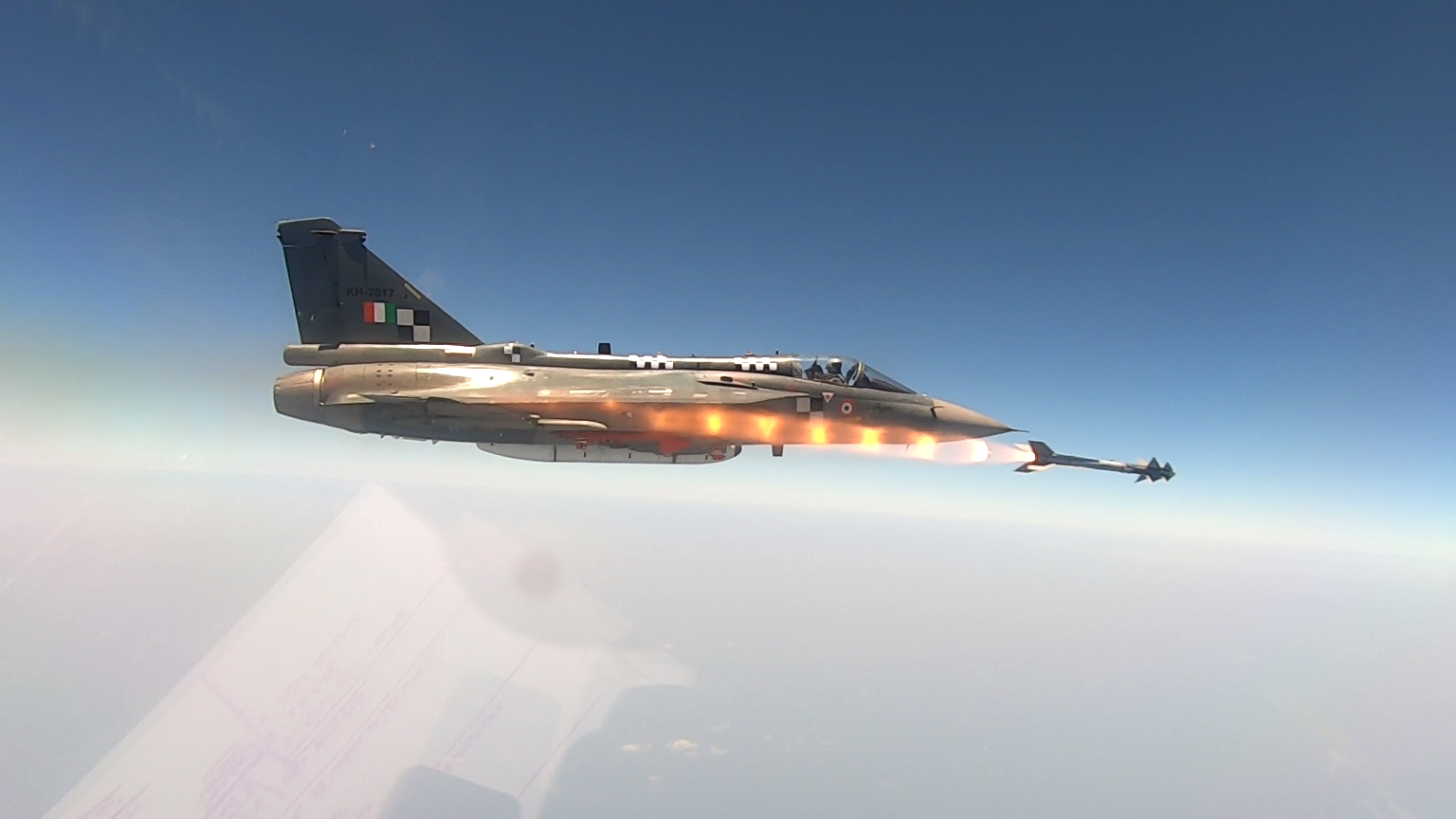
Tejas LSP-7 (KH2017) firing Python-5.

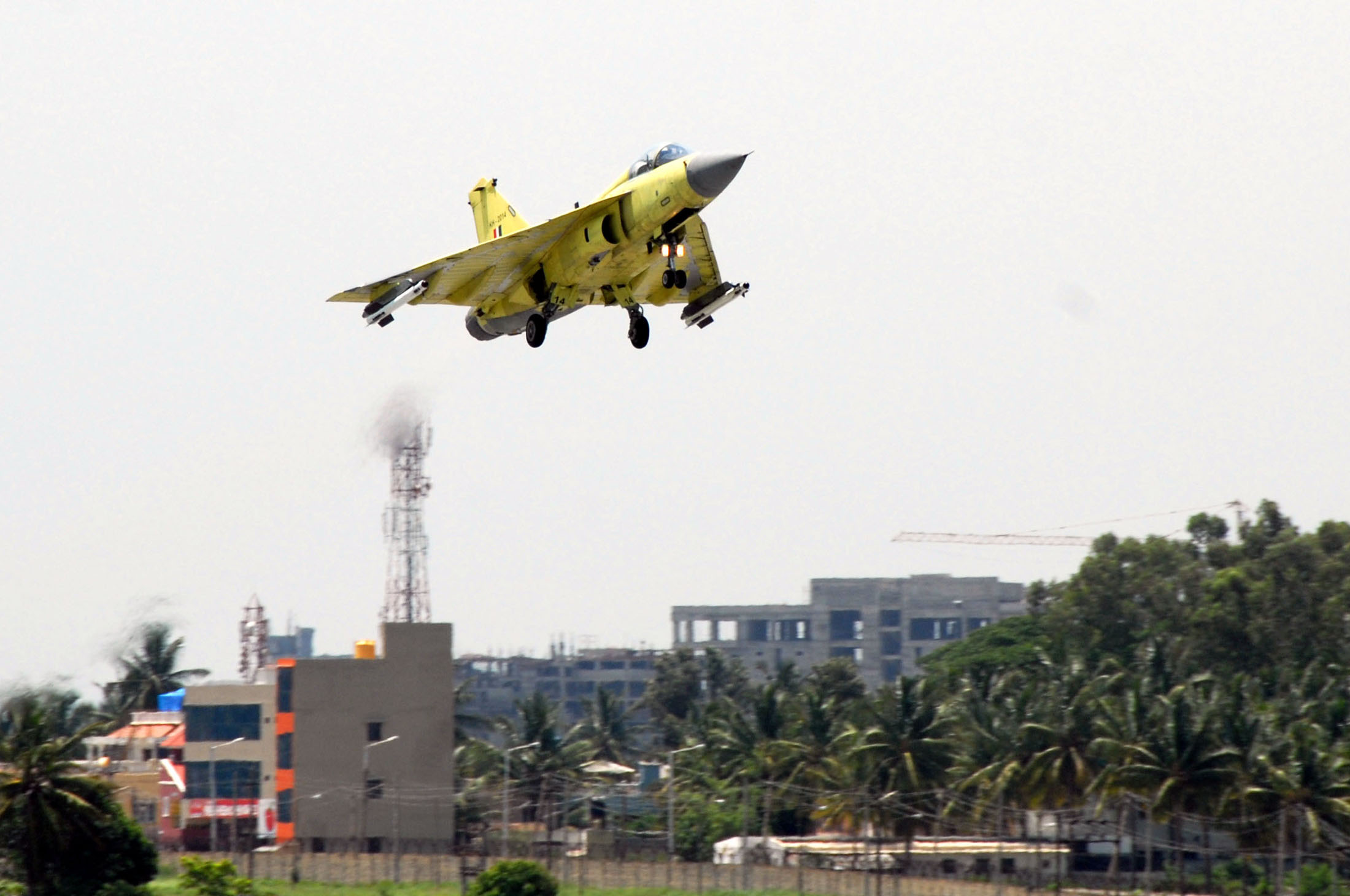
LCA LSP-4 on its maiden test flight

- LSP-1 (KH2011) – 25 April 2007. This LCA is powered by F404-F2J3 Engine.
- LSP-2 (KH2012) – 16 June 2008. This is the first LCA fitted with F404-IN20 engine.
- LSP-3 (KH2013) – 23 April 2010. The first aircraft to have the Hybrid MMR radar and will be close to the IOC standard.
- LSP-4 (KH2014) – June 2010. The first aircraft that was flown in the (Mark 1) configuration that will be delivered to the Indian Air Force. The aircraft flew with the Hybrid MMR, a Countermeasure Dispensing System, and an identify friend or foe electronic system.
- LSP-5 (KH2015) – 19 November 2010. IOC standard, with all sensors including night lighting in the cockpit, and an auto-pilot.
- LSP-7 (KH2017) – First flight on 9 March 2012.
- LSP-8 (KH2018) – First flight trial completed in March 2013. LSP 8 is the final version upon which production is based.

=== Production variants ===
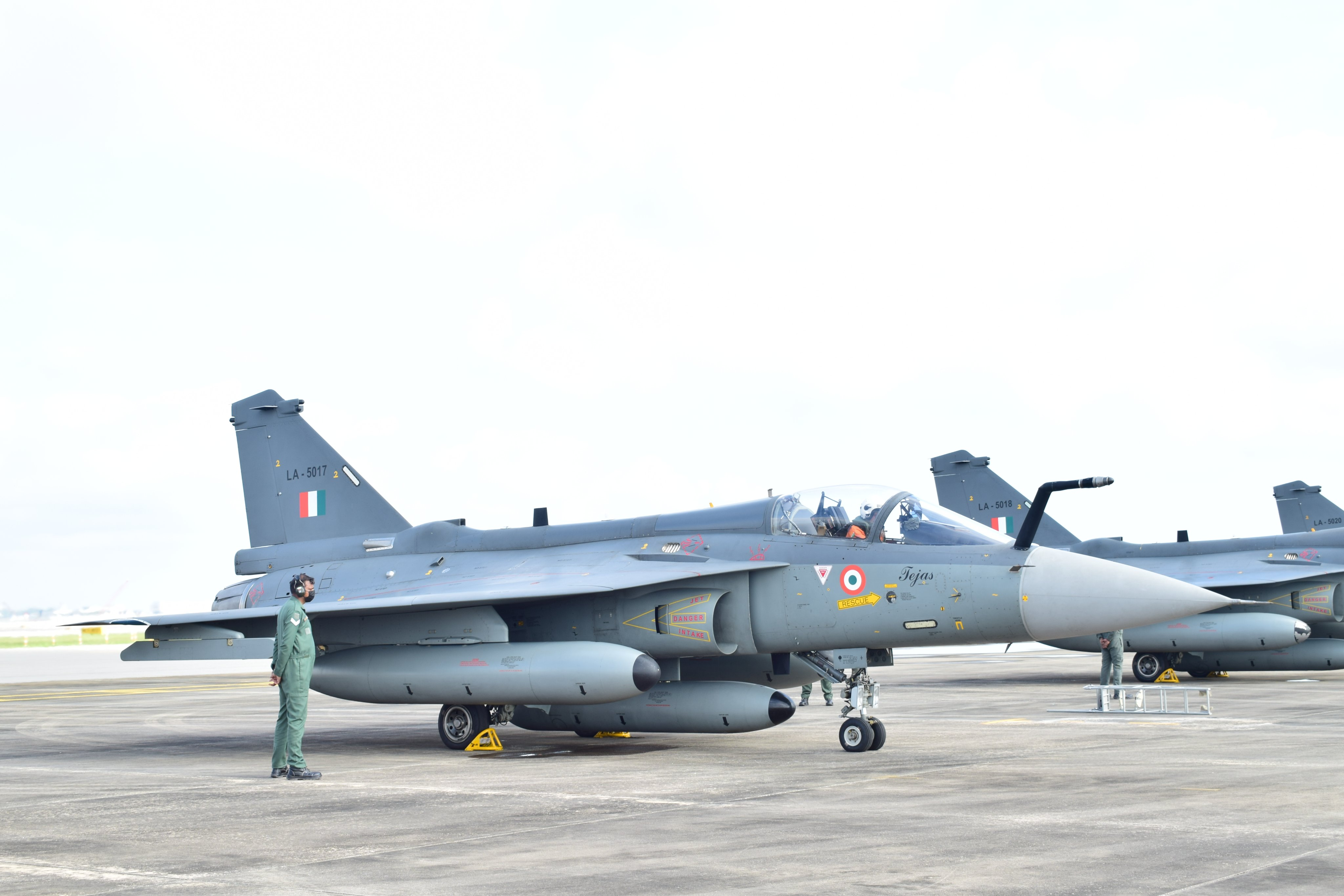
HAL Tejas MK1 FOC at the 2022 Singapore Airshow

- Tejas Mark 1 IOC − Single-seat operational variant for the Indian Air Force. 16 aircraft have been delivered in IOC standard constituting No. 45 Squadron IAF.
- Tejas Mark 1 FOC −Adding a Cobham refuelling pod and Gryazev-Shipunov GSh-23 auto-cannon, to the IOC specification. Delivery of the Tejas Mark 1 in FOC standard has begun and 18 Squadron (Flying Bullets) was equipped with the first aircraft in May 2020. FOC standard Tejas Mark 1 are BVRAAM capable, with general flight envelope expansion, increased angle of attack, higher g-limit of +9 g, updated avionics and flight control software suite, as well as capable of hot refueling and aerial refueling. Delivery of all 32 single seat Tejas Mk 1 aircraft is complete.
- Tejas Trainer − Two-seat operational conversion trainer for the Indian Air Force; also act as LiFT (Lead-in Fighter Trainer) and ground-attack aircraft.
- Tejas Mark 1A − An enhanced Tejas Mark 1 equipped with EL/M-2052 and Uttam AESA radar, self-protection jammer, radar warning receiver, as well as being able to mount an external ECM pod. The first Limited Series Production (LSP) aircraft of the Mark.1A variant rolled out in April 2022, and meant to be used as a Flying Testbed (FTB). A second LSP rolled out in late 2022, and shall be used to validate design changes meant to make the Mark.1A variant lighter than the Mark.1, and to optimize weight distribution.

=== Future developments ===
- SPORT - Supersonic Omni-Role Trainer (SPORT) aircraft is a two-seater Lead-in Fighter Training (LiFT) aircraft being developed from the LCA Trainer Mark 1. It is being offered to the IAF in lieu of the HAL HLFT-42 concept, and will be powered by the dry-thrust variant of the GTRE GTX-35VS Kaveri being developed for the DRDO Ghatak. It might also be offered for export purposes as a light fighter.
- Tejas Mark 2 - or Medium Weight Fighter, is an enhanced Tejas Mark 1 design which is expected to have a more powerful engine and an increased payload carrying capacity. The Tejas Mark 2 will feature an AESA radar, an on-board oxygen generation system and a built-in electronic warfare suite among other improvements to avionics. In January 2019, Air Chief Marshal Birender Singh Dhanoa said that the IAF has committed to procure twelve squadrons of Tejas Mark 2 aircraft.
- CATS MAX - The main component of HAL Combat Air Teaming System (CATS), CATS MAX will be a twin seater Tejas Mark 1A modified with CATS interface to act as the mothership of CATS components. The CATS MAX is to be crewed by a pilot and a weapon system officer (WSO), with the later controlling the CATS.
- Tejas Trainer - NP-5 based operational conversion trainer for the Indian Navy, with IFR-probe. Indian Navy was reported to be considering HAL's proposal to reestablish a "Carrier Training Squadron" with 18 Naval Tejas, that would be posted on both of India's carriers and additionally serve as point defence interceptors.

=== Cancelled variants ===
- Tejas Mark 1 Navy - Naval Variant based on HAL Tejas Mark 1 powered by F404 engine. Cancelled in favour of the new twin-engine naval fighter HAL TEDBF.
- Tejas Mark 2 Navy - Proposed naval variant based on the Tejas Mk 2. Cancelled in favour of the HAL TEDBF.
- Tejas Trainer IN - Two-seat operational conversion trainer for the Indian Navy. Cancelled in favour of the HAL TEDBF.

=== Gallery ===
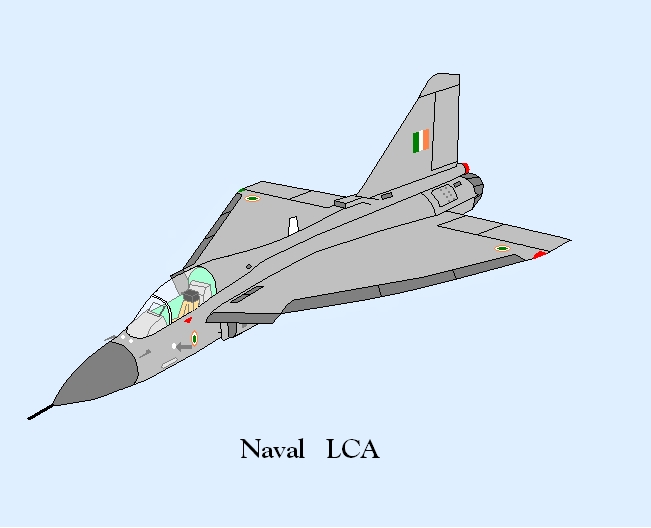
Naval LCA

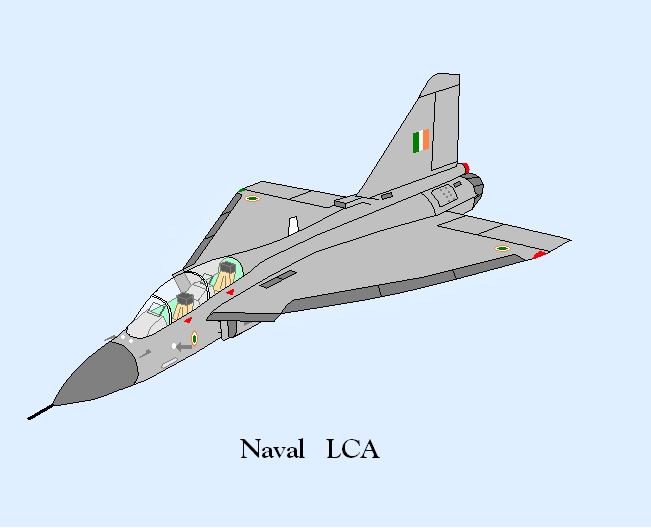
LCA Navy Trainer

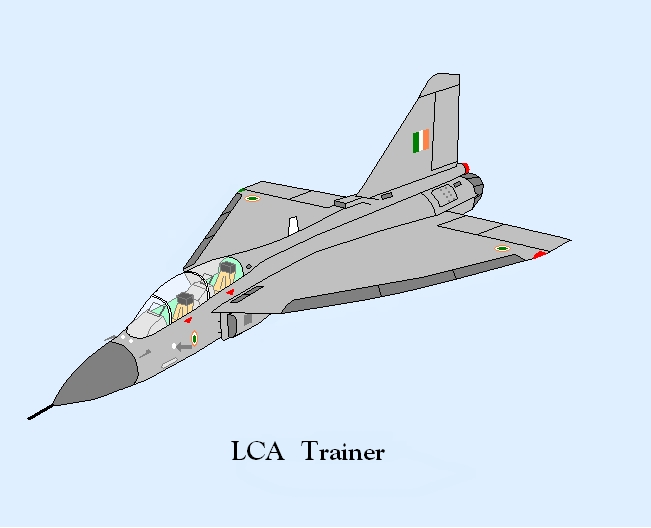
LCA Trainer

== Operators ==
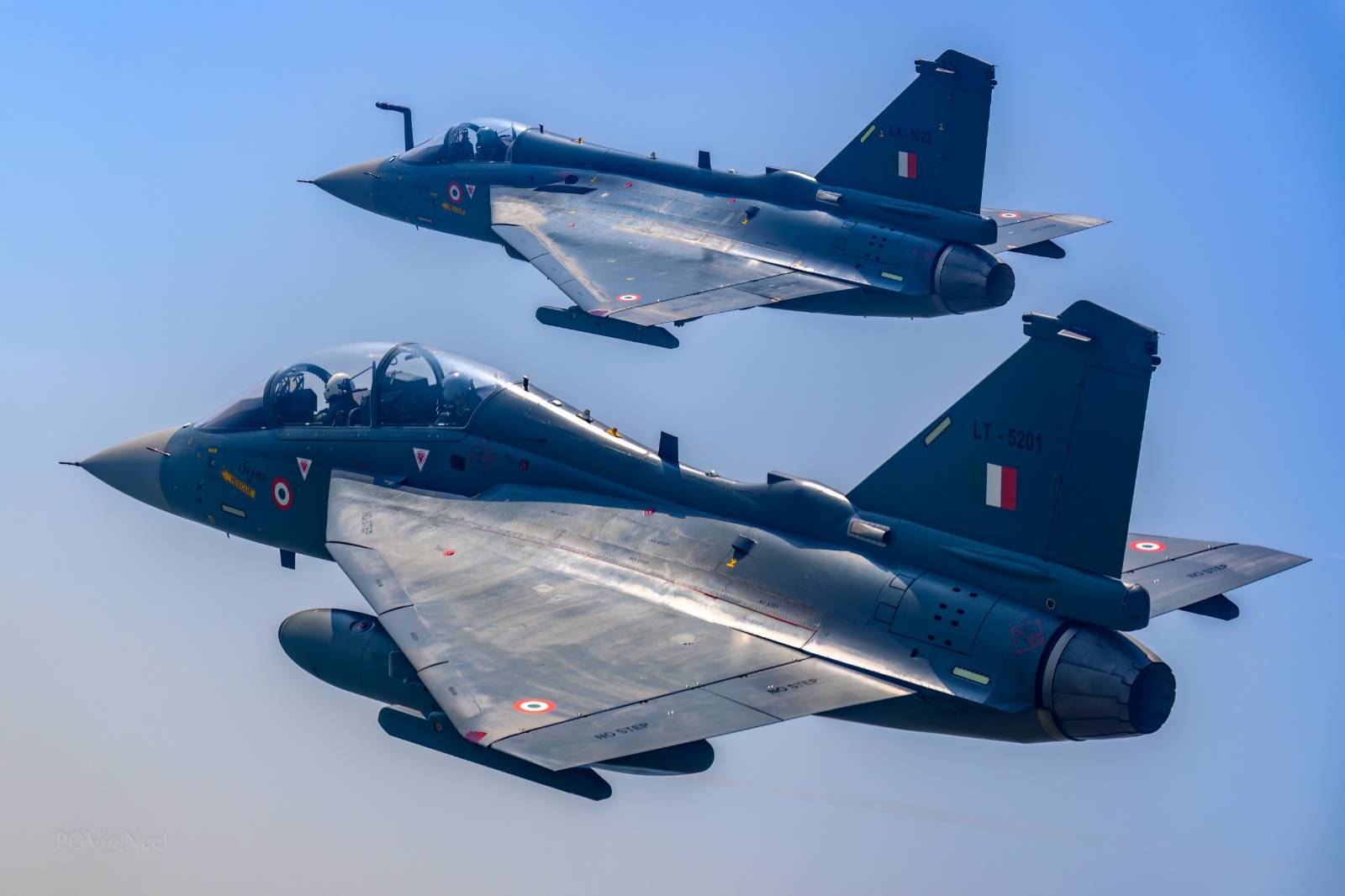
Tejas Mk 1 and trainer (forefront) of the Indian Air Force

India

- Indian Air Force
  - Orders and deliveries:
    - Mark 1 – 32 delivered (30 operational)
    - Mark 1 trainer – 8 delivered, 10 on order
    - Mark 1A – 141 on order
    - Mark 1A trainer – 29 on order
  - Deployment:
    - Sulur Air Force Station
      - No. 45 Squadron (Flying Daggers)
    - Naliya Air Force Station
      - No. 18 Squadron (Flying Bullets)

Operators	HAL Tejas Orders						HAL Tejas Deliveries						Losses	In service	Notes
Operators	Mark 1 IOC	Mark 1 FOC	Mark 1 trainer	Mark 1A fighter	Mark 1A trainer	Total	Mark 1 IOC	Mark 1 FOC	Mark 1 trainer	Mark 1A fighter	Mark 1A trainer	Total	Losses	In service	Notes
(India) Indian Air Force	16	16	18	141	29	220	16	16 (-2)	8 (+10)	0 (+141)	0 (+29)	40	-2	38	
TOTAL	16	16	18	141	29	220	16	16	8	0	0	40	-2	38	

To be delivered
Losses

== Accidents and incidents ==
Since its first flight in 2001, two Tejas aircraft have been lost in accidents, including one fatal case:

- 12 March 2024: A Tejas Mk 1 aircraft from the No. 18 Squadron of the Indian Air Force crashed near Jaisalmer in Rajasthan, India after taking part in a tri-service exercise, Bharat Shakti. The pilot ejected safely and no one was harmed. The crash was the first for the Tejas since the project's inception. In July 2024, officials involved in the investigation stated that an oil pump failure may have led to an engine seizure, that resulted in the crash.
- 21 November 2025: A Tejas Mk 1 aircraft from the No. 18 Squadron of the Indian Air Force, in service with the IAF since 2020, crashed during the Dubai Airshow held at the Al Maktoum International Airport in Dubai, United Arab Emirates while performing a barrel roll maneuver, and the pilot was killed in the incident. The Indian Air Force announced the constitution of a court of inquiry to investigate the cause of the accident.
- 7 February 2026: A Tejas Mk 1 of the Indian Air Force was involved in an incident at the Naliya Air Force Station while taking off for a training sortie. The pilot sustained minor injuries and there was no ejection. Preliminary reports indicate a technical glitch and onboard systems failure leading to a "suspected brake failure". The aircraft then overshot the runway and slid into a mud patch softened by prior rainfall. After this incident, the entire fleet of Tejas has been grounded for inspection. HAL later clarified the incident as a minor technical glitch which is being resolved with the IAF. It was reported following an investigation that the crash was caused by a software glitch of the aircraft's onboard systems. A software was upgraded jointly with the IAF and HAL and was being "tried out" as of 12 March. The entire fleet will eventually receive the software upgrade. The remaining 36 jets, including 6 trainers, underwent mechanical and metallurgical "exhaustive tests" which included checking the metallurgy of the under carriage that holds the wheels, the electro-magnetic system used for applying brakes and the software. As per reports on 2 April, the 36-aircraft fleet is expected to receive flying clearance by 8 April. HAL received the clearance from the local modification committee (LMC). Before the final clearance to return to active service, the aircraft will undergo one-time checks.

== Specifications (Tejas Mk-1A) ==
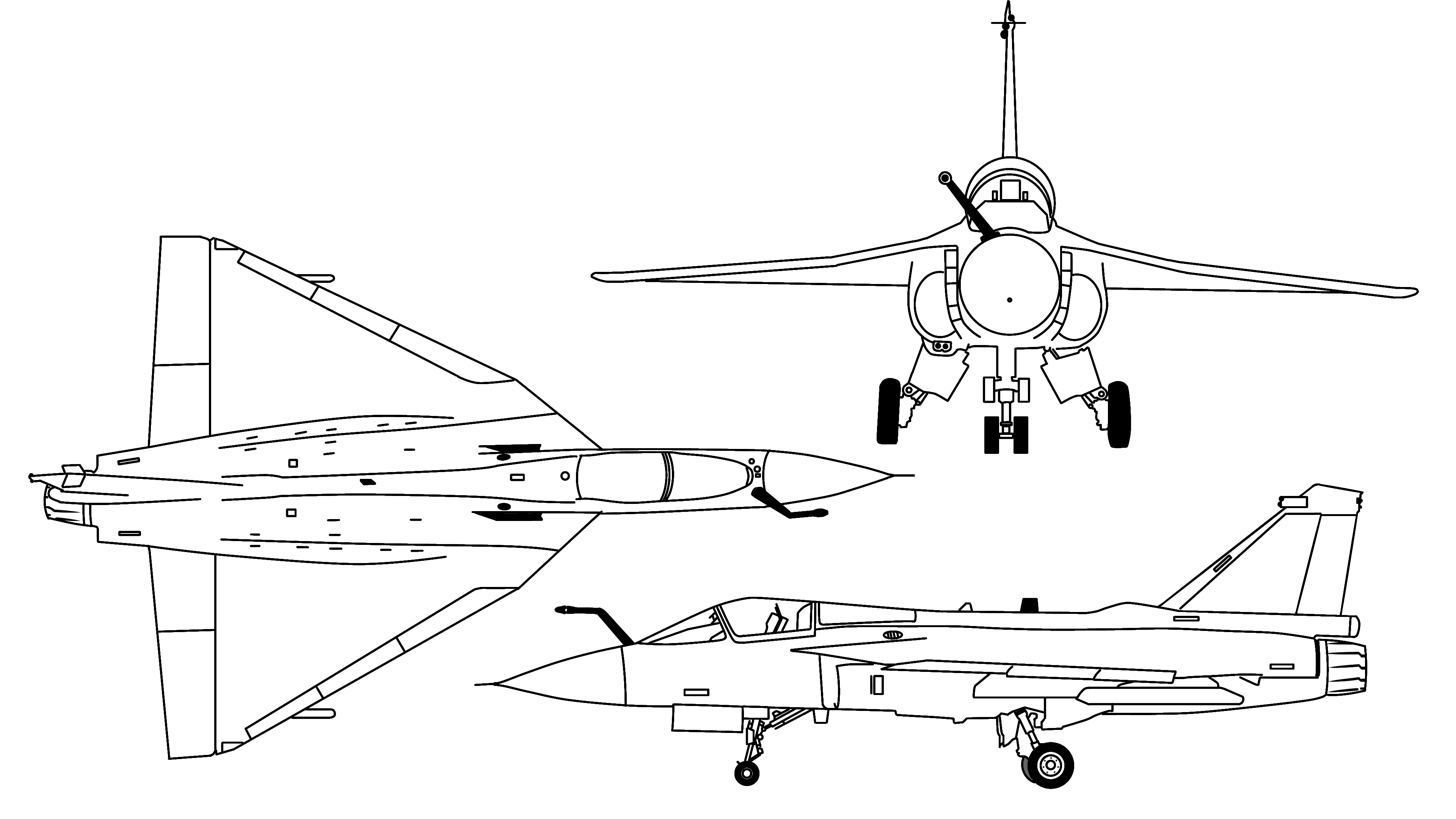
3-view line drawing of Tejas Mark 1A

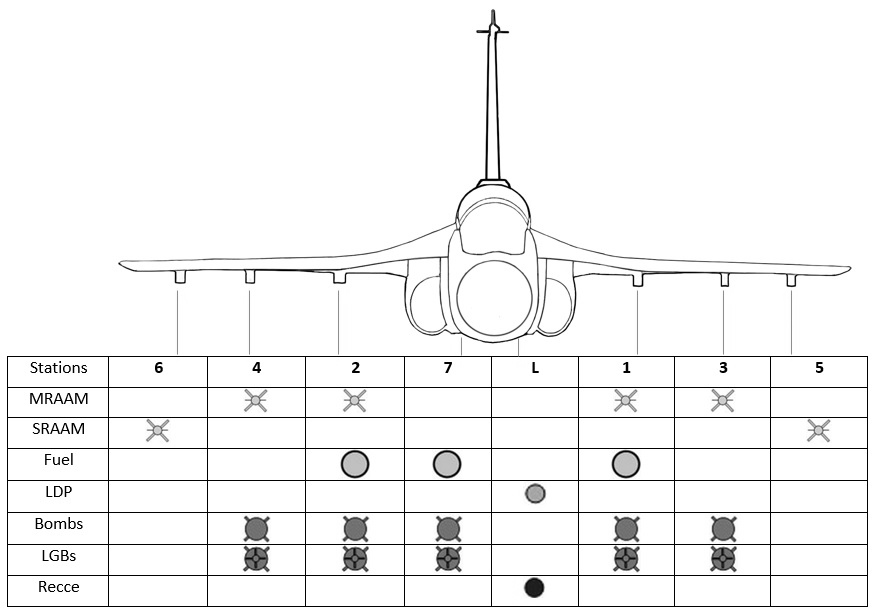
Weapon Stations on-board Tejas Mark 1

Data from Aeronautical Development Agency, DRDO, Jane's, and HAL.

General characteristics

- Crew: 1 or 2
- Length: 13.2 m (43 ft 4 in)
- Wingspan: 8.2 m (26 ft 11 in)
- Height: 4.4 m (14 ft 5 in)
- Wing area: 38.4 m^{2} (413 sq ft)
- Empty weight: 6,560 kg (14,462 lb)
- Gross weight: 9,800 kg (21,605 lb)
- Max takeoff weight: 13,500 kg (29,762 lb)
- Fuel capacity: 2,458 kg (5,419 lb)3,060 L (670 imp gal; 810 US gal) internal; 2 × 1,200 L (260 imp gal; 320 US gal), 800 L (180 imp gal; 210 US gal) drop tank inboard, 725 L (159 imp gal; 192 US gal) drop tank under fuselage
- Payload: 4,500 kg (9,900 lb) – 5,300 kg (11,700 lb) external stores
- Powerplant: 1 × General Electric F404-GE-IN20 afterburning turbofan with FADEC, 85 kN (19,000 lbf) with afterburner

Performance

- Maximum speed: 2,220 km/h (1,380 mph, 1,200 kn)
- Maximum speed: Mach 1.8
- Combat range: 739 km (459 mi, 399 nmi)
- Ferry range: 3,000 km (1,864.1 mi, 1,619.9 nmi)
- Service ceiling: 16,000 m (52,500 ft)
- g limits: +9/-3.5
- Wing loading: 255.2 kg/m^{2} (52.3 lb/sq ft)
- Thrust/weight: 1.07

Armament

- Guns: 1 × 23 mm twin-barrel GSh-23 cannon with 220 rounds
- Hardpoints: 9 with a capacity of 5300 kg, with provisions to carry combinations of:
  - Missiles:
    - Air-to-air missiles:
      - 2 × R-73
      - 4 × I-Derby ER
      - 2 × Python-5
      - 4 × Astra Mk 1
      - 4 × Astra Mk 2 (Planned)
      - 4 × ASRAAM
      - 4 × Meteor (Planned)
    - Air-to-surface missile:
      - AASM-Hammer (SBU-38/54/64)
      - 2 × BrahMos-NG ALCM (Planned)
      - SCALP-EG (Planned)
    - Anti-radiation missile:
      - 2 × Rudram-1 (Planned)
    - Anti-ship missile:
      - 2 × NASM-MR
  - Bombs:
    - Precision-guided munition:
      - Spice
      - Joint Direct Attack Munition
      - HSLD-100/250/450/500
      - Gaurav (glide bomb)
      - Smart Anti-Airfield Weapon
      - Tactical Advanced Range Augmentation
      - Al Tariq-LR (potential)
    - Laser-guided bomb:
      - GBU-16 Paveway II
      - Sudarshan
      - Griffin LGB
    - Cluster munition:
  - BDL Chaff/Flare Counter Measure Dispensing System (CMDS)
  - DARE Targeting pod (Tejas Mk.1 FOC)
  - Rafael Litening III

Avionics

- Radar
  - Elta EL/M-2032 multimode fire control radar (Tejas Mk 1, Tejas trainer)
  - Elta EL/M-2052 AESA fire control radar (Tejas Mk 1A)
  - LRDE Uttam AESA (From 97 Tejas Mk 1A)
- DARE-Elisra Mayawi self protection suite
- DARE Angad EW Suite (From 41st aircraft onwards of 83 Tejas Mk 1A placed in 2021)
- Swayam Raksha Kavach EW System (For 97 Tejas Mk 1A placed in 2025)
- Elta ELL-8222WB jamming pod (possibly Scorpius ELL-8222SB upgrade in Tejas Mk 1A)
- Advanced Self Protection Jammer (ASPJ Pod on Tejas Mk 1A)
- MIL-STD-1553B bus

== See also ==
- HAL AMCA – Indian fifth-generation stealth fighter
- HAL HLFT-42 – Indian trainer aircraft project
- HAL Tejas timeline – Development of the HAL Tejas and its variants

Related development

- HAL TEDBF – Indian carrier-based multirole combat aircraft
- HAL Tejas Mark 2 – Indian 4.5 gen multirole fighter

Related lists

- List of active Indian military aircraft
- List of fighter aircraft
