= Exercise Vayushakti =

Firepower Demonstration Exercise of Indian Air Force

Exercise Vayushakti (lit. 'Air Power') is a military exercise conducted by the Indian Air Force (IAF) to showcase how it can dominate the skies and support ground operations in a simulated wartime environment. Exercise Vayushakti involves fighter jets, helicopters and transport planes to demonstrate air defence capabilities of IAF typically held at Thar Desert.

The exercise traces its origins back to the early 1950s. The term is combination of two words, "Vayu" meaning Air (or Wind) and "Shakti" which means Power (or Strength).

== 2010 ==
The 2010 edition of the exercise was conducted on 28 February at the Chandan Fire Range, Pokhran. The exercise was conducted for two hours throughout the day, dusk, and night, showcasing the fire power and "blitzkrieg" capabilities of the Air Force in the presence of the then President of India, Pratibha Patil, and the then Defence Minister of India, A. K. Antony. A total of 106 IAF aircraft took part in the exercise including frontline combat aircraft like Su-30MKI, Mirage 2000, MiG-27 and MiG-29. Surya Kiran and Sarang display team displayed their aerobatics to their spectators. Other aircraft in the exercise included Mi-35 attack helicopter, Mi-17 medium-lift helicopter, Il-76 heavy lift and An-32 medium lift transport aircraft as well as an A-50EI AWACS. This edition was the debut for an AWACS. While around 70 of the aircraft took active part in the exercise, the rest of the aircraft were kept on reserve. As for the Fire Power Demonstration (FPD), the targets included mock radar sites, tanks, marshalling yards, terrorist camps, runways, BMP infantry fighting vehicles, blast pens and convoys among others. The Garud Commando Force of the Air Force were also paradropped as part of a drill to neutralise a terrorist camp. Other Indian Special Forces including Army's Para SF and MARCOS were also part of the exercise.

== 2024 ==
The 2024 edition began on 17 February at the Pokhran Field Firing Range with the theme "Navsah Vajra Praharam" (Lightning Strike from the Sky). The Chief of Defence Staff, General Anil Chauhan, presided as the chief guest witnessing a large-scale firepower demonstration involving more than 120 aircraft that demonstrated the IAF's day-night offensive capabilities. The combat fleet featured 77 jets including the Su-30 MKI, MiG-29, Mirage-2000, Tejas (LCA), and Hawk advanced jet trainers along with 41 helicopters and five transport aircraft.

The event saw the debut of the IAF's Rafale fighter jet, Prachanda LCH and the Apache attack helicopter. Indian Army Rudra helicopters also participated. A significant milestone of the 2024 exercise was the inaugural participation of IAF CH-47 Chinook which demonstrated rapid tactical deployment by airlifting the Indian Army's M-777 Ultra-Light Howitzers.

== 2026 ==
Centered on the theme "Achook, Abhedya aur Sateek" (Accurate, Invincible, and Precise), the exercise was held on 27 February at the IAF's Pokhran Field Firing Range near Jaisalmer in Rajasthan Fighter jets such as Hawk, Jaguar, MiG-29, Mirage-2000, Rafale and Su-30 MKI participated however indigenously developed Tejas missed the drill due to grounding after a recent technical incident. Transport and airlift planes like C-17, C-130J and C-295 along with Helicopters such as ALH Dhruv, LCH Prachand and Mi-17 also participated to highlight air defence operations including offensive air strikes and special forces missions along with humanitarian and disaster response capabilities of IAF. The edition included the participation of 77 fighter aircraft, 43 helicopters and eight transport aircraft as well as 12,000 kg of explosives were deployed.

Over 130 aircraft were mobilized for the drill which also featured advanced weapon systems Akash, Counter Unmanned Aerial Systems (CUAS), Short Range Loitering Munitions (SRLM), and SpyDer performing missions across day, dusk, and night. Indian Army's Bofors L70 also took part.

With guests from over 40 nations in attendance, the event marked two historic milestones: the debut of women pilots in the exercise and chief guest President Droupadi Murmu flying a sortie in the indigenously developed HAL Prachand. Para SF and Garud Commando Force were also part of the exercise.

== See also ==
- List of exercises of the Indian Air Force
- List of active Indian military aircraft
- Iron Fist (exercise)
- Exercise Garuda
- Exercise Tarang Shakti
- Cope India
- Exercise Aakraman
