= List of exercises of the Indian Air Force =

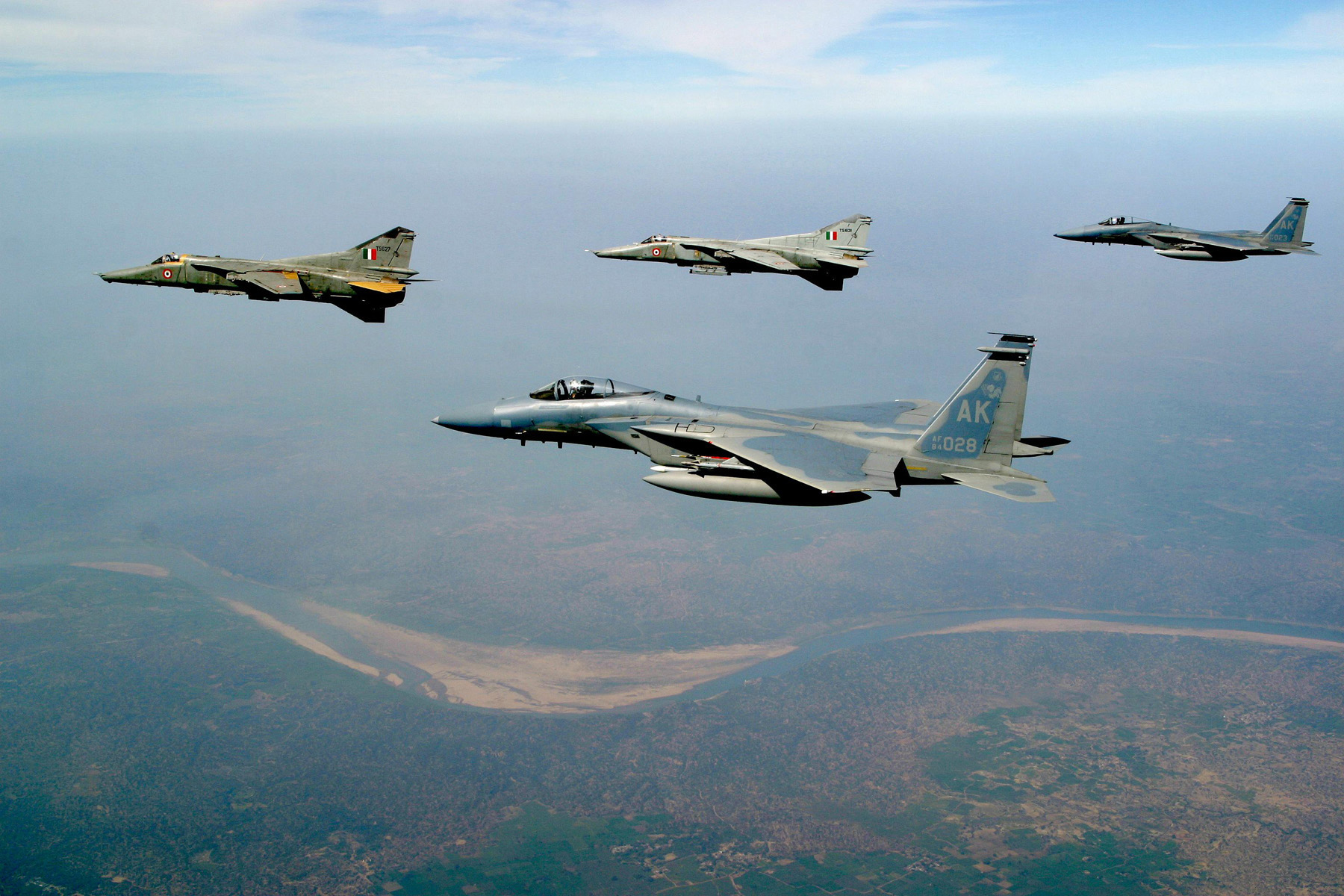
Indian Air Force's MiG 27 in a formation with US Air Force's F-15 in exercise Cope India 2004

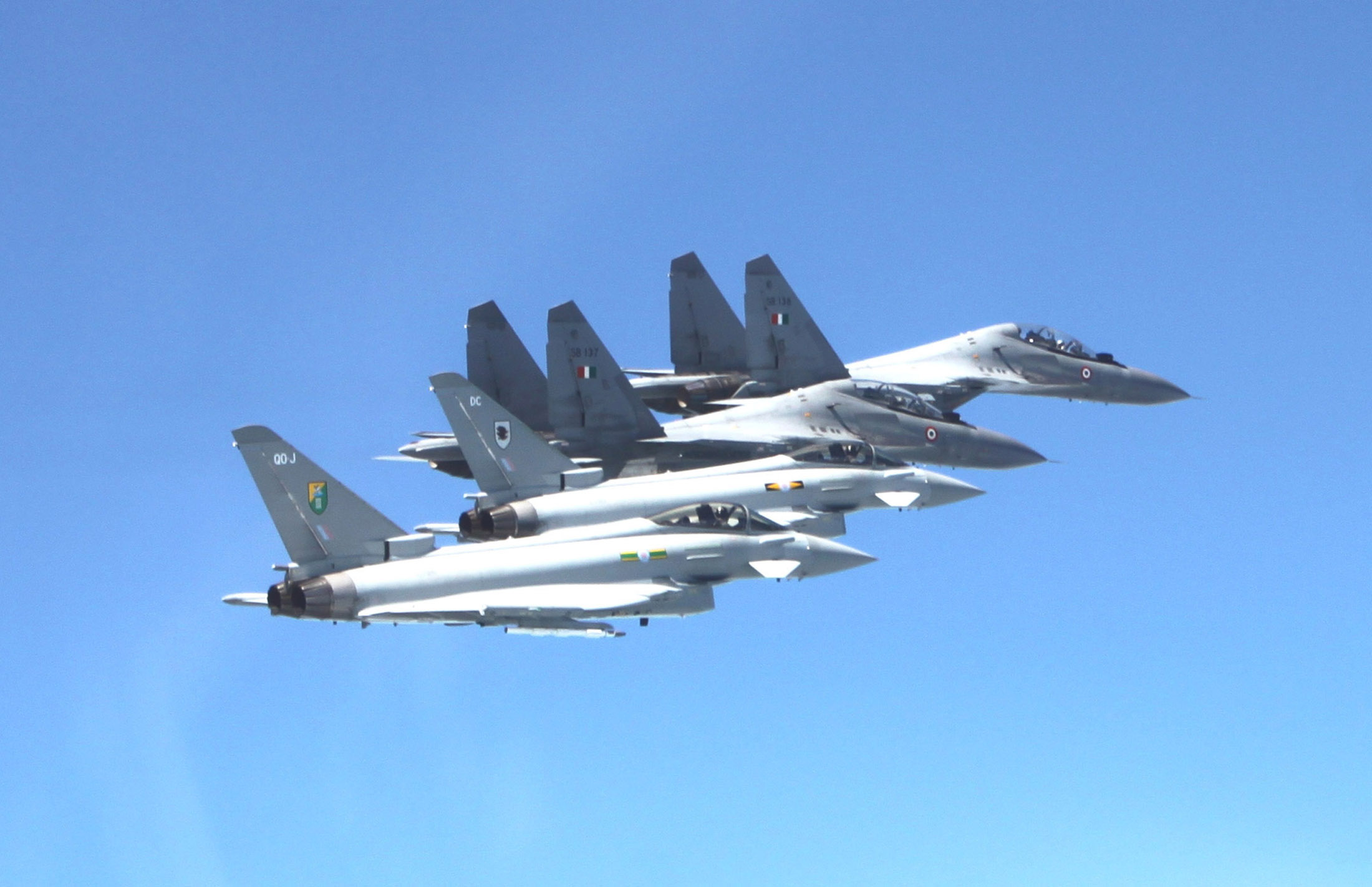
IAF Su-30MKIs and RAF Eurofighter Typhoons during Indradhanush 2010 exercise

The Indian Air Force engages in multiple military exercises with foreign nations and their air forces to increase interoperability between themselves. Some are also multinational exercise. The following is a list of exercises of the Indian Air Force.:

1. Exercise Garuda (India, France)
2. Cope India (India, United States)
3. SINDEX (India, Singapore)
4. Gaganshakti (only India)
5. Indradhanush (India, UK)
6. Exercise Red Flag (Multinational, Host: USA)
7. Exercise Desert Eagle (India, UAE)
8. Exercise Eastern Bridge (India, Oman)
9. Exercise Iron Fist (only India)
10. Red Flag – Alaska (Multinational, Host: United States)
11. Siam Bharat (India, Thailand)
12. Pralay Shayam (Disaster response exercise)
13. Exercise INDRA –bilateral (India, Russia)
14. Exercise Blue Flag (Multinational, Host: Israel)
15. Exercise DANX (only India)
16. Exercise Pitch Black (Multinational, Host: Australia)
17. Aviaindra (India, Russia)
18. Shinyuu Maitri (India, Japan)
19. Vayushakti (only India)
20. Exercise Desert Knight (India, France, UAE)
21. Exercise Desert Warrior (India, Egypt)
22. Exercise Cobra Warrior (Multinational, Host: United Kingdom)
23. Exercise Udara Shakti (India, Malaysia)
24. Bharat Shakti (Tri-service)
25. Exercise Tarang Shakti (Multinational, Host: India)
26. Exercise INIOCHOS (Multinational, Host: Greece)
27. Exercise Desert Flag (Multinational, Host: UAE)
28. Exercise Aakraman (only India)
29. Exercise Tiger Claw (India, United States) (Special Forces)
30. Exercise Ocean Sky (Multinational, Host: Spain)
31. Exercise Veer Guardian (India, Japan)

The Indian Air Force's participation in multinational air exercises has evolved significantly over the decades. From early bilateral training drills to hosting full-scale multilateral exercises such as Tarang Shakti, this evolution has reflected India’s growing airpower confidence, interoperability goals, and strategic partnerships. A detailed historical narrative on this transformation has been documented.

== 1963 ==
Name	Participating Country	Units	Date	Location	References
1963
Exercise Shiksha	Australia, India (Host), United Kingdom, United States			Palam AFS, India	

== 2000 – 2010 ==
Name	Participating Country	Units	Date	Location	References
2003
Garuda I	France			Maharajpur AFS, India	
2004
Cope India	United States	Sukhoi Su-30 MKI; Dassault Mirage 2000; Mikoyan MiG-27; Mikoyan-Gurevich MiG-21	16 - 27 February	Gwalior AFS, India	
Sindex I	Singapore			Gwalior AFS, India	
2005
Garuda II	France			Istres Air Base, France	
2006
Sindex II	Singapore	Mikoyan MiG-27	3 - 20 January	Kalaikunda AFS, India	
Gagan Shakti	-		4 - 27 September	Western Air Command; South Western Air Command	
Indradhanush I	United Kingdom		2 - 13 October	Gwalior AFS, India	
Sindex III	Singapore	Mikoyan MiG-27	8 November	Kalaikunda AFS, India	
Sindex IV	Singapore		8 - 22 December	Paya Lebar Air Base, Singapore	
2007
Garuda III	France	Sukhoi Su-30 MKI; Dassault Mirage 2000; Mikoyan MiG-27	13 - 25 February	Kalaikunda AFS, India	
Indradhanush II	United Kingdom	Sukhoi Su-30 MKI; 1 Ilyushin IL-78 MKI		RAF Waddington, United Kingdom	
Sindex V	Singapore	Mikoyan MiG-27, No. 18 Squadron	26 November - 13 December	Kalaikunda AFS, India	
2008
Red Flag	United States (Host), India, France, South Korea	8 Sukhoi Su-30 MKI; 2 Ilyushin IL-78 MKI; 2 Ilyushin Il-76; 247 Garud Commandos	9 - 23 August	Nellis AFB, United States	
Exercise Desert Eagle I	UAE		September	Al-Dhafra airbase, UAE	
2009
Cope India	United States	Ilyushin Il-76; Antonov An-32; Mil Mi-17; Garud Commandos	19 - 23 October	Agra AFS, India	
Eastern Bridge I	Oman	6 SEPECAT Jaguar; 1 Ilyushin IL-78 MKI; 1 Ilyushin Il-76	31 October	Jamnagar AFS, India	
2010
Vayushakti 10	—	Fighter aircraft: Su-30MKI; Mirage 2000; MiG-27; MiG-29; Helicopters: Mi-35 (attack helicopter; 104 Squadron); Mi-17 (medium-lift helicopter); Transport aircraft: Il-76 (heavy-lift; 44 Squadron); An-32 (medium-lift); AWACS: A-50EI (50 Squadron); Indian Special Forces: Garud Commando Force; Para SF; MARCOS; Aerobatics team: Surya Kiran; Sarang	28 February	Chandan Fire Range, Pokhran, India	
Garuda IV	India, France (Host), Singapore	6 Sukhoi Su-30 MKI; 3 Ilyushin IL-78 MKI; 1 Ilyushin Il-76	14 - 25 June	Istres Air Base, France	
Indradhanush III	United Kingdom	Sukhoi Su-30 MKI; Dassault Mirage 2000; Mikoyan MiG-27; Ilyushin IL-78 MKI; Beriev A-50	18 October - 3 November	Kalaikunda AFS, West Bengal	

== 2011 – 2020 ==
Name	Participating Country	Units	Date	Location	References
2011
Eastern Bridge II	Oman	SEPECAT Jaguar (6 Squadron); Mikoyan MiG-29 (28 Squadron)	22 October	Jamnagar AFS, India	
2013
Iron Fist	-	Sukhoi Su-30 MKI; SEPECAT Jaguar; Mikoyan MiG-29; HAL Tejas; Mikoyan MiG-27; Dassault Mirage 2000; Mikoyan-Gurevich MiG-21; Lockheed Martin C-130J Super Hercules; Antonov An-32; Ilyushin Il-76; Beriev A-50; Mil Mi-8; Mil Mi-17; Mil Mi-35	February 2013	Pokhran, India	
2014
Garuda V	France	4 Sukhoi Su-30 MKI; 4 Mikoyan MiG-27; 4 Mikoyan-Gurevich MiG-21; 1 Ilyushin IL-78 MKI; 1 Beriev A-50	2 - 13 June	Jodhpur AFS, India	
2015
Indradhanush IV	United Kingdom	4 Sukhoi Su-30 MKI, No. 2 Squadron; 1 Ilyushin IL-78 MKI; 1 Boeing C-17 Globemaster III	30 July	RAF Coningsby and RAF Brize Norton, United Kingdom	
2016
Iron Fist	-	Sukhoi Su-30 MKI; HAL Tejas; Suryakiran Aerobatic Team; Garud Commando Force	18 March	Pokhran, India	
Red Flag – Alaska 16-1	United States	4 Sukhoi Su-30 MKI; 4 SEPECAT Jaguar; 2 Ilyushin IL-78 MKI; 1 Boeing C-17 Globemaster III	28 April - May 13	Eielson AFB, United States	
Desert Eagle II	UAE	4 Sukhoi Su-30 MKI	May 24 - June 3	Al-Dhafra airbase, UAE	
Siam Bharat I	Thailand				
2017
Eastern Bridge IV	Oman	Sukhoi Su-30 MKI; Mikoyan Mig-29; SEPECAT Jaguar; Mikoyan MiG-27	16 - 20 January	Jamnagar AFS, India	
Siam Bharat II	Thailand		22 - 26 May	Chiang Mai, Thailand	
	Sri Lanka	Air warrior drill team	9 - 14 July	Colombo, Sri Lanka	
Pralay Shayam (Disaster response exercise)	-	Mil Mi-17; HAL Dhruv; HAL Chetak	23 September	Hyderabad, India	
Indra (tri-service)	Russia	2 Ilyushin Il-76	19 - 29 October	Sergeyvsky Training Ranges, Russia	
Blue Flag	Israel (Host), India and 6 other nations	1 Lockheed Martin C-130J Super Hercules; 45 Garud Commandos	2 - 6 November	Uvda Air Force Base, Israel	
DANX (Defence of Andaman & Nicobar Exercise)	—	SEPECAT Jaguar; Lockheed Martin C-130J Super Hercules	20 - 24 November	Andaman & Nicobar Islands, India	
2018
Gaganshakti	—	Sukhoi Su-30 MKI; Mikoyan Mig-29; SEPECAT Jaguar; HAL Tejas; Mikoyan-Gurevich MiG-21; Mikoyan MiG-27; Lockheed Martin C-130J Super Hercules; Ilyushin IL-78 MKI	8 - 22 April	India	
Pitch Black	Australia (Host), India and 10 other nations	4 Sukhoi Su-30 MKI; 1 Ilyushin IL-78 MKI; 1 Boeing C-17 Globemaster III; 1 Lockheed Martin C-130J Super Hercules; 145 Garud Commandos	27 July - 18 August	Darwin Air Force Base, Australia	
Bi-lateral exercise	Indonesia	4 Sukhoi Su-30 MKI; 1 Ilyushin IL-78 MKI; 1 Boeing C-17 Globemaster III; 1 Lockheed Martin C-130J Super Hercules; 145 Garud Commandos	20 - 22 August	Subang Air Base, Malaysia	
Aviaindra	Russia	Sukhoi Su-30 MKI; Mikoyan Mig-29; Mil Mi-8	17 - 28 September	Lipetsk, Russia	
Aviaindra	Russia		10 - 22 December	Jodhpur, India	
Cope India	United States		3 - 14 December	Kalaikunda and Panagarh Air Force Stations, India	
Shinyuu Maitri - Bi-Lateral Exercise	Japan	C-17 Globemaster; Antonov An-32	03-7 December	AFS Agra	
2019
Vayushakti 19	—		16 February	Pokhran, India	
Garud VI	France	Sukhoi Su-30 MKI; Dassault Rafale; Ilyushin IL-78; C-17 Globemaster	1 - 12 July	Mont-de-Marsan, France	

== 2020 – present ==
Name	Participating Country	Units	Date	Location	References
2021
Exercise Desert Knight 21	India & France	India- Su-30 MKI, Mirage 2000, Beriev A-50, C-130-J and Il-78MKI; France- Rafale, A330 MRTT, A400M	23 January	Jodhpur AFS, India	
Desert Warrior- Joint Tactical Air Exercise	Egypt		30-31 October	El Berigat Air Base, Egypt	
2022
Pitch Black	Australia (Host), India and 15 other nations	4 Sukhoi Su-30 MKI; 1 Ilyushin IL-78 MKI; 1 Boeing C-17 Globemaster III	27 July - 18 August	Darwin Air Force Base, Australia	
Garuda VII	France	Sukhoi Su-30 MKI; Dassault Rafale; HAL Tejas; SEPECAT Jaguar; HAL Prachand; Mil Mi-17; 1 Ilyushin IL-78 MKI; other unspecified AEW&C	26 October to 12 November	Jodhpur AFS, India	
2023
Exercise Cobra Warrior 23-1	United Kingdom (Host), Belgium, Finland, India, Saudi Arabia, United States	145 personnel: 5 Dassault Mirage 2000; 1 Ilyushin IL-78 MKI; 2 Boeing C-17 Globemaster III	6 March to 24 March	RAF Waddington; RAF Coningsby	
2024
Exercise Desert Knight 24	India (Host), France, United Arab Emirates	India- Su-30 MKI, MiG-29, Jaguar, Beriev A-50, C-130-J and Il-78MKI; France- Rafale, A330 MRTT; UAE- F-16	23 January	Arabian Sea, Indian FIS	
Vayushakti 24	—	>121 aircraft: Fighter jets – Tejas, Rafale, Mirage 2000, MiG-29, Su-30 MKI, Jaguar, Hawk; Transport aircraft – C-130J; Helicopter – Prachand, Dhruv, Chinook, Apache, Mi-17; Surface to Air Missiles – Akash, SAMAR	17 February	Pokhran, India	
Bharat Shakti (Tri-service)	—	HAL Tejas; HAL Dhruv; HAL Rudra; HAL Prachand	12 March	Pokhran, India	
Gaganshakti	—	All units of IAF	1 - 10 April	India	
Red Flag – Alaska 24-2	Germany, India, Netherlands, Singapore, United Kingdom; United States (Host)	8 Dassault Rafale; 1 Ilyushin IL-78 MKI; 1 Boeing C-17 Globemaster III	4 - 14 June	Eielson Air Force Base, United States	
Pitch Black	Australia (Host), India and 18 other nations	4 Sukhoi Su-30 MKI; 1 Ilyushin IL-78 MKI; 1 Boeing C-17 Globemaster III	27 July - 18 August	Darwin Air Force Base, Australia	
Exercise Udara Shakti	Malaysia	4 Sukhoi Su-30 MKI; 1 Ilyushin IL-78 MKI; 1 Boeing C-17 Globemaster III	5 - 9 August	Kuantan, Malaysia	
Tarang Shakti	Phase I: India (Host), France, Germany, Spain, United Kingdom.; Phase II: India (Host), Australia, Bangladesh, Greece, Singapore, United Arab Emirates, United States		Phase I– 6 - 14 August Phase II– 29 August to 14 September	Sulur AFS; Jodhpur AFS	
Exercise Eastern Bridge VII	Oman	India: MiG-29, Jaguar, C-17 Oman: F-16, Hawk	11 - 22 September	RAFO Masirah, Oman	
Joint Military Training	Singapore	India: Su-30MKI, Mirage 2000, MiG-29, Jaguar, Tejas Singapore: F-16, F-15, G-550 AEW&C, C-130	21 October - 9 December	Kalaikunda AFS, India	
2025
Exercise INIOCHOS-25	Greece (Host), India and 13 other nations	Su-30MKI; Il-78MKI; C-17	31 March - 11 April	Andravida Air Base, Greece	
Exercise Desert Flag-10	UAE (Host), India and 10 other nations	MiG-29; Jaguar	21 April - 8 May	Al Dhafra Air Base, UAE	
Exercise Aakraman	India		Late April		
Exercise Tiger Claw	United States	(Special Forces exercise)	26 May - 10 June	Garud Regimental Training Centre (GRTC), Chandigarh Air Force Station	
Exercise Ocean Sky 2025	Spain (Host), India and other nations		20 - 31 October	Gando Air Base, Spain	
Garuda VIII	France	6 Su-30MKI; 3 C-17; 1 Il-78MKI	16 – 27 November	Mont-de-Marsan Air Base, France	
AviaIndra	Russia	Su-30MKI; Tejas; Il-78MKI; Mi-17	15 – 22 December	India	
2026
Indo Thai In-situ Exercise	India and Thailand	Su-30MKI; Il-78MKI	9 - 12 February	Indian Ocean Region	Exercise included IAF AWACS and Thai Gripen and Ground Control Interception (GCI).
Vayushakti 26	—	77 fighter aircraft, 43 helicopters and eight transport aircraft, with 277 weapons and 12,000 kg of explosives.: Fighter jets – Tejas, Rafale, Mirage 2000, MiG-29, Su-30 MKI, Jaguar, Hawk; Transport aircraft – C-130J, C-295, C-17; Helicopter – Prachand, Rudra, Chinook, Apache, Mi-17; Surface to Air Missiles – Akash, SPYDER; Short Range Loitering Munitions (SRLM), Counter Unmanned Aerial Systems (CUAS)	27 February	Pokhran Air-to-Ground Range, Jaisalmer, India	Motto: "Achook, Abhedya aur Sateek". The exercise will be undertaken during day, dusk and night.
Pitch Black	Australia (Host), India and 18 other nations	>120 personnel: 4 Dassault Rafale; 1 Ilyushin IL-78 MKI; 2 Boeing C-17 Globemaster III	20 July – 7 August	Darwin Air Force Base, Australia	
Exercise Udara Shakti	Malaysia	>120 personnel: 4 Dassault Rafale; 1 Ilyushin IL-78 MKI; 2 Boeing C-17 Globemaster III		Subang, Malaysia	The RMAF had deployed Su-30MKM and F/A-18 Hornet aircraft.
Veer Guardian	Japan	Tejas; Su-30MKI; Rafale	9 – 22 September	Jodhpur Air Force Station, India	JASDF deployed the F-2A fighters.
Tarang Shakti	India (Host), Australia, Bangladesh, France, Germany, Greece, Sri Lanka, United Arab Emirates		26 September – 12 October	Jodhpur Air Force Station, India	

== See also ==
- List of exercises of the Indian Army
- List of Indian Naval deployments
- Exercise TROPEX
