= Iron Fist (exercise) =

Indian Air Force exercise

Iron Fist is an Indian Air Force exercise held at Pokhran, Rajasthan. It has been held twice: 2013 and 2016.

== Iron Fist 2013 ==
The Iron Fist 2013 was the Indian Air Force's first day-night exercise. It was conducted on 22 February 2013 at the Pokhran firing range. The main objective was to display network-centric operations capabilities of the Indian Air Force. More than 100 aircraft (equal number of aircraft were at standby) and 30 different weapon platforms participated. Along with aircraft, National Security Guard and Garud commandos displayed their tactical skills. The final day of the exercises saw several dignitaries arrive to see a demonstration of capabilities including President of India, Prime Minister, Defence Minister, Chief Minister of Rajasthan, Chief of Indian Navy and several more. A four-hour live telecast of the event was broadcast by Doordarshan National.

=== Live telecast ===
The live telecast was an attempt by the IAF to showcase its capabilities. It was accompanied by music and live commentary describing the aircraft, capabilities, mission under progress, target, weapon details, pilot and crew names and also live footage from the cockpit.

The live telecast was divided into four phases.

- Phase 1: Flypast

The flypast was done with several aircraft to start the events of live exercise. It consisted of the following displays:

1. 3 Mi-8 helicopters with the tricolor
2. MiG-27 flying at 450 km/hour with Iron Fist 13 banner in tow
3. Jaguar showing live footage of the main spectator stand from aircraft cameras
4. Rejuvenated Tiger Moth
5. Pilatus PC-7 Mk2 aerobics
6. MiG-29 (Supersonic flypast)
7. All 5 variants of MiG-21 in service with IAF in an Arrowhead formation
8. 5 Jaguar aircraft in Arrowhead formation
9. 5 Upgraded MiG-27 in Arrowhead formation
10. 5 MiG-29 in Arrowhead formation
11. Formation flight of Jaguar, MiG-21 Bison and MiG-27
12. 3 Su-30 MKI in Vic formation
13. HAL Cheetah + HAL Chetak + HAL Dhruv + HAL LCH
14. Aerobatics by HAL LCH
- Phase-2: Offensive capabilities

The Exercise showcased offensive operations like destroying communication centers, runways, hangars, fuel & ammunition buildings, etc. deep behind enemy lines. Major Offensive demonstrations:

1. Dive attack by Mirage 2000 after scouting of ground targets by Jaguar and IAI Herons
2. Mig-21 Bison attacking ground target with 64 mm Rockets
3. Su-30MKI dropping 1000 lb Guided bomb (Aborted)
4. Mig-27 firing 40 mm Rockets on ground targets
5. Su-30MKI firing runway penetrating bombs
6. Jaguar demonstrating precision bombing
7. Su-30MKI firing precision guided bombs
8. Jaguar firing 3 x 1000 lb bombs
9. HAL Tejas demonstrating swing role capability: an LGB on ground target quickly followed by an R-73 launch to shoot down a simulated interceptor
- Phase-3: Defensive Operations
1. MANPADS firing
2. Garud Commandos carrying out a Search & Rescue mission from a Mi-17 escorted by Mi-35.
3. OSA AK-M Surface to air firing
4. Mi-35 firing 80 mm Rockets on ground targets
5. BAe Hawk trainer aircraft two 125 kg bombs followed by 68 mm rockets
6. MiG-21 fire S-24 (240 mm caliber) heavy rockets
7. Su-30MKI fire 26 x 250 kg bombs demonstrating carpet bombing
8. 2 C-130J deploy 60 paratroopers
9. Mi-17 demonstrating quick slithering operation
10. Mi-17 demonstrating deploying of a Fast Attack Vehicle with 5 Guards who conduct a surgical strike and return to the Mi-17 for quick escape
11. IL-76 dropping heavy cargo with parachutes escorted by 2 Mig-29 who intercept and fire R-73 missile at an interceptor
12. C-130J demonstrates an assault landing on a short field deploys 26 commandos and quickly takes off in about 1000 feet and flies away with complex maneuvering
13. Mi-17 demonstrate fire control using slithered buckets
- Flying displays:

After these live weapons demonstrations, several aerobatics display and other events continued before commencing of Phase 4: Night Operations.

1. HAL Dhruv Sarang helicopter display team aerobatics
2. Su-30MKI aerobatics
3. Akash Ganga sky diving team deployed from an An-32
4. Simulation of the Operation Black Tornado by the NSG from a Mi-17
5. IAI Heron (remote-piloted aircraft, RPA) demonstration
6. Rifle drill by the Air Force
7. Musical performance by IAF bands
8. Handing mementos to various dignitaries in presence
- Phase-4: Night operations

Targets were briefed before the firing commenced. All aircraft fired flares before deploying targets to enhance visibility. Following operations were carried out:

1. An-32 modified to deploy weapons 10 x 1000 lb carpet bombing demonstration
2. MiG-27UP firing S-24 heavy rockets
3. Mirage-2000 firing dumb bombs
4. MiG-27UP firing S-24 heavy rockets
5. Jaguar firing 3 × 1000 lb bombs from 500 feet altitude
6. Jaguar firing 4 × 1000 lb bombs in dive
7. Su-30MKI firing 18 × 250 kg bombs (Aborted)
8. Jaguar 4 × 1000 lb bombs
9. Mi-17 Night Slither operation to drop Garud commandos under search light
10. Pechora SAM-3 ripple firing to an airborne target at 10 km range
11. Mi-35 firing S-24 heavy rockets fired with assistance of newly included NVG & FLIR avionics
12. IL-78MKI firing 300 flares to announce end of Iron Fist 2013
13. An-32 firing 50 flares

=== List of Aircraft participating ===
Fighter Aircraft

1. Sukhoi Su-30MKI
2. Mikoyan MiG-29 "Baaz"
3. Dassault Mirage 2000 "Vajra"
4. Mikoyan-Gurevich MiG-21
5. Mikoyan-Gurevich MiG-27 "Bahadur"
6. SEPECAT Jaguar "Shamsher"
7. HAL LCA "Tejas"

Transport Aircraft

1. Ilyushin Il-76 Candid "Gajraaj"
2. C-130J Super Hercules
3. Antonov An-32 Cline
4. DRDO EMB-145 AEWCS

Trainer Aircraft

1. BAE Hawk
2. Pilatus PC-7

Rotary Wing Aircraft

1. HAL Rudra
2. HAL Light Combat Helicopter
3. Mil Mi-35 Hind-E
4. Mil Mi-8
5. Mi-17
6. HAL Dhruv
7. HAL Cheetah
8. HAL Chetak

UAV

1. IAI Heron

Aircraft	Photo
Sukhoi Su-30MKI	
Mikoyan MiG-29	
Dassault Mirage 2000	
Mikoyan-Gurevich MiG-21	
Mikoyan-Gurevich MiG-27 Bahadur	
SEPECAT Jaguar	
HAL Tejas	
Ilyushin Il-76 Candid	
C-130J Super Hercules	
Antonov An-32 Cline	
EMB-145 AEWCS	
BAE Hawk	
Pilatus PC-7	
HAL Rudra	
HAL Light Combat Helicopter	
Mil Mi-35 Hind-E	
Mil Mi-8 Mi-17	
HAL Dhruv	
HAL Cheetah	
HAL Chetak	
IAI Heron	

=== Weapon systems ===
- IGLA
- Osa-AKM
- Pechora

=== Special Forces ===
NSG Commandos Garud Commandos Akash Ganga Sky Diving team

== Iron Fist 2016 ==
Iron Fist 2016 was held on 18 March 2016. It featured the participation of 181 aircraft, 103 of them fighter planes. It also included a display of the firepower of Tejas LCA for the first time.

Highlights

- 22 types of platforms, weapons systems.
- The firing of Akash missile.
- HAL LCH firing 70 mm rockets.
- Astra missile live firing

== See also ==
- List of exercises of the Indian Air Force
- List of active Indian military aircraft
- Exercise Vayushakti
