= Exercise Tarang Shakti =

Indian Air Force multinational training exercise

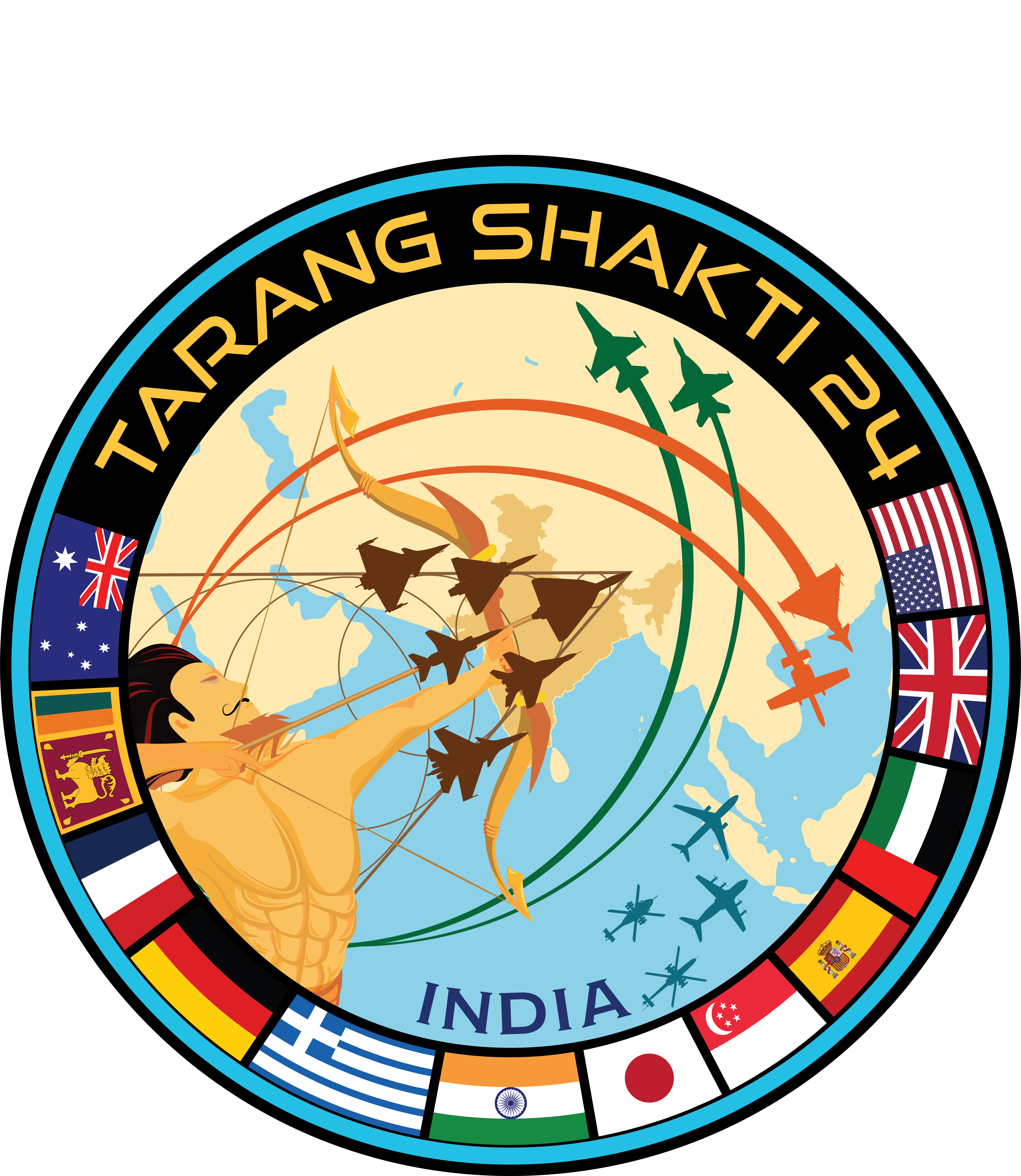
- Exercise Tarang Shakti 2024 official logo
- Status: Active
- Genre: Military exercise
- Frequency: Biennially
- Locations: Jodhpur Air Force Station (2024–26); Sulur Air Force Station (2024)
- Country: India
- Years active: 2
- Established: 2024
- Previous event: 2024 (6 August – 14 September)
- Next event: 2026 (26 September – 12 October)
- Participants: Indian Air Force & friendly air forces

Exercise Tarang Shakti is a biennial multinational air combat exercise hosted by the Indian Air Force. The 2024 maiden edition was the first and largest international air exercise hosted by India.

== Prelude ==
The first edition of Tarang Shakti was originally planned to be hosted in October and November 2023 with six participating air forces and six observing nations. The exercise was in planning stage in June 2023 with the objective being improving interoperability, sharing best practices among friendly nations and boosting military cooperation among the participating countries. While preparations for the exercise was completed in the Rajasthan sector by then, government approvals for the same was also expected soon. From 2001 to 2024, the Indian Air Force participated in 91 international air exercises of which 32 were hosted in India.

== First Edition (2024) ==
The maiden exercise was finally held in the latter half of 2024 in two phases, where the Indian Air Force deployed approximately 40 aircraft each. The first phase was conducted at the Sulur Air Force Station in Tamil Nadu from 6 August to 14 August. The foreign participants of the first phase included France, Germany, Spain and the United Kingdom who contributed about 32 aircraft. Some of the participating air forces, like the XI Squadron and support aircraft of the Royal Air Force, attended the exercise on their return leg from Exercise Pitch Black 2024. The Indian Navy also deployed their MiG-29K carrier-borne fighters in the phase.

The second phase was hosted at the Jodhpur Air Force Stations in Rajasthan from 30 August to 14 September. The participants of the second phase include Australia, Bangladesh, Greece, Japan, Singapore, the United Arab Emirates and the United States. The aircraft deployed by the participating countries included 27 fighters, two refuelling aircraft, two airborne early warning aircraft, and four C-130 Special Forces aircraft. A total of 51 nations were invited while 11 foreign nations will participate in the exercise with their assets and 18 other nations will also be present as observers.

However, Bangladesh Air Force withdrew their C-130 aircraft just before the 2nd phase commenced and Sri Lankan Air Force joined in while BAF officials joined the exercise as observers. Thereafter, Japan confirmed their participation in the exercise few days before the second phase. Russia was unable to participate in the exercise due to the Russo-Ukrainian war.

A total of 150 aircraft were deployed by IAF and other air forces which includes:

- Phase 1
  - Indian Air Force – Tejas Mk 1, Su-30MKI, Mirage 2000, Rafale, Dhruv and transport aircraft.
  - Indian Navy – MiG-29K.
  - German Air Force – 5 Eurofighter Typhoon, 1 Airbus A400M Atlas.
  - French Air and Space Force – 3 Dassault Rafale, 1 Airbus A330 MRTT, 1 Airbus A400M Atlas and 160 personnel.
  - Spanish Air and Space Force – Eurofighter Typhoon.
  - Royal Air Force – 6 Eurofighter Typhoon (No. XI Squadron), 2 Airbus A330 Voyager, 1 Airbus A400M Atlas and 130 personnel.
- Phase 2
  - Indian Air Force – Su-30MKI, Mirage 2000, Rafale, HAL Tejas Mk 1, SEPECAT Jaguar, 3 C-130J, 2 Il-78MKI, 2 Netra AEW&C, Prachand, Apache, and Rudra.
  - Royal Australian Air Force – 3 Boeing EA-18G Growler (No. 6 Squadron) and 120 personnel.
  - United States Air Force – F-16 Fighting Falcon (148th Fighter Wing), A-10 Thunderbolt II (25th Fighter Squadron), Bombardier E-11A, Boeing KC-135 Stratotanker (909th Air Refueling Squadron), Lockheed C-130H Hercules (139th Airlift Wing), Boeing C-17 Globemaster III (62nd Airlift Wing).
  - Hellenic Air Force – 4 F-16 Block 52+ Fighting Falcon (336 Squadron), 2 Lockheed C-130 Hercules.
  - Japan Air Self-Defense Force – 2 Mitsubishi F-2.
  - Republic of Singapore Air Force – F-16 Fighting Falcon.
  - Sri Lanka Air Force – Lockheed C-130K Hercules.
  - United Arab Emirates Air Force – F-16 Fighting Falcon.

The mission profile of the exercise included beyond-visual-range combat missions, large force engagements, air mobility operations, dynamic targeting, low-light operations, and high-value aerial asset protection.

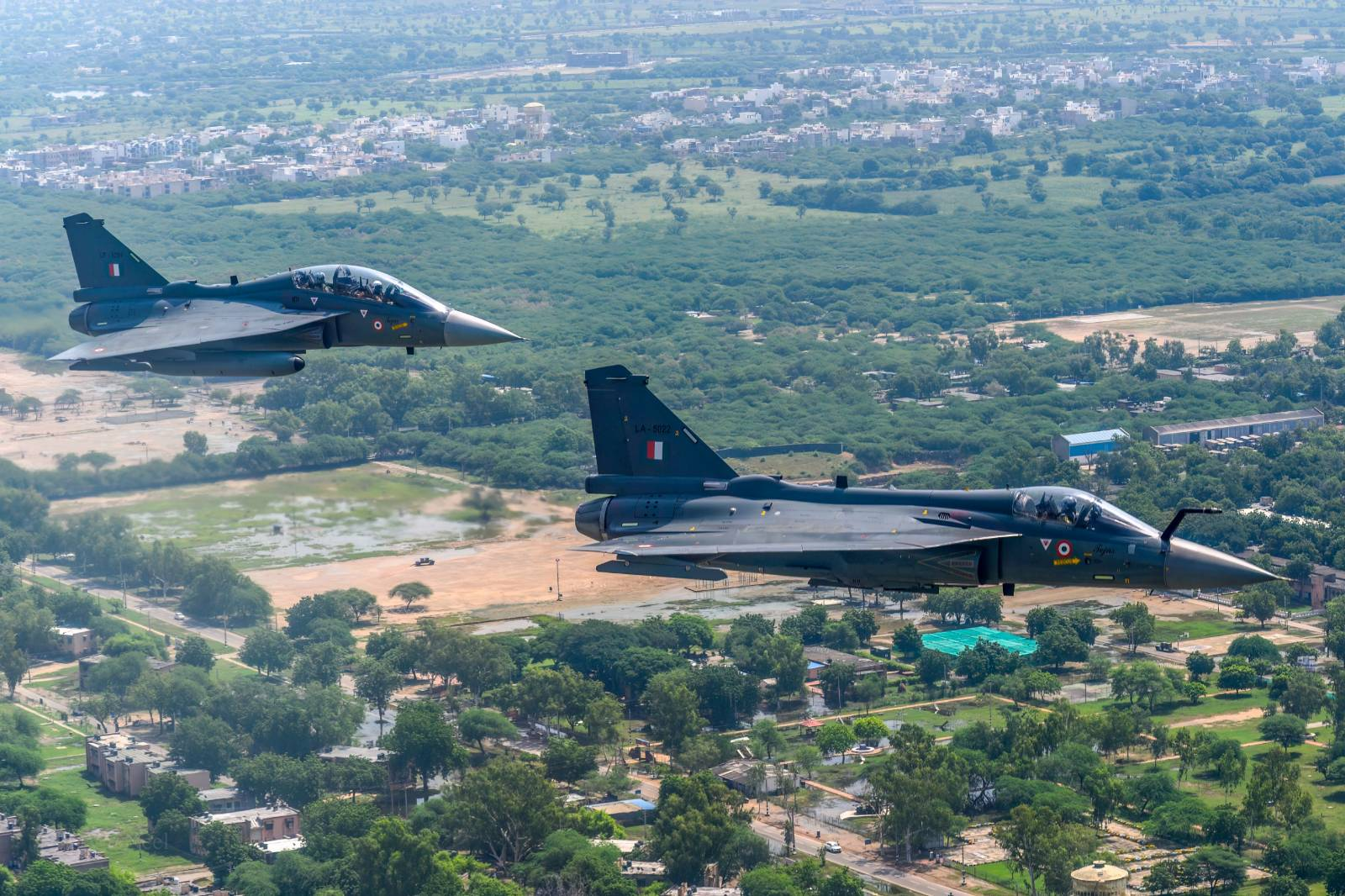
HAL Tejas (LA-5022) and Tejas twin-seater (LT-5201) of No. 18 Squadron IAF during International Defence Aviation Exposition.

On the afternoon of 6 August, the jets from foreign air forces touched down at Sulur AFS where the first phase of the exercise was to be conducted. The jets were escorted by a formation of four HAL Tejas Mk 1 aircraft, one of which was piloted by the then Vice Chief of the Air Staff Air Marshal A. P. Singh. The exercise began with Tejas intercepting German, French and Spanish jets as a part of the training exercise. One of the German Air Force's Eurofighter Typhoon was being piloted by Lieutenant General Ingo Gerhartz, Chief of the German Air Force who flew for five hours to reach India. It was the first time that the German Air Force participated in an exercise in Indian airspace. The phase saw the participation of 10 foreign nations (Spain, Germany, France and United Kingdom) including six observers. The Indian Air Force also hosted the International Defence Aviation Exposition (IDAX) on 9 August showcasing indigenous aviation platforms to the foreign participants. HAL Tejas was assigned to the Red Force (hostile) as well as the Blue Force (friendly) and its capabilities were proven in both the cases. The design capabilities of the fighter jet also received appreciation from the foreign pilots who piloted them. On 13 August, the Chief of French Air Force, General Stéphane Mille and the Chief of German Air Force Lieutenant General Ingo Gerhartz piloted HAL Tejas. The then Indian Air Force Chief Air Chief Marshal V. R. Chaudhari and the Chief of Spanish Air Force Air General Francisco Braco Carbó flew on board a Sukhoi Su-30MKI. An overall of 205 sorties were generated during the phase.

The second phase marked the first military exercise of Greece in India. The contingent from the Hellenic Air Force arrived on 29 August at Jodhpur. According to a report, In the second phase, a total of 40 aircraft including 27 fighter aircraft, two mid-air refuellers, two AEW&CS, three special forces aircraft and helicopters (HAL Dhruv, HAL Prachand and HAL Rudra) participated from the Indian Air Force. On 12 September 2024, Surya Kiran and Sarang aerobatic teams showcased their skills to the participants of the exercise. The senior officials told that the air forces participating in the exercise lacked a common data link which enables operators to share data with friendly foreign nations. IAF also hosted the India Defence Aviation Exposition-II (IDAX-II) from 12 to 14 September. It was inaugurated by Indian Defence Minister Rajnath Singh. A total of 800 sorties were conducted during the phase.

== Second Edition (2026) ==
The second edition is being hosted from 26 September to 12 October 2026 at Jodhpur Air Force Station. Around 80 combat aircraft, including 30 fighter jets and military transport aircraft from foreign air forces, along 1,500 personnel took part in the exercise. The F-35 Lightning II fighter jet made its debut in this edition of the exercise and the aircraft's first tactical participation in an exercise in India.

A NOTAM war issued for the exercise was issued by 22 September. Airspace over the districts of Jaisalmer, Barmer, Phalodi and Jodhpur up to an altitude of 40,000 ft (12,000 m) was reserved for military training purposes. The fighter aircraft are also expected to undertake bombing drills against simulated target in the Pokhran Field Firing Range in the Jaisalmer district ar part of the exercise. Missions in the exercise are expected to include rapid-response capabilities, air-to-air refuelling, precision bombing and complex multinational combat scenarios.

The edition featured eight air forces while 32 countries took part as observers. Further, chiefs of 10 air forces will also witness the exercise. The participating air forces include: –

- Indian Air Force – Su-30MKI, Rafale, Jaguar, Tejas, MiG-29 and Mirage 2000 fighter aircraft along with transport aircraft, helicopters, special operations planes, mid-air refuellers and airborne warning and control system (AWACS) aircraft.
- Bangladesh Air Force – 1 C-130J Super Hercules.
- French Air and Space Force – 4 Rafale, 3 A330 MRTT Phénix, 2 A400M Atlas and 300 personnel.
- German Air Force
- Royal Australian Air Force – C-130J Super Hercules.
- Sri Lanka Air Force
- United Arab Emirates Air Force – 6 F-16 Fighting Falcon.
- United States Air Force – 6 F-35 Lightning II (13th Fighter Squadron), 1 KC-135R Stratotanker (909th Air Refueling Squadron) and over 200 airmen.

The deployment of French air assets, including 4 Rafale fighter aircraft, 3 A330 MRTT Phénix multi-role tanker and 2 A400M Atlas transport aircraft, are part of the Mission Pégase 26. The French Air and Space Force is conducting the seventh edition of Mission Pégase, a long-range air projection exercise, from 8 September to 15 October to demostrate their ability to defend the French overseas territories. The route is covers over 40,000 km (25,000 mi) with nine stopovers.

== See also ==
- List of exercises of the Indian Air Force
- Exercise Red Flag
- Red Flag – Alaska
- Cope India
- Indradhanush (Air Force Exercise)
- Exercise Garuda
- Exercise Pitch Black
