= Air force exercise =

Air force exercise may refers to:

- Exercise Red Flag
- Indradhanush (Air Force Exercise)
- Blue Flag (Israeli Air Force exercise)
- Exercise Pitch Black
- Blue Flag (United States Air Force exercise)
