= Exercise Garuda =

Bilateral training exercise between Indian Air Force and French Air and Space Force

- Status: Active
- Genre: Military exercise
- Frequency: Variable
- Country: India, France
- Years active: 23
- Established: 2003
- Previous event: 2022 (26 October – 12 November)
- Participants: Indian Air Force & French Air and Space Force

Exercise Garuda is a bilateral air force exercise between the Indian Air Force (IAF) and the French Air and Space Force (FASF). The first edition of the exercise was held in 2003 at Gwalior AFS, was witnessed by Chief of Staff of the FASF. The eighth edition, the latest iteration of the exercise, was hosted in France in November 2025. The exercises are held alternatively in India and France air forces.

== List of Garuda exercises ==
Edition	Year	Location	Dates	IAF units	FASF units	Notes	Reference
Garuda I	2003	Gwalior AFS, India					
Garuda II	2005	Istres Air Base, France					
Garuda III	2007	Kalaikunda AFS, India	13 - 25 February	Su-30MKI; Mirage 2000; MiG-27	Mirage 2000-5; M-2000D; E-3F Sentry		
Garuda IV	2010	Istres Air Base, France	14 - 25 June	6 Su-30MKI; 3 Il-78MKI; 1 Il-76	Mirage 2000–5; Rafale; E-3 Sentry; KC-135 Stratotanker	Singapore Air Force participated in the exercise with F-16 Fighting Falcon. Included para jumps by Garud and French Special Forces from Il-76.	
Garuda V	2014	Jodhpur AFS, India	2 - 13 June	4 Su-30MKI; 4 MiG-27; 4 MiG-21; 1 Il-78MKI; 1 A-50EI	4 Rafale; 1 KC-135 Stratotanker		
Garuda VI	2019	Mont-de-Marsan, France	1 - 12 July	Su-30MKI; Rafale; Il-78MKI; C-17 Globemaster III			
Garuda VII	2022	Jodhpur AFS, India	26 October – 12 November	Su-30MKI; Rafale; Tejas; Jaguar; Prachand; Mi-17; Il-78MKI; Netra AEW&C	4 Rafale; 1 Airbus A330 MRTT		
Garuda VIII	2025	Mont-de-Marsan Air Base, France	16 – 27 November	6 Su-30MKI; 3 C-17 Globemaster III; 1 Il-78MKI	10 Rafales; 6 Mirage 2000s; 1 H225M; 1 A330 MRTT; 1 Airbus A400M Atlas	The Indian contingent had reached France on 10 November and returned to Indian on 2 December. The exercise involves over 500 airmen and 25 aircraft.	

== Gallery ==
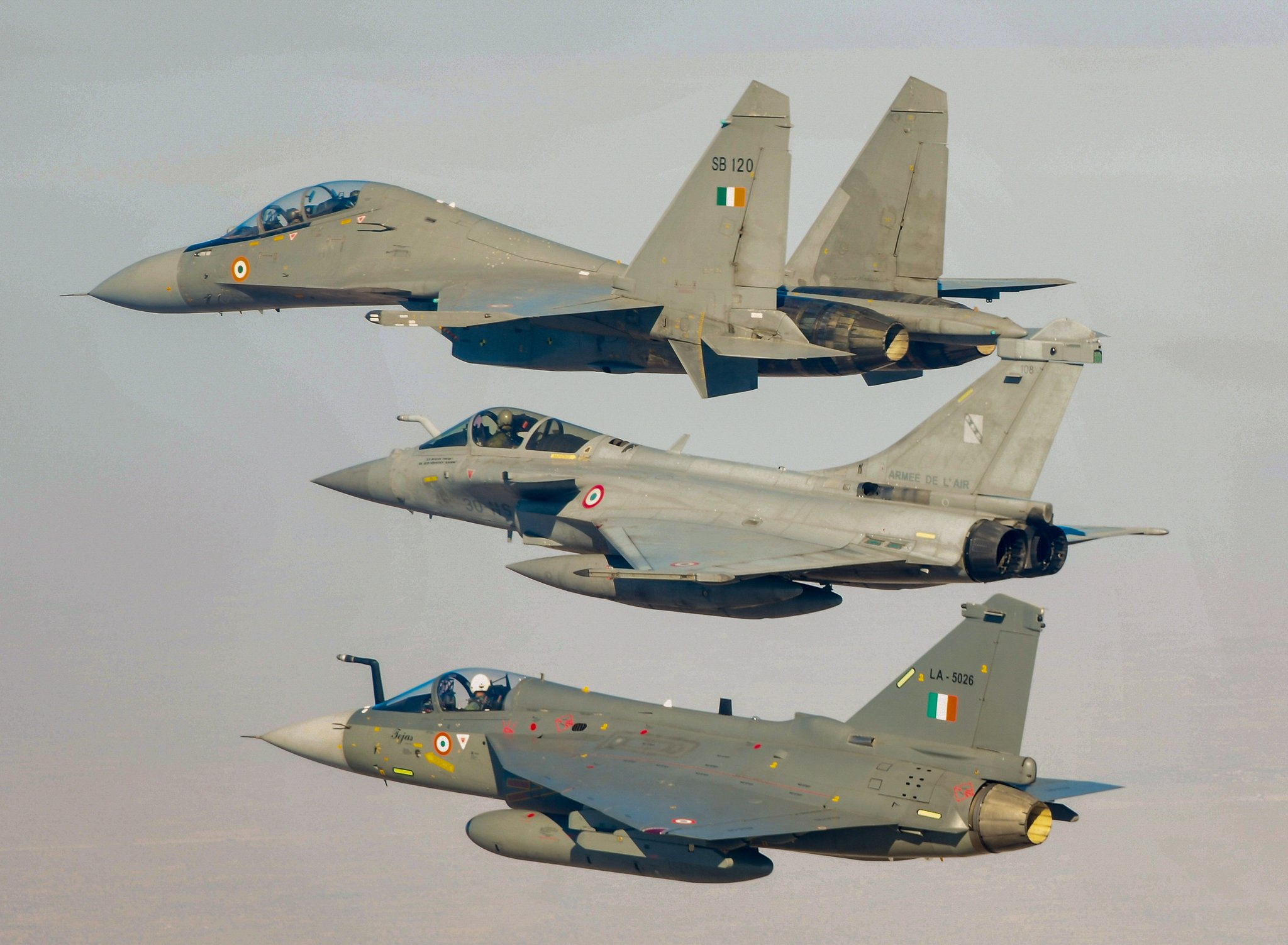
IAF Su-30 MKI, French Rafale and IAF Tejas at Exercise Garuda

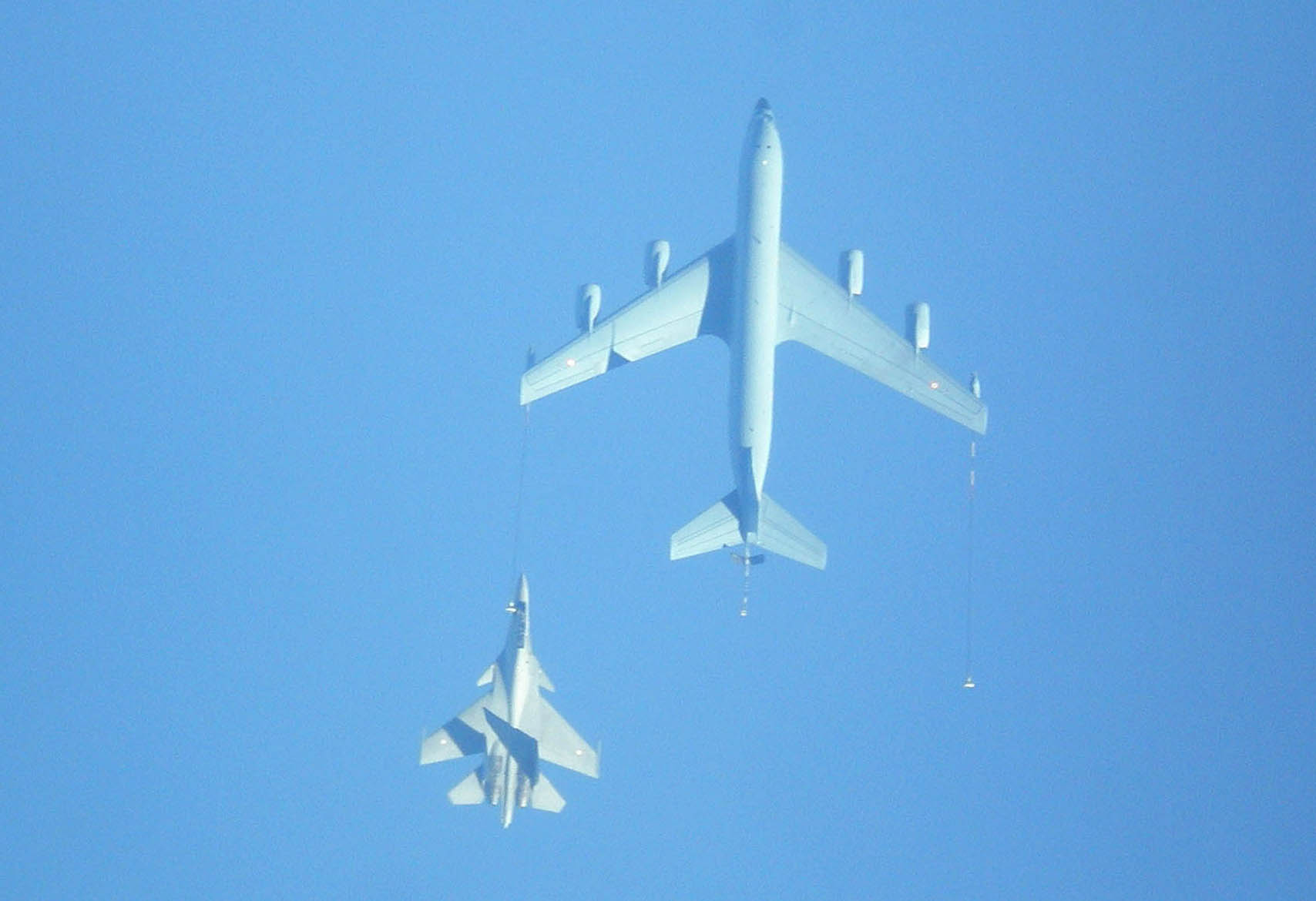
IAF Su-30MKI refuelling from a French C-135F

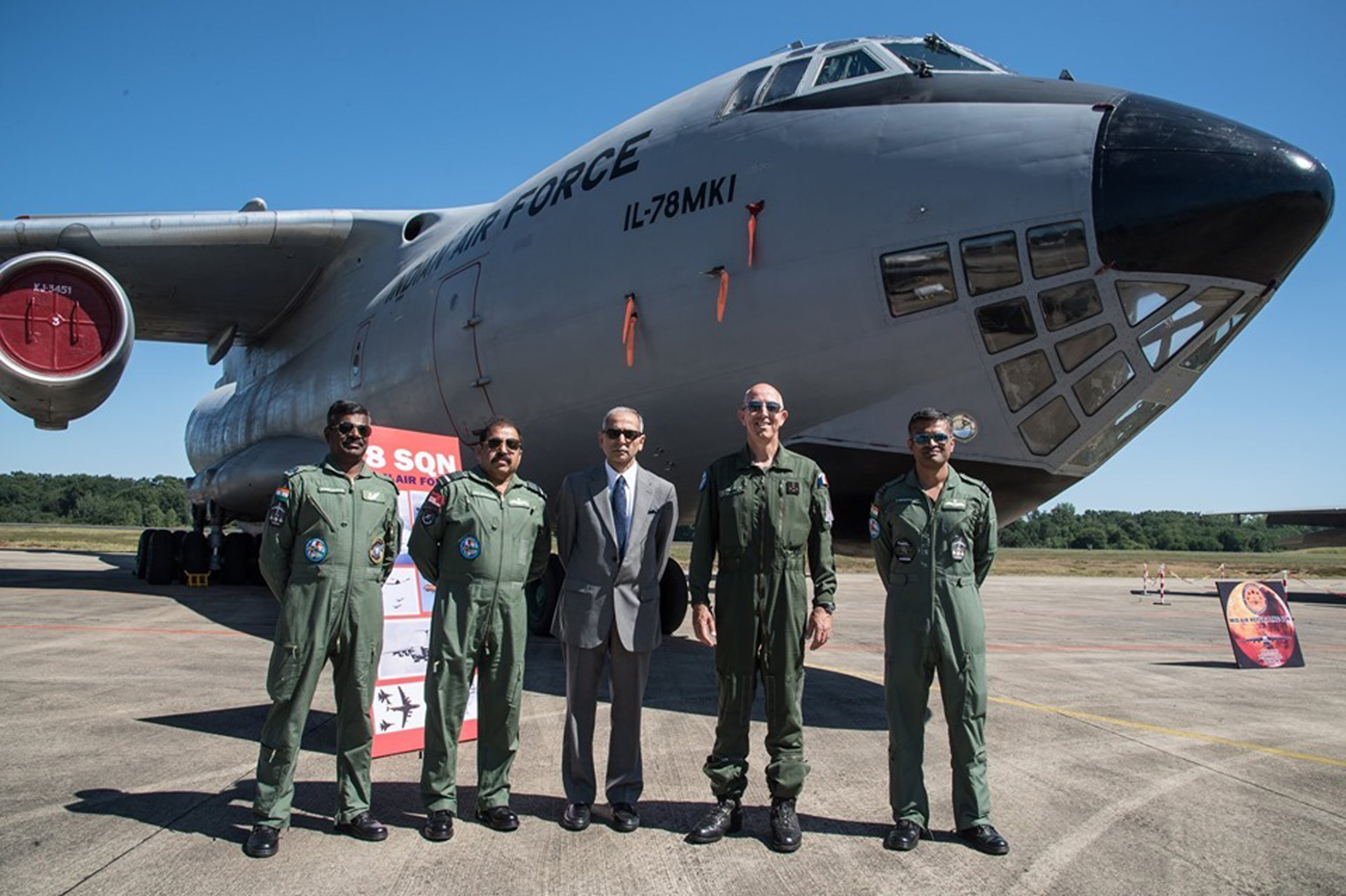
An IL-78 MKI during Exercise Garuda 2019

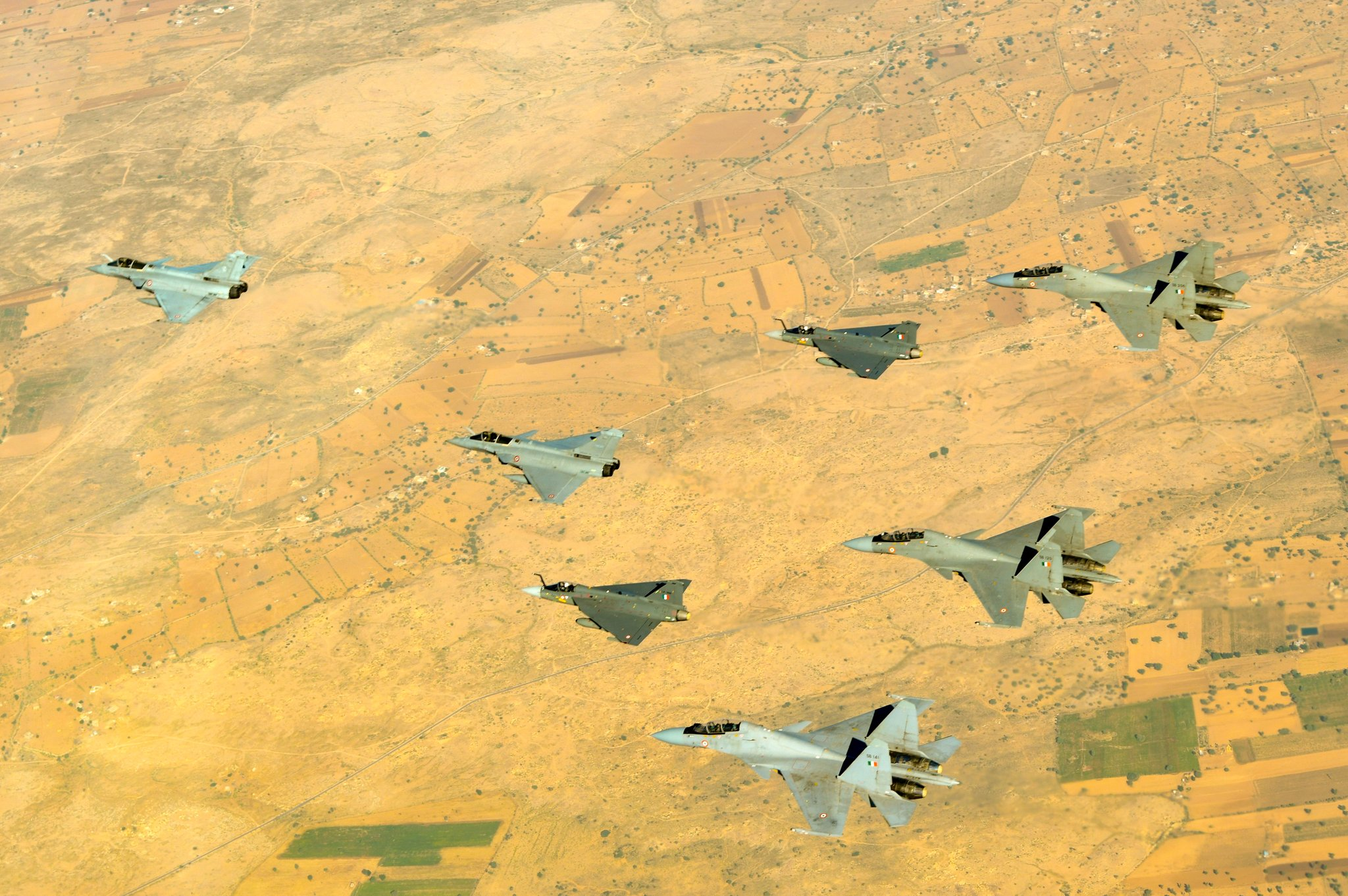
An Indo-French formation (including IAF Su-30 MKI, French Rafale, IAF Tejas) led by Rafale over Thar Desert during Garuda VII 2022.

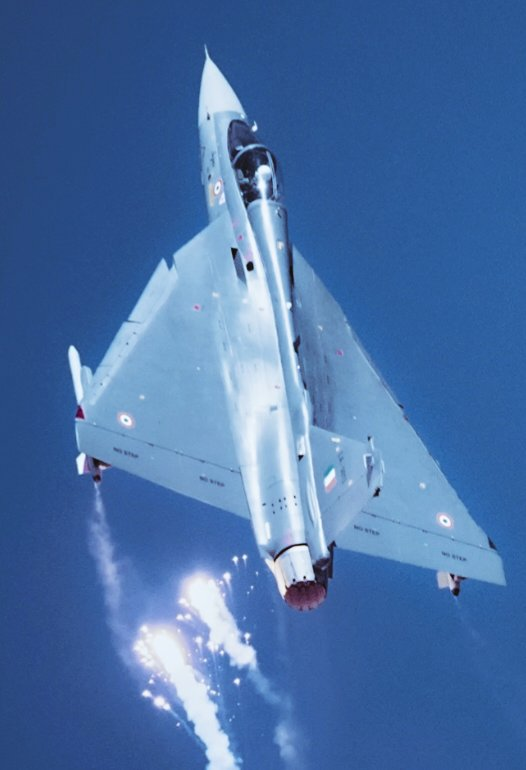
HAL Tejas during the exercise in 2022

== See also ==
- List of exercises of the Indian Air Force
- Exercise Red Flag
- Red Flag – Alaska
- Cope India
- Indradhanush (Air Force Exercise)
- Exercise Tarang Shakti
- Exercise Pitch Black
