= Indradhanush (air force exercise) =

- Status: Active
- Genre: Military exercise
- Frequency: Unknown
- Location: Variable
- Country: India, United Kingdom
- Years active: 20
- Established: 2006
- Most recent: 2015
- Previous event: 2015 (21 – 30 July 2024)
- Next event: N/A
- Participants: Indian Air Force & Royal Air Force

Exercise Indradhanush (Hindi:Rainbow) is a joint air force exercise conducted by the Royal Air Force and the Indian Air Force. The exercise is tasked to enhance mutual operational understanding between the two air forces via close interaction. The exercise started in 2006 and has held four editions so far.

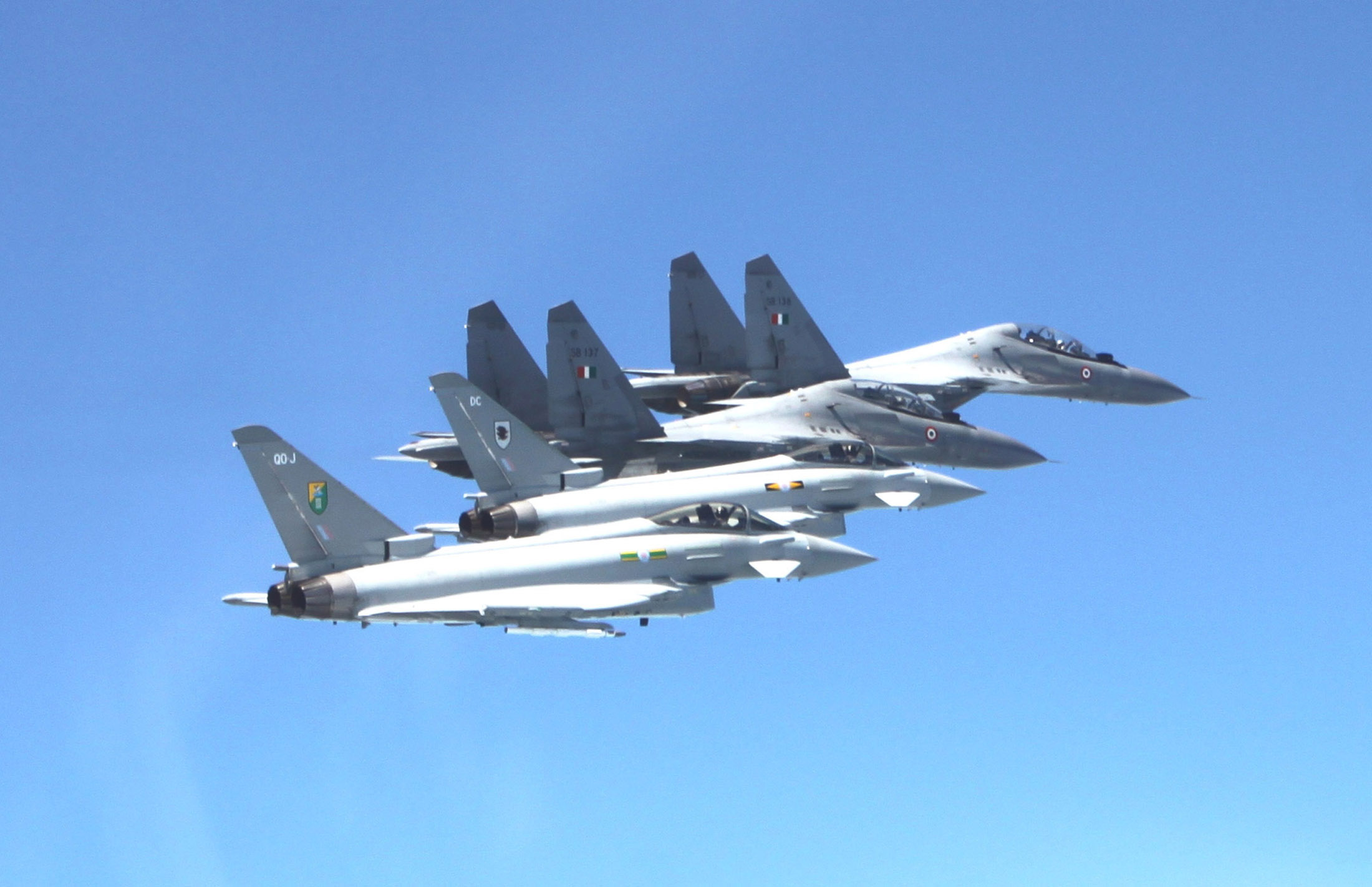
IAF Su-30MKIs and RAF Eurofighter Typhoons during Indradhanush exercise 2010

== 2006 ==
The first edition of the exercise was held between 2–13 October at Gwalior Air Force Station in India.

== 2007 ==
The second edition of the exercise was held at RAF Waddington in United Kingdom. India was represented by air superiority fighter Sukhoi Su-30MKI's and a mid-air refueling tanker Ilyushin IL-78 MKI from No. 78 Squadron. United Kingdom was represented by Panavia Tornado's from the No. 25 Squadron based at RAF Leeming and Eurofighter Typhoon's from No. 7 Squadron based at RAF Coningsby.

== 2010 ==
The third edition of the exercise was held between 18 October - 3 November at Kalaikunda AFS in India. India was represented by fighters Sukhoi Su-30 MKI's, Dassault Mirage 2000's, Mikoyan MiG-27's, a mid-air refueling tanker Ilyushin IL-78 MKI from No. 78 Squadron and an AWAC Beriev A-50 from No. 50 Squadron, both based at Agra AFS. United Kingdom was represented by Eurofighter Typhoon's.

== 2015 ==
The fourth edition of the exercise was held between 21–30 July at RAF Coningsby and RAF Brize Norton in United Kingdom. India was represented by four air superiority fighter Sukhoi Su-30 MKI's from No. 2 Squadron based at Tezpur AFS, one mid-air refueling tanker Ilyushin IL-78 MKI from No. 78 Squadron based at Agra AFS, a military transport aircraft Boeing C-17 Globemaster III from No. 81 Squadron based at Hindon AFS and Garud commandos. United Kingdom was represented by sixteen Eurofighter Typhoon's from No. 3 Squadron based at RAF Coningsby, an Airbus A330 MRTT air refueling tanker, a Lockheed Martin C-130J Hercules transport aircraft and RAF Regiment paratroopers. The fighter jets operated out of RAF Coningsby, the refueling tankers from RAF Brize Norton and the paratroopers from RAF Hunnington. The exercise saw multiple engagements including 1vs1, 1vs2, 4vs4, beyond visual range (BVR), within visual range (WVR), paradropping mission between the two air forces. There was some controversy regarding the final tactical results of the exercise.

== See also ==
- List of exercises of the Indian Air Force
- Exercise Red Flag
- Red Flag – Alaska
- Cope India
- Exercise Tarang Shakti
- Exercise Garuda
- Exercise Pitch Black
