= Cope India =

United States-India Aerial wargame and exercise

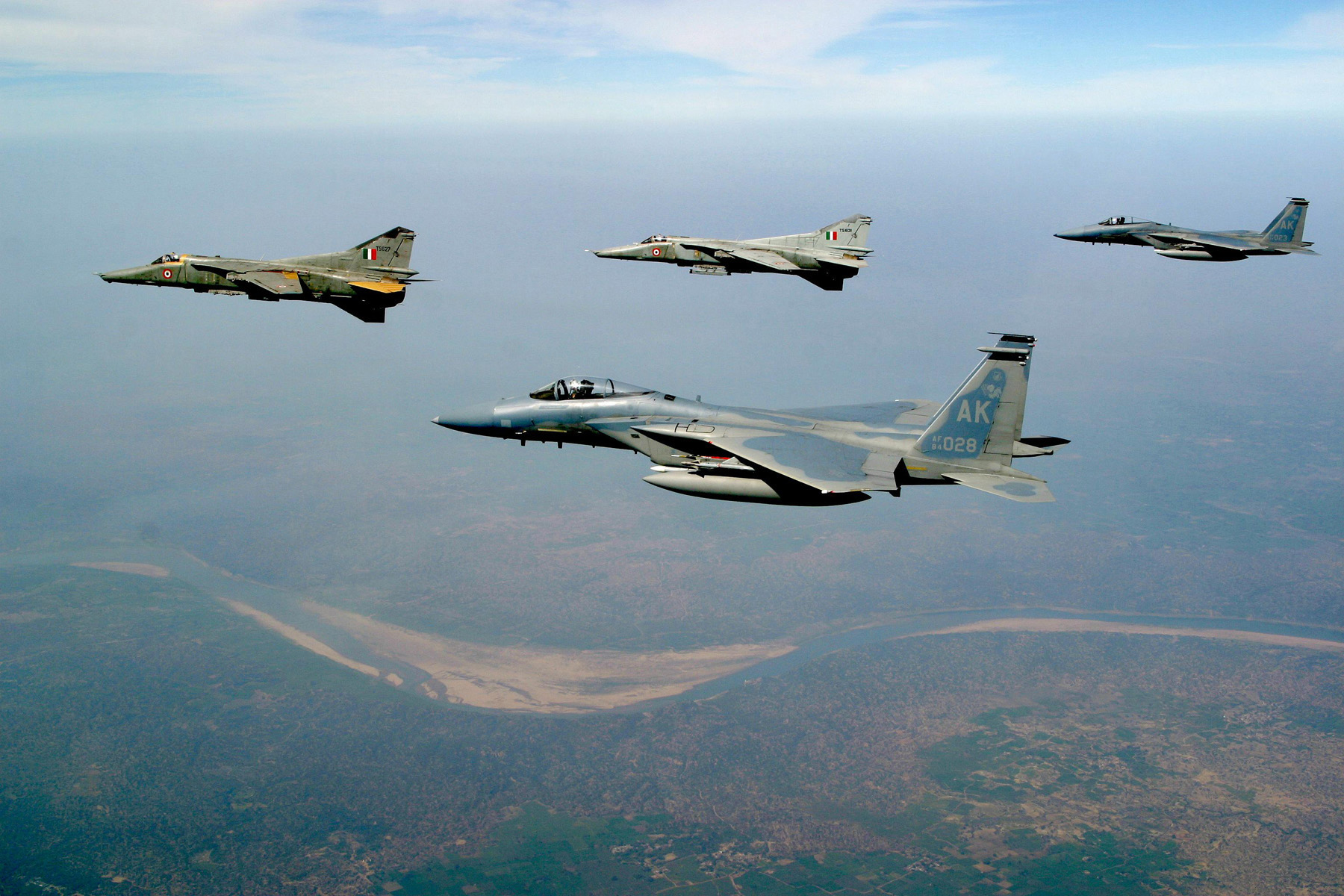
Two USAF F-15 Eagles and two IAF MIG-27 Floggers flying in formation during Cope India 2004.

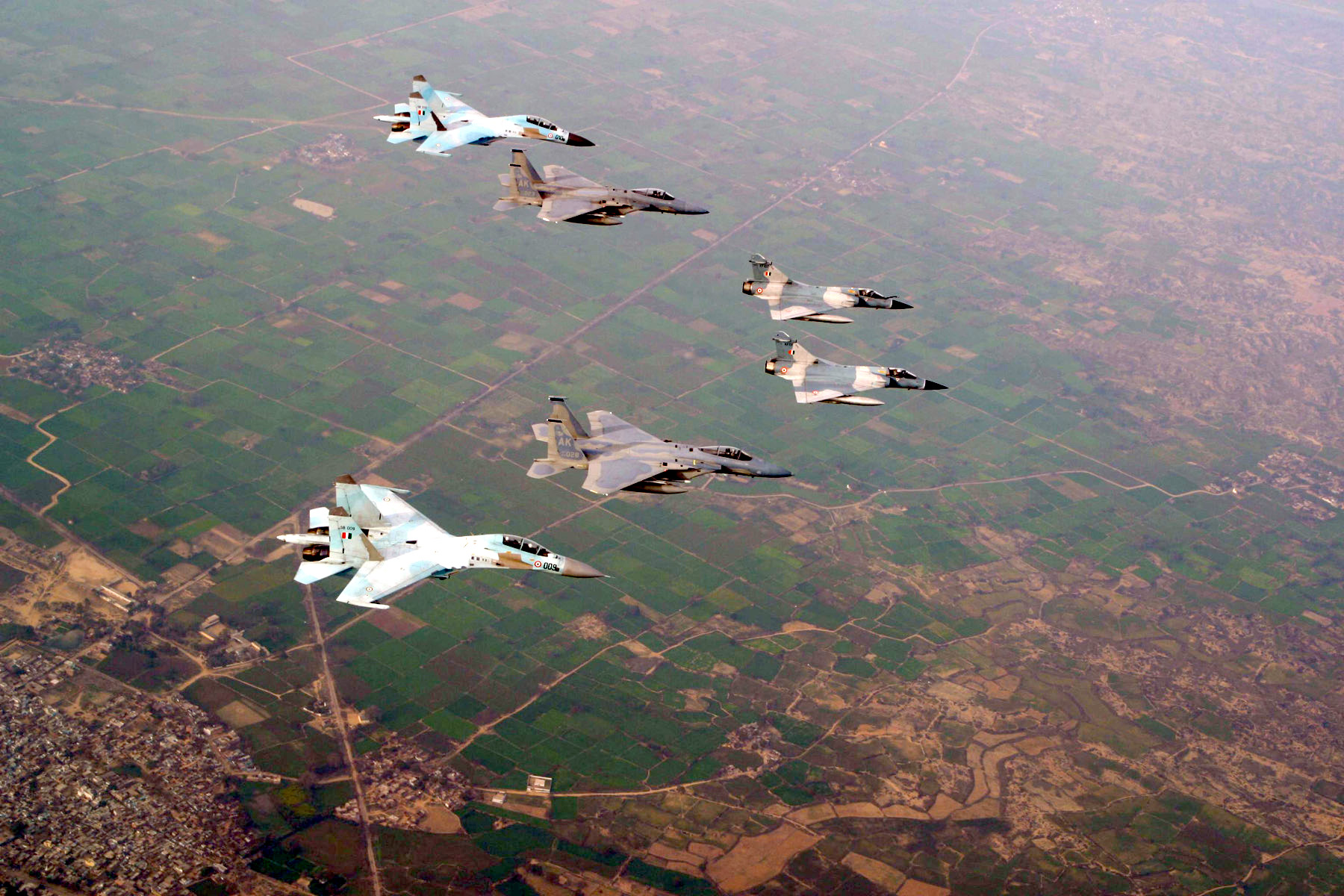
A pair of Su-30Ks and Mirage 2000s from the IAF, flying alongside two USAF F-15s during Cope India 2004.

Cope India Exercise are a series of international Air Force exercises between the Indian Air Force and the United States Air Force conducted on and over Indian soil. The first such exercise, which required many months of preparation, was conducted at the air force station in Gwalior from February 16 through February 27, 2004, with the US Air Force withdrawing troops and aircraft on February 27. The exercise included flight tests, practice and demonstrations as well as lectures on subjects related to aviation. There were also media functions and social interactions among troops of the two countries. After the event was over, the Indian Air Force indicated that "[t]he mutual respect and bonhomie that developed between members of the two sides have cemented a firm foundation for moving ahead towards higher bilateralism." According to press reports, representatives of the United States found it a "positive experience" that led to the re-evaluation of some assumptions about US air tactics. The exercise was repeated in 2005, 2009, 2018 and 2023.

The exercises allow US pilots to go up against Russian Su-30 and French Mirages.

Kalaikunda Air Force Station has hosted several iterations of the Cope India exercise, offering a strategic location for joint Indo-US air operations and tactical exchanges.

== Cope India 2018 (CI18) ==
At the CI18 exercise, which was the fifth iteration, a total of 33 fighter aircraft took part — including 12 F-15s of the United States Air Force (USAF) along with 10 Su-30MKIs, six Jaguars and five Mirage 2000s of the Indian Air Force (IAF). Additionally, an AWACS and refuelling aircraft of the IAF as well as two C-130Js each from IAF and USAF. The exercise was hosted at Kalaikunda Air Force Station and Air Force Station Arjan Singh between 3 and 14 December.

In Cope India 2018, Col Daryl Insley of USAF said while they learn from the IAF, the Indian force also learns from them. Commending the IAF's professionalism, he said, "Their capabilities are equal to how we operate".

== Cope India 2023 (CI23) ==
The sixth edition was hosted at Agra Air Force Station, Kalaikunda Air Force Station and Air Force Station Arjan Singh for over two weeks between 10 and 21 April. The USAF sent its F-15E Strike Eagle fighters, C-130, MC-130J, C-17 and the Rockwell B-1B Lancer bomber aircraft, whereas IAF deployed Rafale, Su-30MKI, Jaguar, C-17 and C-130J aircraft fleet. Aircrew from the Japan Air Self-Defense Force had participated as observers. Colonel Biren Oberoi was appointed as the Director of the exercise. The exercise, which included 564 personnel from the USAF and IAF, culminated on 24 April at Kalaikunda. Two C-130J along with 69 airmen had joined the exercise from Yokota Air Base. A total of 250 Airmen and 10 aircraft participated from the 374th Airlift Wing.

== Cope India 2025 (CI25) ==
The 2025 edition of the exercise was held between 10 and 13 November and was hosted by India. The USAF had deployed the B-1B Lancer bomber aircraft to the Kempegowda International Airport. Meanwhile, the IAF deployed its Su-30MKI, Rafale, and Mirage 2000 aircraft in the exercise.

This edition saw Australia and Japan participating in the exercise as the maiden and second time. The exercise was held almost simultaneously with the naval exercise, Malabar, which also included the same set of four countries as part of the Quad.

== See also ==
- List of exercises of the Indian Air Force
- Exercise Red Flag
- Red Flag – Alaska
- Exercise Garuda
- Indradhanush (Air Force Exercise)
- Exercise Tarang Shakti
- Exercise Pitch Black
