= Exercise Aakraman =

Wargame Exercise of Indian Air Force

Exercise Aakraman is a military exercise conducted by the Indian Air Force (IAF) aimed at enhancing the operational readiness and offensive capabilities of its combat aircraft fleets. The term 'Aakraman' (आक्रमण), which translates to "attack" or "assault" in English, reflects the aggressive nature of the exercise. It focused primarily on offensive operations, including precision strikes, air superiority, and complex tactical missions, while ensuring effective coordination among various branches of the Indian military.

It involves the execution of sophisticated aerial missions, such as precision ground attacks, electronic warfare, and counter-air operations, in dynamic and challenging combat environments. These operations are carried out across diverse terrains, including plains, deserts, and mountainous regions, to mimic the complexities of real-world conflict.

Aakraman ia a critical component of the IAF’s ongoing efforts to modernize its forces, test new systems, and maintain readiness for complex military engagements in both peace and wartime.

== Objective ==
Aakramans' core objective is to simulate real combat scenarios, thereby improving the IAF's preparedness for high-intensity warfare situations. It serves as a platform to test the IAF’s ability to conduct complex, multi-domain warfare by integrating air, land, and sea assets in real-time operations. The exercise also underscores the IAF's commitment to modernizing its aviation technology and enhancing its ability to engage in fast-paced, high-stakes combat situations. It emphasized strategic repositioning of assets from various airbases across India, ensuring comprehensive operational maneuvers and inter-theatre mobility.

In addition to air operations, Aakraman incorporated cross-service training with the Indian Army and Navy, ensuring joint operational readiness. These integrated exercises enhanced the IAF’s ability to engage in coordinated, multi-domain operations across diverse military platforms.

== 2019 ==
During the 2019 edition of Aakraman, the IAF showcased the precision strike capabilities of its Dassault Mirage 2000 fighter aircraft. This edition also marked the integration of advanced systems that served as force multipliers, notably the S-400 Triumf air defense system. The S-400 significantly strengthened India’s air defense network by countering advanced aerial threats, including high-value airborne platforms such as Airborne Early Warning and Control (AEW&C) aircraft. This system contributed to a more robust, layered air defense architecture, reinforcing India’s deterrence and defensive posture.

== 2025 ==
Aakraman 2025, beginning in late April, is being conducted amidst heightened tensions between India and Pakistan, following a terrorist attack in Pahalgam. However, it is stated as a routine training drill. This iteration of the exercise is receiving close oversight from the IAF's Air Headquarters, underlining its strategic importance. The exercise involves elite IAF pilots, referred to as "Top Guns," executing advanced combat missions under the supervision of highly qualified instructors. These drills are designed to simulate high-intensity conflict scenarios, enhancing both offensive and defensive capabilities. This is carried out in the central sector where the IAF is showcasing the strength of its frontline combat fleet, including the Dassault Rafale, Sukhoi Su-30MKI, Mikoyan-Gurevich MiG-21s, the S-400 air defence system, AEW&C, mid-air refuellers, transport aircraft and Garud commandos among others.

The 2025 edition also builds upon the operational successes of the February 2019 air strikes, which were conducted in the aftermath of the Pulwama attack. These strikes, which involved deep penetration operations targeting terrorist infrastructure across the Line of Control in Pakistan, marked a significant shift in the IAF's operational capabilities. Since then, the induction of the Dassault Rafale aircraft has further reinforced the IAF’s combat posture, restoring and enhancing India’s qualitative edge in regional air superiority. The Rafale fleet’s advanced capabilities, including sophisticated avionics, weapon systems, and multi-role versatility, are central to strengthening India's defense capabilities and ensuring a technologically advanced air combat posture.

== See also ==
- List of exercises of the Indian Air Force
