= Akash Ganga =

Indian Air Force skydiving team

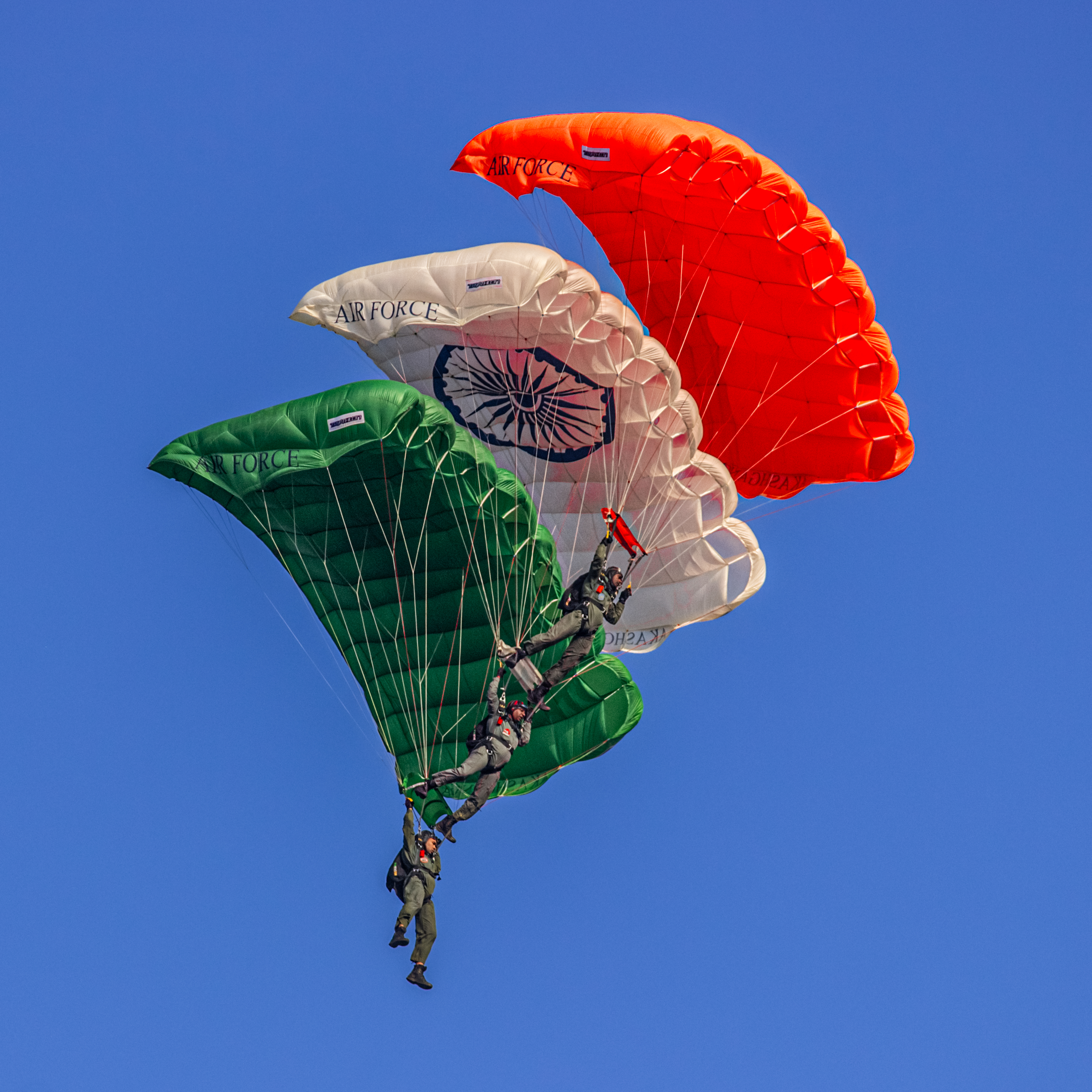
3 members of Akash Ganga skydiving team of the IAF carrying the Indian Flag.

Akashganga is the Skydiving Display Team of the Indian Air Force. It was created on 10 August 1987, although its origins may date back to 1970s. Akash Ganga can be roughly translated in Hindi as "The Ganga of the sky", an ancient Sanskrit name for the Milky Way as viewed from the Earth.

== Formation ==
The IAF Akashganga Team was started in the 1970s as practice to prepare for war. It is based at Agra Air Force Station. The team was formed began in 1987.

The team consists of Parachute Jump Instructors of the Paratroopers’ Training School of the Indian Air Force.
