= HAL Rudra =

Attack variant of the HAL Dhruv helicopter

Rudra
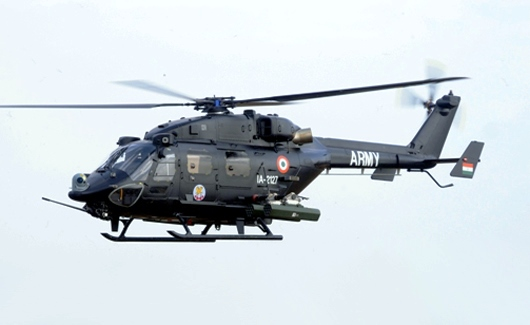
- HAL Rudra of Indian Army in flight

General information
- Type: Armed helicopter
- National origin: India
- Manufacturer: Hindustan Aeronautics Limited
- Designer: Rotary Wing Research and Design Centre
- Status: In service
- Primary users: Indian Army Indian Air Force
- Number built: 91

History
- Manufactured: 2007–present
- Introduction date: 2012
- First flight: 16 August 2007
- Developed from: HAL Dhruv

The HAL Rudra (lit. 'Roaring') also known as ALH-WSI, is an armed version of the HAL Dhruv utility helicopter which is designed and produced by the Indian aerospace manufacturer Hindustan Aeronautics Limited (HAL).

The Rudra was developed in parallel to the HAL Light Combat Helicopter (LCH), a more extensive attack helicopter developed from the Dhruv. Extensive changes from the Dhruv were avoided to produce the Rudra with the express purpose of providing an indigenous armed helicopter faster than the LCH programme could do so. The Mark III variant features the sensors and mission equipment, but lacked weaponry; the Rudra Mark IV is provisioned with various armaments. The Rudra is equipped with forward looking infrared (FLIR), day-and-night optical cameras, and a Thermal Imaging Sights Interface; armed models feature a 20 mm turret gun, 70 mm rocket pods, anti-tank guided missiles and air-to-air missiles. Work on the programme started in December 1998, and the prototype Rudra conducted its maiden flight on 16 August 2007.

Between 2011 and 2013, extensive flight testing of the Rudra took place, during which it was proved to have largely fulfilled or surpassed set requirements. Its primary customer is the Indian Army, who took delivery of the first pair of Rudra helicopters in February 2013, the same month in which the type attained Initial Operational Clearance (IOC). In addition to the Indian Army, both the Indian Air Force and Indian Navy have taken interest in the type.

== Design and development ==
Amid the development of the more comprehensive Light Combat Helicopter, an attack-orientated derivative of the HAL Dhruv utility helicopter, Indian Army officials concluded that there was value in procuring an armed model of the Dhruv. By intentionally avoiding any non-essential major modification to the original airframe, this armed Dhruv could be developed and delivered relatively quickly. The concept was initially referred to as the Dhruv-WSI (Weapons System Integrated). Thereafter, the name Rudra was adopted. Development of the Rudra was officially sanctioned during December 1998.

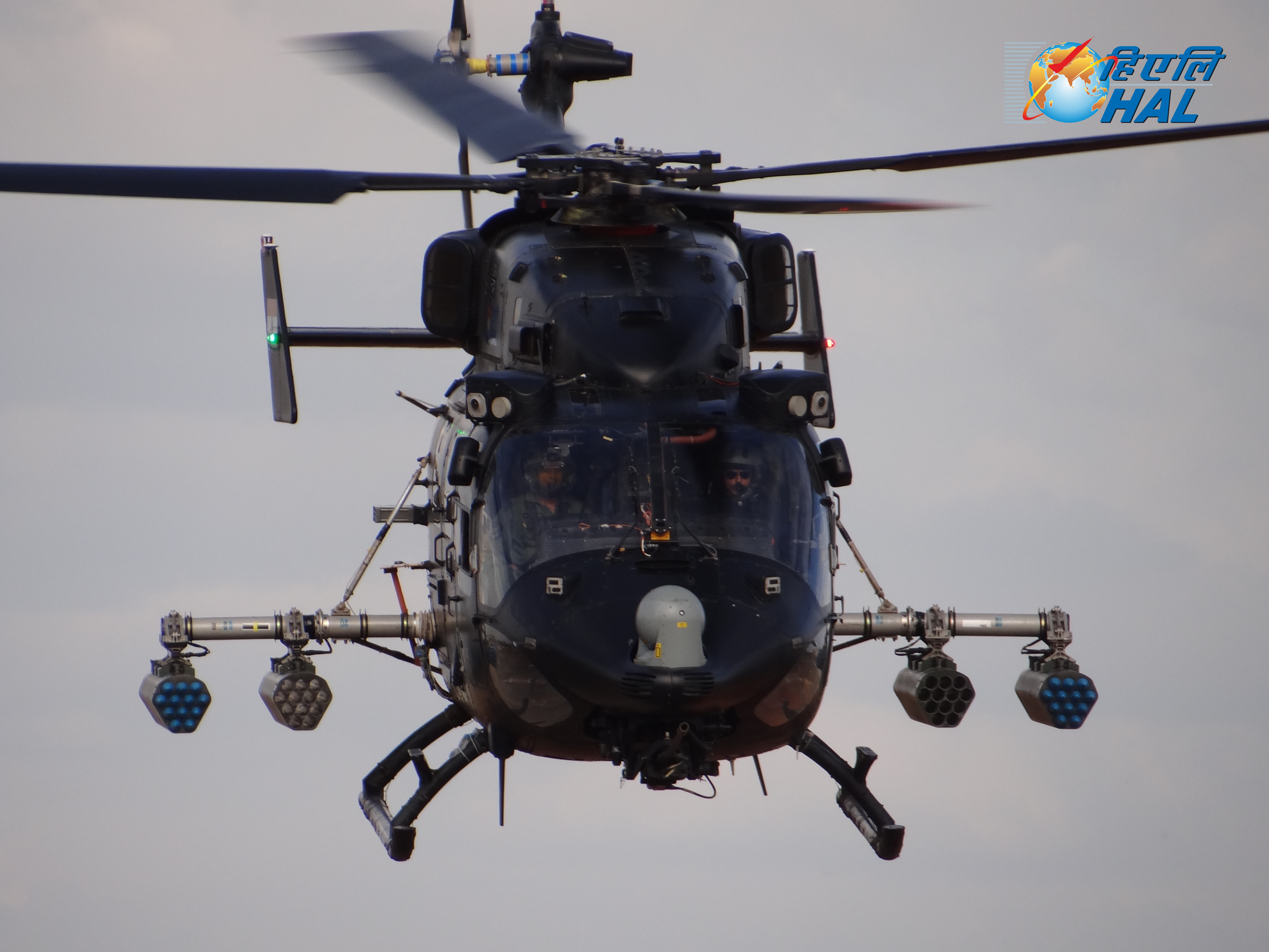
Head-on view of a Rudra

The Rudra features integrated sensors, weapons and an electronic warfare suite; it is also furnished with an upgraded version of the glass cockpit used in the HAL Dhruv Mk III. These sensors include stabilised day and night cameras, infrared imaging, as well as laser ranging and designation. It has an Integrated Defensive Aids Suite (IDAS) from Saab AB, with an electronic warfare self-protection system that is fully integrated into the glass cockpit. Onboard self-defence systems include radar and missile detectors, IR jammer, chaff and flare dispensers. The helicopter can be used in both unarmed and armed roles that include aerial reconnaissance, troop transport, anti-tank warfare and close air support.

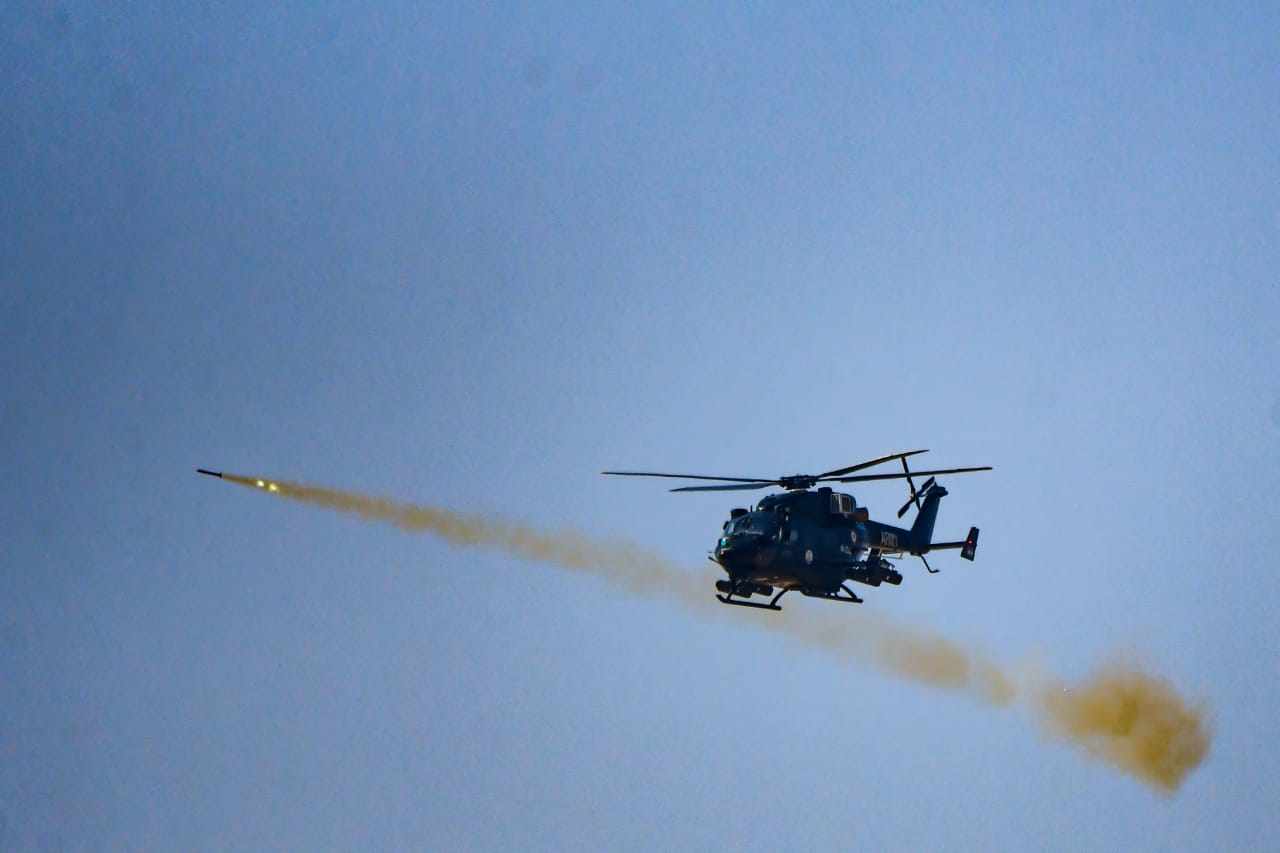
HAL Rudra firing FZ275 LGR rockets at Exercise Yudh Abhyas

During July 2005, the project was rescoped to include integration of additional systems along with the integration of a higher powered model of the HAL/Turbomeca Shakti turboshaft engine. Post-revision, the cost of the Rudra programme was reported to be Rs 710.29 Cr in April 2007; at this point, the scheduled completion date was stated to be July 2008. On 16 August 2007, the prototype Rudra conducted its maiden flight.

In September 2011, the Rudra underwent integration trials of its armaments and electro-optical systems, which included a final round of weapon firing trials, such as of its 20 mm turret gun. Both 70 mm rockets and MBDA Mistral air-to-air missiles were also test fired during November 2011. The helicopter reportedly exceeded both the payload and performance requirements while flying at an altitude of 6 km.

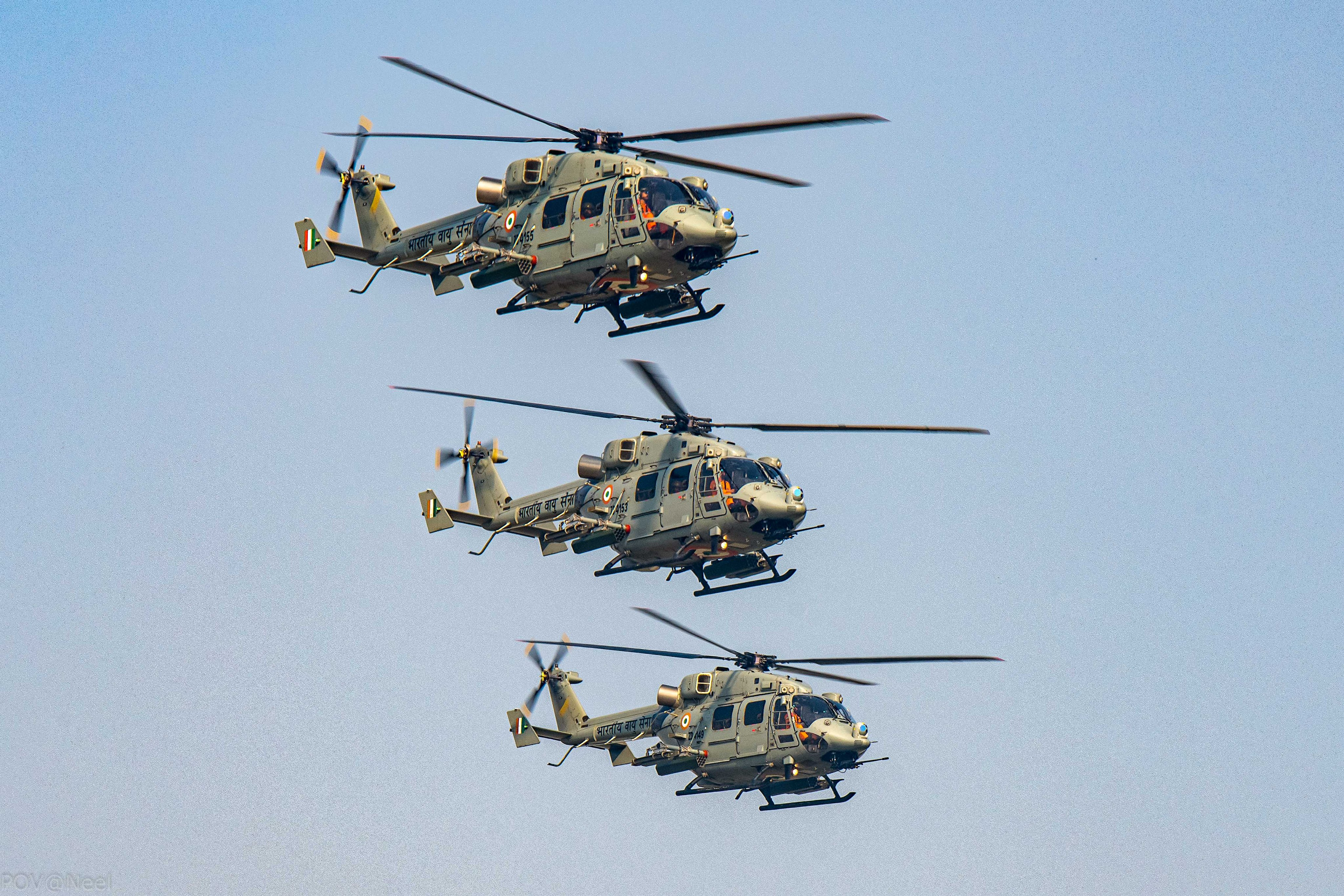
Formation flight of three Indian Air Force Rudras

During September 2012, ground tests were completed using the first production Rudra. It was armed with a turret gun, rockets, air-to-air missiles and could carry air-to-ground missiles like the anti-tank helicopter-launched Nag. Accordingly, HAL was awarded with a combined order for 76 Rudras, these were destined for the Indian Army, who were the type's primary customer, as well as the Indian Air Force (IAF).

Between 2012 and 2013, the Rudra underwent a series of flight trials on behalf of the Indian Navy; it was found that the helicopter was suitable for conducting coastal surveillance operations. The service was reportedly impressed with the capability of the Rudra's sensors to track ships at up to 14 km away. The image quality of the sensors was described as good enough to even read the name of ships at those ranges, and the Navy was keen to order at least 20 helicopters for its own purposes. Prior to this round of testing, the Rudra had been evaluated for the anti-submarine warfare (ASW) mission, weapons tests had included the firing of both torpedoes and depth charges, which had reportedly been completed successfully.

In 2026, DRDO was working on the development of a helicopter-borne laser weapon pod for counter unmanned air system operations from HAL Rudra. The development being undertaken jointly by CHESS, IRDE and the industrial partners is expected to receive an airworthiness certification by the CEMILAC by 2029-end.

== Operational history ==
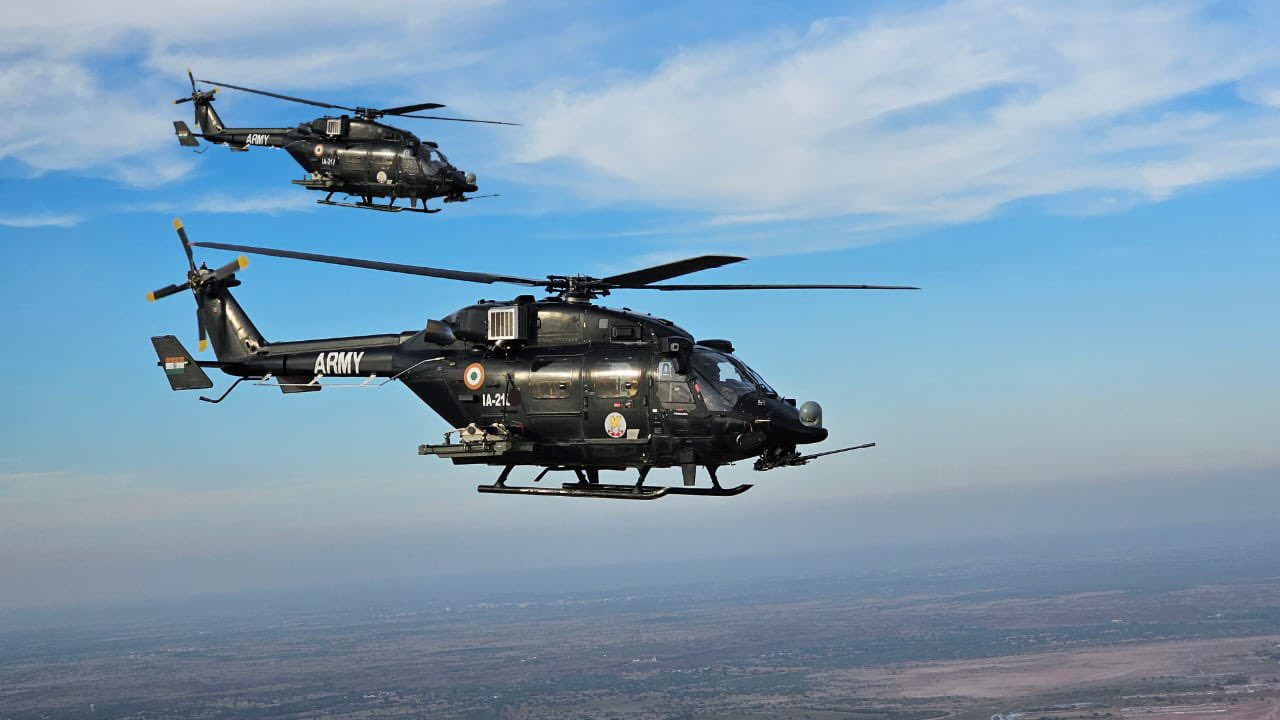
Rudra attack helicopters during Exercise Vayushakti 2024.

The Rudra was expected to attained Initial Operational Clearance (IOC) by late 2012, while deliveries of production helicopters were set to commence by 2013. On 4 February 2013, at the Aero India trade show, it was announced that the HAL Rudra Mk IV had achieved IOC, and that a pair of helicopters had been handed over to the Indian Army. The Indian Army continued to take deliveries of the type; by 2017, 22 armed Rudras had reportedly been delivered to the service.

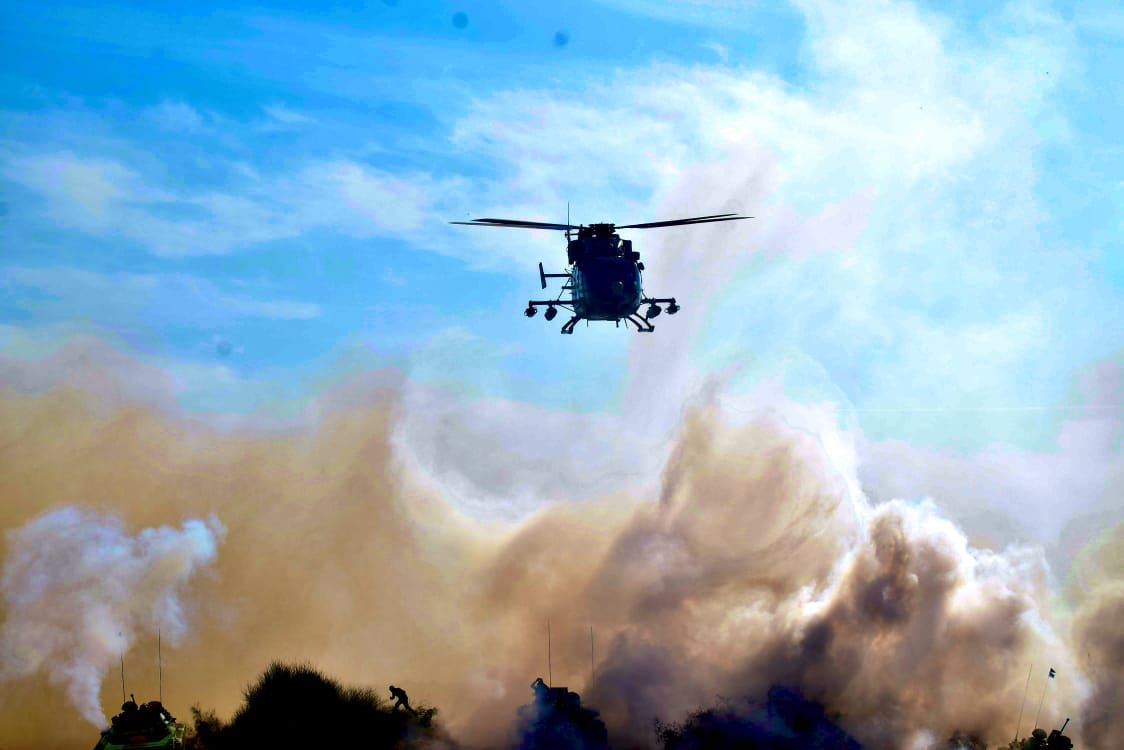
HAL Rudra providing close air support during Exercise Gagan Strike

The Indian Air Force has also received eight armed Rudras by 2017. By 2021, while the more comprehensive LCH was now available, there was still reportedly demand to continue ordering additional Rudras on account of its comparatively cheaper unit cost. In April 2022, a planned $1.1 billion procurement of 48 Russian Mil Mi-17V-5 helicopters intended for the Indian Air Force (IAF), federal interior ministry, and various paramilitaries was scrapped amid an initiative to buy the locally-produced Dhruv and Rudra models instead. It was reported that the Indian Air Force had around 14 to 16 Rudra copters in service and was planning to acquire three more squadrons of the type. Meanwhile, the Army had received 65 Rudra and was awaiting the delivery of 13 more units.

In 2026, Captain Hansja Sharma of the 251 Army aviation squadron became the first woman HAL Rudra pilot.

== Variants ==
A HAL Rudra of the Indian Army Aviation Corps firing a Helina anti-tank missile.

Rudra, or ALH-WSI (Weapon Systems Integrated) has two main versions.

- Mark III: This version has Electronic Warfare, countermeasures, sensors and targeting systems installed, but does not feature weapons. Utility roles of Defence Services suited for high altitude operations.
- Mark IV: This version has a French Nexter 20 mm turret gun, Belgian 70 mm rockets, and MBDA air-to-air missiles, and the Helina anti-tank missile. Armed variant for Attack, Close Air Support and High altitude operations.

== Operators ==
India

- Indian Air Force – ~14–16 helicopters. Three more squadrons planned.
  - No. 116 Helicopter Unit
- Indian Army – 75 helicopters, as of June 2021.
  - Nagtalao (Jodhpur) Military Base
    - 251 Army Aviation Squadron "Desert Devils"
  - Likabali Army Aviation Base
    - 252 Army Aviation Squadron "Tridents"
  - Mamun Military Base
    - 254 Army Aviation Squadron
  - Tanda Army Aviation Base
    - 257 Army Aviation Squadron "The Destroyers"
  - Haldwani Army Aviation Base
    - 301 Army Aviation Squadron "Pratham Vishesh" (Special Ops)

== Accidents and incidents ==
- 3 August 2021: an Army Rudra helicopter crashed into the water near Ranjit Sagar Dam Lake. The helicopter belonged to the Pathankot-based 254 ALH-WSI squadron and was carrying out a routine training mission involving low-level flying over the lake and had two officers — a Lt Col A S Bath and a Capt Jayant Joshi. The crash led to their death and their bodies were recovered from water after 12 and 76 days of the incident, respectively. Being an Army chopper, it lacked an emergency flotation gear (EFG). The search and rescue mission involved specialized divers and Dhruv and Cheetah helicopters and, later, a heavy-lift Chinook helicopter also joined the search.
- 21 October 2022: an Army Rudra, inducted in 2015, crashed killing two pilots and three soldiers onboard. The crash occurred to the south of Tuting area in Arunachal Pradesh’s Upper Siang district around 10:43 am IST. A joint Army-Air Force search and rescue operation was launched. The crash was attributed to technical issues.

== Specifications ==
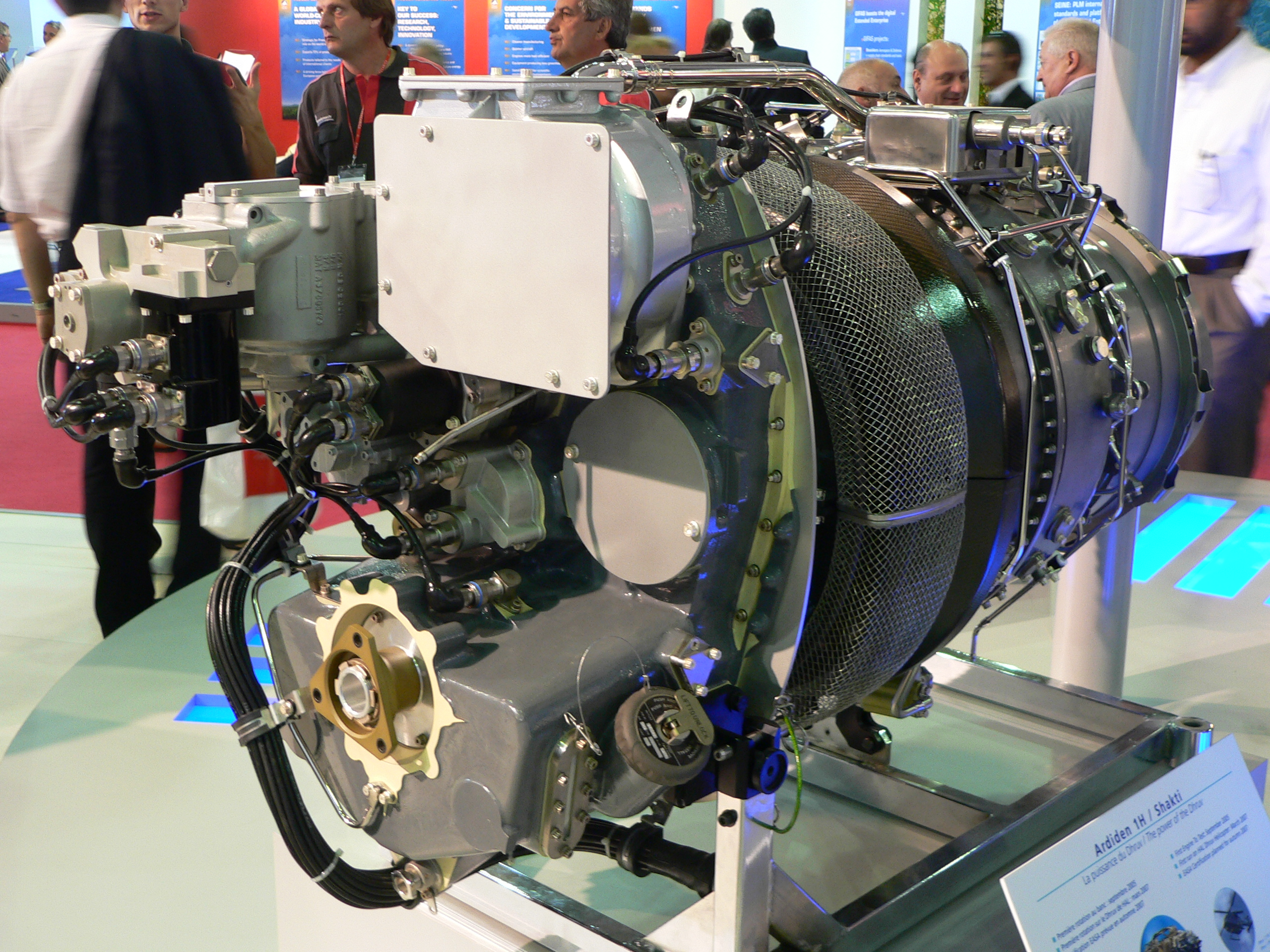
HAL/Turbomeca Shakti engine

Data from Jane's All the World's Aircraft, HAL

General characteristics

- Crew: Two pilots
- Capacity: 12 passengers (14 passengers in high density seating)
- Length: 15.87 m (52 ft 1 in)
- Width: 3.15 m (10 ft 4 in)
- Height: 4.98 m (16 ft 4 in)
- Gross weight: 4,445 kg (9,800 lb)
- Max takeoff weight: 5,800 kg (12,787 lb)
- Fuel capacity: 1,055 kg (2,326 lb)
- Powerplant: 2 × HAL/Turbomeca Shakti-1H turboshaft, 1,068 kW (1,432 shp) each
- Main rotor diameter: 13.2 m (43 ft 4 in)
- Main rotor area: 136.85 m^{2} (1,473.0 sq ft)

Performance

- Maximum speed: 280 km/h (175 mph, 151 kn)
- Cruise speed: 245 km/h (153 mph, 132 kn)
- Never exceed speed: 292 km/h (182 mph, 157 kn)
- Range: 590 km (368 mi, 318 nmi)
- Ferry range: 630 km (394 mi, 340 nmi)
- Endurance: 3.8 hours
- Service ceiling: 6,100 m (20,000 ft)
- Rate of climb: 10.33 m/s (2,033 ft/min)
- Disk loading: 40.19 kg/m^{2} (8.23 lb/sq ft)

Armament

- 1 × 20 mm M621 cannon on Nexter THL-20 turret
- 4 × Mistral
- 48 × FZ275 LGR
- 8 × Dhruvastra (User trials completed, induction soon.)

Avionics

- Elbit CoMPASS optoelectronic suite for reconnaissance and target acquisition
- RWS-300 radar warning system or LWS-310 laser warning system
- MAW-300 missile approach warning system
- Saab AB IDAS-3 self-protection suite
- BOP-L ECM dispenser

== See also ==
Related development

- HAL Dhruv
- HAL Prachand

Aircraft of comparable role, configuration, and era

- IAR 330 SOCAT
- KAI LAH
- W-3PL Głuszec

Related lists

- List of rotorcraft
