= Gwalior Airport =

Airport in Gwalior, Madhya Pradesh, India

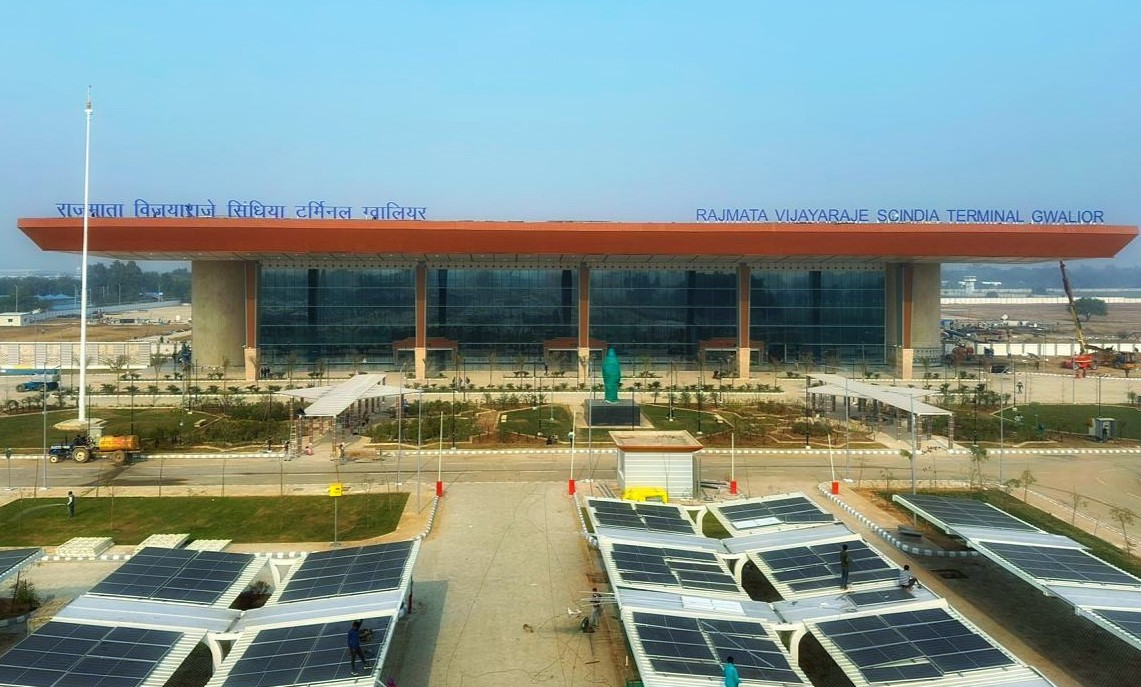
- IATA: GWL; ICAO: VIGR

Summary
- Airport type: Public
- Owner: Airports Authority of India
- Operator: Airports Authority of India
- Serves: Gwalior
- Location: Maharajpura, Gwalior, Madhya Pradesh, India
- Opened: 1940; 86 years ago
- Time zone: Indian Standard Time (+5:30)
- Elevation AMSL: 617 ft (188 m)
- Coordinates: 26°17′36″N 078°13′40″E
- Website: Gwalior Airport

Map
- Location within Madhya Pradesh Location within India

Runways
Direction	Length		Surface
Direction	ft	m	Surface
06L/24R	9,000	2,743	Asphalt
06R/24L	9,000	2,743	Asphalt

Statistics (April 2025 – March 2026)
- Passengers: 2,90,660 (▼13.2%)
- Aircraft movements: 2,490 (▼22.2%)
- Cargo tonnage: 0 ( 0%)
- Source: AAI

Gwalior Airport (IATA: GWL, ICAO: VIGR), also known as Rajmata Vijayaraje Scindia Terminal, is a domestic airport managed and operated by the Airports Authority of India serving the city of Gwalior, Madhya Pradesh, India. It is located in Maharajpura, 10 km (6 mi) north-east of Gwalior. It is one of the four major airports in Madhya Pradesh. The airport is named after Vijaya Raje Scindia, one of the founding members of Bharatiya Janata Party, former prominent Member of Parliament and Maharani of the erstwhile Gwalior State ruled by the Scindia dynasty. It is the oldest and largest airport of Madhya Pradesh in terms of size and only airport in Central India which has two runways. It is the closest airport to the famous Kuno National Park.

The airport is spread over 760.7 acres (307.8 hectares). The Airports Authority of India (AAI) has taken up the work for expansion of the airport. The new terminal building is spread over 20,000 m^{2} (220,000 sq ft), completed in 16 months and can handle 1,400 peak hour passengers, which is 3 times more than the terminal building it replaced. Ancillary buildings, car parking, city-side development and other associated works were completed at the same time as the new terminal building together with the construction of the new apron and the taxiways, including associated works for parking of 13 narrow body or small aircraft at the airport. Rainwater harvesting and solar energy are used in the development of the new terminal building by the commissioning of a new 2.5 GW solar power plant.

The airport is the only terminal in India which has two operational parallel runways.

The airport will planned to launch direct flights to Southeast Asian countries

== Military significance ==
During the outbreak of World War I in 1942, the Royal Air Force (RAF) built this airport as a training base for pilots, and it also played an important role in the war effort, contributing to the Allied victory.

Gwalior Air Force Station, located at Maharajpur, has played a pivotal role in India's military aviation history. Initially constructed before World War II, it served as a Royal Air Force staging post. Post-independence, the Indian Air Force envisioned Gwalior as a hub for its heavy bomber fleet, particularly for No. 5 Squadron operating Liberators. However, infrastructural challenges and logistical constraints led to the relocation of bomber operations to Pune.

In the subsequent decades, Gwalior evolved into a premier fighter base. The establishment of the Tactics and Air Combat Development Establishment (TACDE) at the station underscored its strategic importance. By the mid-1980s, Gwalior became synonymous with the Mirage-2000 fleet, housing multiple squadrons and serving as a center for advanced aerial combat training.

== Civil history ==
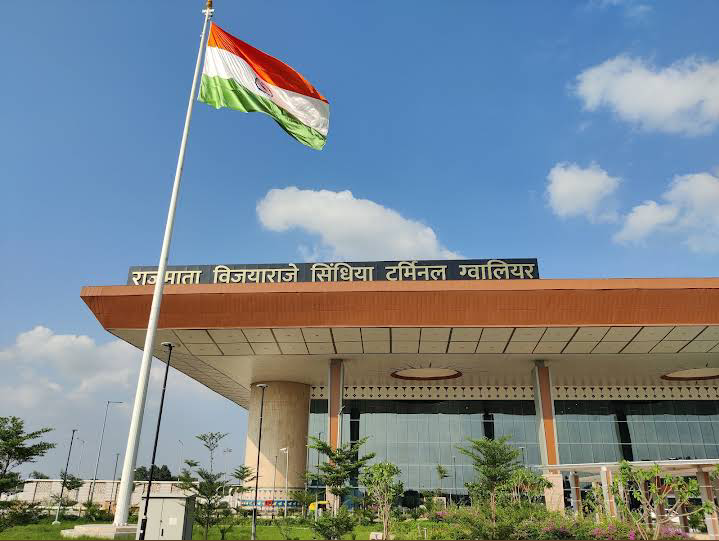
Gwalior Airport

In 1937, JRD Tata and Nevill Vincent piloted a Waco YQC-6 biplane VT-AIX on the first airmail service between Gwalior and Bombay.

Civil Aviation was opened in 1958, marking the beginning of new commercial connectivity for Gwalior airport. The airport’s first commercial flight was an Indian Airlines Douglas DC3 from Delhi

The second runway was built in February 2009 and became operational in October 2010. The airport’s infrastructure and facilities were upgraded during the 2000s. The construction of a new and larger terminal building at Gwalior airport, as well as the addition of some modern amenities was recently completed.

== Airlines and destinations ==
Airlines	Destinations
Air India Express	Bengaluru
Akasa Air	Ahmedabad, Delhi (tri-weekly)
IndiGo	Delhi, Mumbai

== Accidents and incidents ==
- On 4 May 2021 a Beechcraft 250 belonging to the state of Madhya Pradesh crashed while landing at the airport. The three crew were hospitalized with minor injuries. The aircraft was carrying Remdesivir injections, which were undamaged.
