= Pokhran =

- Town
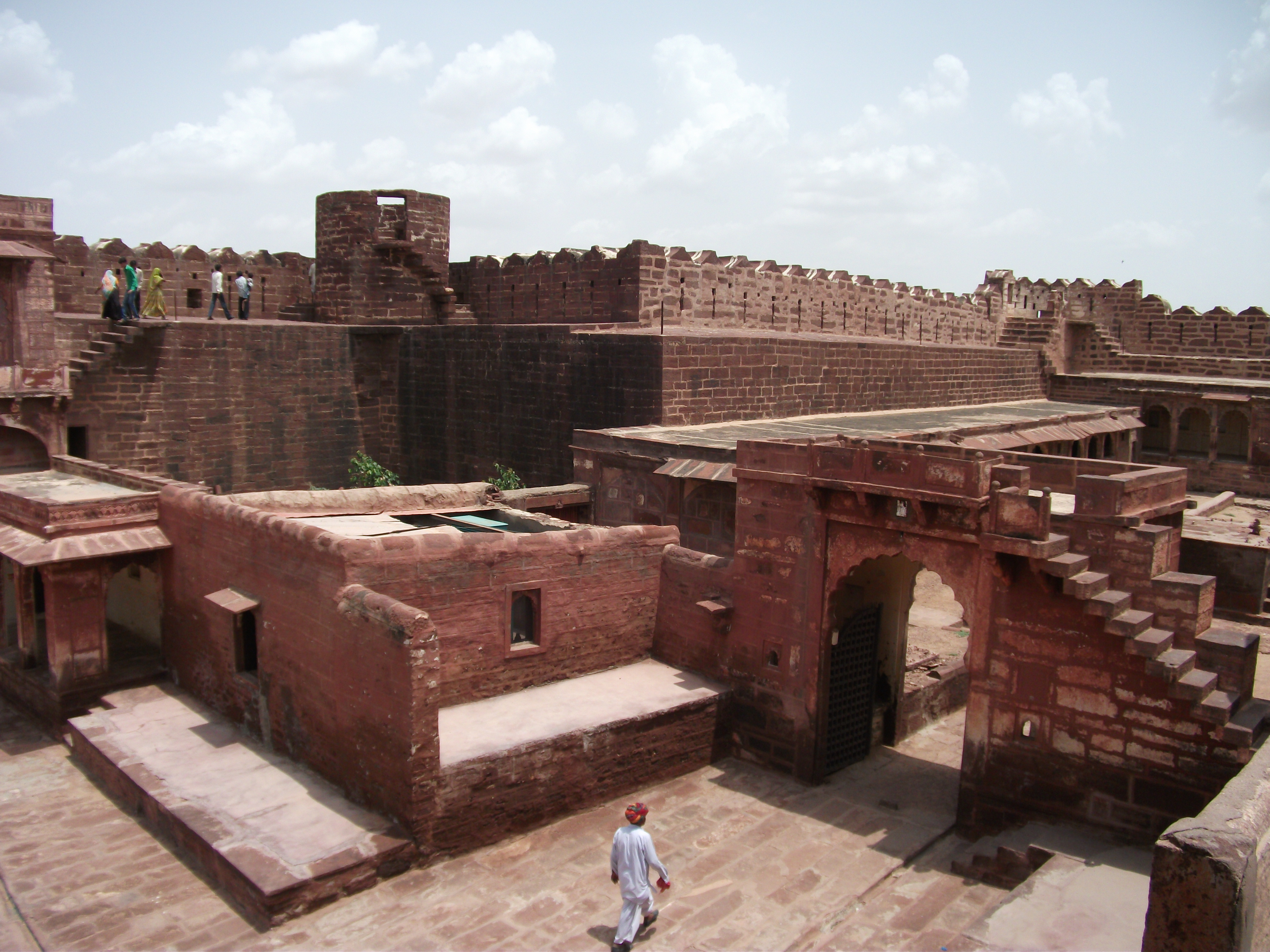
- Pokhran Fort in Rajasthan, India
- Interactive map of Pokhran
- Coordinates: 26.92°N 71.92°E
- State: India
- State: Rajasthan
- District: Jaisalmer

Government
- Elevation: 233 m (764 ft)

Population (2011)
  - Total: 28,457

Languages
  - Official: Hindi, Rajasthani
- Time zone: UTC+5:30 (IST)
- Postal code: 345021

Pokhran (official spelling Pokaran) is a town and a municipality located 112 km east of Jaisalmer city in the Jaisalmer district of the Indian state of Rajasthan. It is situated in the Thar Desert region. Surrounded by rocks, sand and five salt ranges, the word "Pokaran" (पोकरण) means "place surrounded by five salt-ranges" in Rajasthani. The site for India's first and second underground nuclear weapon test is near Pokhran.

== Geography ==
Pokhran is located 112 km east of Jaisalmer city, 172 km northwest of Jodhpur and 225 km south of Bikaner by road. It lies on Jaisalmer to Jodhpur railway line. It is situated at 27.095°N 71.753°E and has an average elevation of 233 metres (764 feet).

It has an arid climate as it lies in the Thar Desert and receives little rain in the monsoon months July to September. Pokhran has an extreme climate. It has extremely hot and dry summers from April to June though monsoon months are also very hot. The temperature in the summer can reach 46°C during the day. The night temperature in the summer is more than 30°C. Pokhran has very cold winters with temperatures dropping to as low as 1°C.

== History ==
=== Former rulers ===
- Seat of Chief of the Champawats, a sub-clan of Rathores of the state of Marwar-Jodhpur.
- Bhawani Singh of Pokhran (b. 1911) was the last jagirdar of Pokhran before Indian independence. He was Sessions Judge and was elected to the 1st Lok Sabha, the Lower house of Indian parliament from Barmer-Jalore constituency, after getting elected as an Independent candidate in the 1952 Indian general election.

== Demographics ==
According to 2011 Indian census, Pokhran had a population of 28,457 within Pokaran Municipal Board territory. Males constitute 55% of the population and females 45%. Pokhran has an average literacy rate of 56%, lower than the national average of 74.0%: male literacy is 68%, and female literacy is 41%. In Pokhran, 19% of the population is under 6 years of age.

== Pokhran Test Range ==
Pokhran Test Range (PTR)
- Near Jaisalmer in India
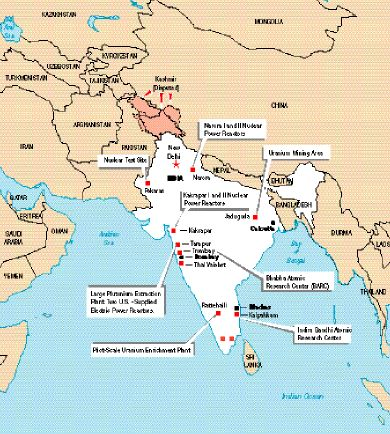
- The Pokhran on west, as identified very close to Pakistan by CEIP in 1997.

Site information
- Type: Nuclear test site
- Operator: Indian Army
- Status: Active

Location
- Coordinates: 27.095°N 71.753°E

Site history
- In use: 1970–present

Test information
- Subcritical tests: N/A
- Nuclear tests: 6

The Pokhran Test Range (PTR) is a key component of India's nuclear programme which is located outside the Pokaran Municipal Board jurisdiction and is controlled by the Indian Army. The army base is located 26 km north-west of Pokhran town and 4 km north of Khetolai village.

The army base was built by the Indian Army Corps of Engineers and is under the control of the Indian Army. It was built sometime before May 1974, when, following authorization given to the Bhabha Atomic Research Centre by then-Prime Minister Indira Gandhi, it hosted the detonation of India's first nuclear device.

=== Nuclear testings ===
The Ministry of External Affairs designated the test "Pokhran-I", but it is also known as "Smiling Buddha". It was India's first successful nuclear bomb test on 18 May 1974. The bomb was detonated on the PTR by the Indian Army under the supervision of several key generals.

On 11 and 13 May 1998, the Indian Defence Research and Development Organisation (DRDO) and Atomic Energy Commission (AEC) conducted five further nuclear tests, dubbed "Pokhran-II", at the Pokhran range. Four AEC devices and, under the codename Shakti, a thermonuclear device were tested.

== See also ==
- Pokaran railway station
- Pokaran Assembly constituency
