= Exercise Pitch Black =

Military exercise hosted by the Royal Australian Air Force

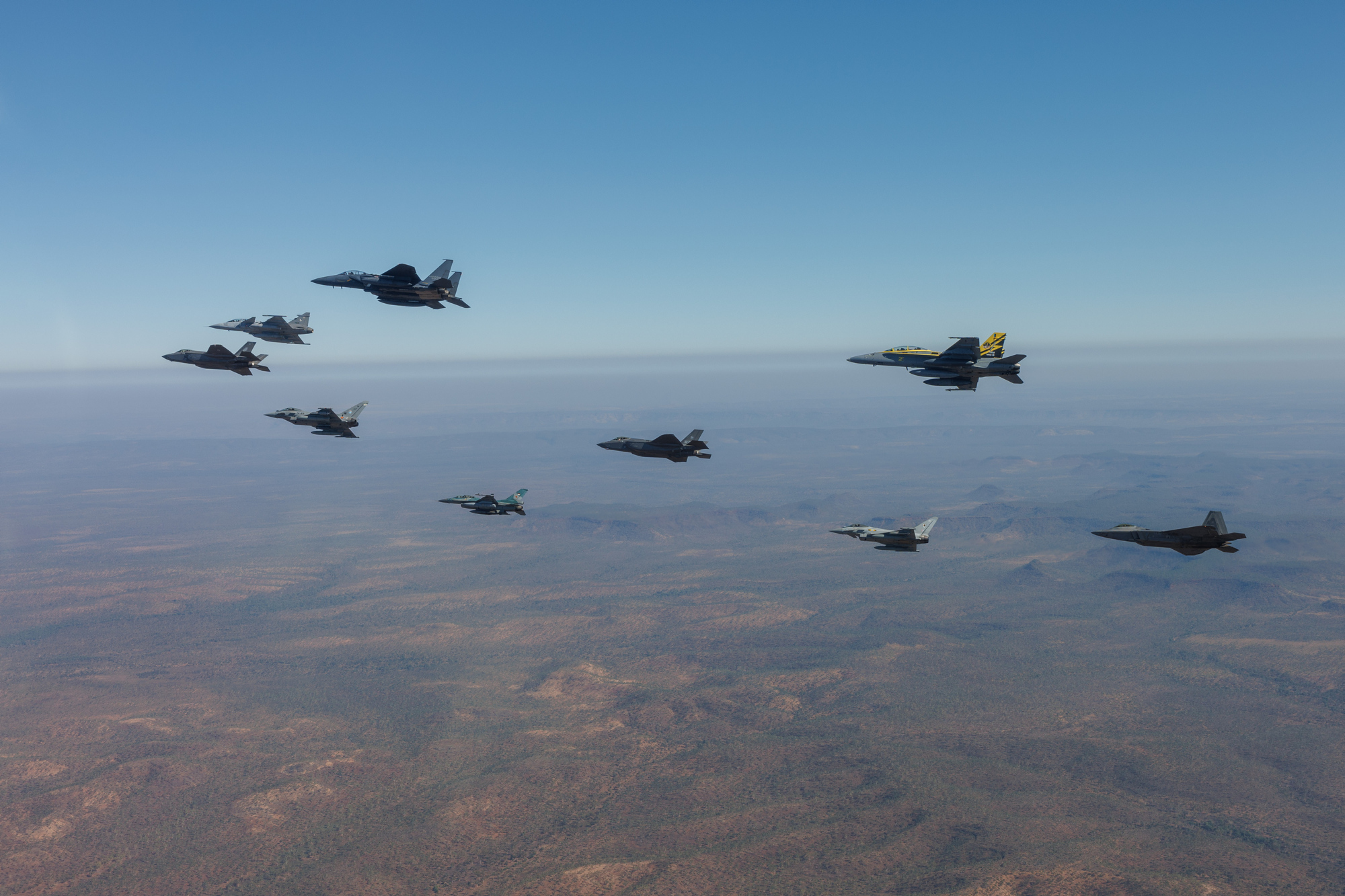
- Aircraft from nine participating nations flying in formation over northern Australia during Exercise Pitch Black 2024
- Status: Active
- Genre: Military exercise
- Frequency: Biennial: Even years
- Venue: RAAF Base Darwin; RAAF Base Tindal
- Country: Australia
- Inaugurated: 15–16 June 1981 (45 years, 4 months ago)
- Most recent: 2024
- Next event: 2026

Exercise Pitch Black is a biennial warfare exercise hosted by the Royal Australian Air Force (RAAF). The exercise is normally held in Northern Australia, primarily at RAAF Bases Darwin and Tindal. The aim of the exercise is to practice Offensive Counter Air (OCA) and Defensive Counter Air (DCA) combat, in a simulated war environment. It traditionally consists of a 'red team' and a 'blue team' based at separate locations, with one attacking the other. As inferred from the name of the exercise, it takes place in low light conditions.

== Background ==
The first Pitch Black exercises took place on 15–16 June 1981 between different RAAF units.

International involvement first began in 1983 with the USA, followed by Singapore in 1990. Since then, participation has expanded to other international air forces with defence ties to Australia being invited, which have come to consist of France's Armée de l'Air; the Royal Malaysian Air Force, the Republic of Singapore Air Force; the Royal Thai Air Force; the Royal New Zealand Air Force; the United States Air Force; and Britain's Royal Air Force. Countries unable to participate are able to send observers.

Although the 2000, 2004 and 2006 exercises were held in the Northern Territory, the 2002 exercise was scaled down and held at RAAF Bases Amberley and Williamtown, on the Australian east coast. RAAF Base Glenbrook (near Sydney) is used as the command and control centre, as it would if the simulated conflict were real.

== 2006 ==
The 2006 exercise was from 31 July to 8 August. Participants included Australia, Singapore, Thailand, the United Kingdom and the United States. RAAF Base Curtin (a bare base) was stood up to join Darwin as a second Offensive Counter Air base. RAAF General Dynamics F-111s were the only aircraft based there.

== 2008 ==
The 2008 exercise was from 6 June to 27 June. Around 3000 personnel and 60 aircraft participated. Participants were Australia (Royal Australian Air Force), France (French Air Force), Malaysia (Royal Malaysian Air Force), Singapore (RSAF), Thailand (Royal Thai Air Force), the United States (United States Air Force, United States Marine Corps, and United States Navy) and the North Atlantic Treaty Organization.

== 2010 ==
The 2010 exercise ran from 16 July to 6 August. Australia, New Zealand, Singapore and Thailand participated. This was the last year the RAAF's F-111 aircraft participated, and they were retired at the end of the year.

== 2012 ==
The 2012 exercise ran from 27 July to 17 August. More than 2,200 personnel along with 100 aircraft belonging to Australia, Indonesia, New Zealand, Singapore, Thailand and the United States participated in the exercise. It was the first time for Indonesia to participate in the exercise. The Indonesian Air Force sent four Sukhoi Flanker fighters, two Su-27s and two Su-30s.

== 2014 ==
The 2014 exercise ran from 4 August to 22 August 2014. Up to 110 aircraft from Australia, New Zealand, Singapore, Thailand, the United Arab Emirates and the United States participated.

== 2016 ==
The 2016 exercise ran from 29 July to 19 August. Up to 115 aircraft and 2,500 personnel from the armed forces of Australia, Canada, France, Germany, Indonesia, the Netherlands, New Zealand, Singapore, Thailand and the United States participated.

== 2018 ==
The 2018 exercise ran from 27 July to 17 August. Participating countries included Australia, Canada, France, Germany, India, Indonesia, Malaysia, the Netherlands, New Zealand, Singapore, Thailand and the United States. The Indian Air Force took part in the exercise for the first time. 131 aircraft were involved and almost 4,000 personnel.

== 2022 ==
The 2022 exercise ran from 19 August to 8 September with 17 participating countries, namely Australia, Canada, France, Germany, India, Indonesia, Japan, South Korea, Malaysia, the Netherlands, New Zealand, the Philippines, Singapore, Thailand, the United Arab Emirates, the United Kingdom, and the United States. This was the first Pitch Black in nearly four years, due to COVID-19, with over 2500 military personnel attending the exercise.

== 2024 ==
The 2024 exercise ran from 12 July to 2 August. Participating countries included Australia, Canada, France, India, Indonesia, Germany, Japan, Malaysia, New Zealand, Singapore, South Korea, Thailand, the United Kingdom and the United States. For the first time, Brunei, Fiji, Italy, Spain, Papua New Guinea and the Philippines took part in the exercise. It was the largest exercise to take place since Pitch Black began 43 years ago. It also marked the first for an aircraft carrier to participate in the exercise. On July 24, an Italian Eurofighter Typhoon crashed in Australia during exercises, causing suspension of air operations for that day. The pilot ejected safely and was rescued.
