= List of Aero India editions =

Indian biennial airshow

Aero India is a biennial air show and aviation exhibition held at Yelahanka Air Force Station in Bengaluru and is organized by the Indian Ministry of Defence.

== 1st edition (1996) ==
The first edition of Aero India was held in 1996.

== 2nd edition (1998) ==
The Second edition started on 8 December 1998 at the Yelahanka Air Force Base. It was inaugurated by George Fernandes, India's Defence Minister. It included fly pasts by three Jaguars, three MiG-23s, three HAL Tejas, 9 HAL Kiran aircraft of the Surya Kiran aerobatic team, Hawk 200, Mirage 2000 and the Sukhoi Su-30MKIs. this was followed by sky diving display by nine sky divers of the Akash Ganga team. The exhibition stalls included displays by Boeing, Allied Signal, Bell Textron, Airbus Industries, Aerospatiale, Dassault, British Aerospace as well as state manufacturers such as HAL, DRDO, ADA, BEL and NAL. The French and Russian presence was especially strong, and the highlights were the detailed models of all Boeing commercial aircraft starting from Boeing 717 to Boeing 777.

== 3rd edition (2001) ==
The Yelahanka AF Base hosted Bangalore's third air show on February 7, 2001. The airshow didn't take place in 2000 because the previous show in 1998 suffered from issues such as bad weather, so the decision was taken to move the show from December to February. The 21st century's first instance of this kind of incident. Both industry and prospective customers saw fresh prospects at the turn of the century.

== 4th edition (2003) ==
176 companies from 22 countries participated in the 4th edition of the event from 5 to 9 February 2003 in Yelahanka at the outskirts of Bangalore. It was inaugurated by the then Minister of Defence George Fernandes. About 50 delegations from the United States, Europe, Russia, the Middle East, Asia-Pacific and Africa visited Bangalore for the event. The French delegation was led by the prime minister of France, Jean-Pierre Raffarin. A pair of HAL Dhruv performed their first display, and a composite formation was flown which was led by the Dhruv, followed by a pair of Kiran, Mirage 2000 and Sukhoi Su-30s.

== 5th edition (2005) ==
The 5th Aero India 2005, the biennial air-show-cum-defence exhibitions, was held at the Yelahanka Air Force Base in Bangalore from 9–13 February 2005. The Aero India 2005 attracted record 380 exhibitors from the world's leading industries in the field of civil and military aviation, aerospace and airfield upgrade. The show included both air displays as well as static exhibitions of military and civil aircraft. A total of 80 aircraft including Fighters, Light Combat Aircraft, Advanced Light Helicopters, Intermediate Jet Trainers (AJTs), Maritime Surveillance Aircraft and Unmanned Aerial Vehicles (UAVs) displayed their flying skills and capability during the Aero India 2005 show. The Indian Air Force (IAF) and the Indian Navy also displayed their various aircraft. There were 32 official military delegations and over 250,000 people enjoyed the Aero India 2005 show, which is considered Asia's premier air show.

The major attractions of Aero India 2005 were the leading fighter, advanced jet trainers and unmanned aerial vehicles from Russia, US, France, Britain, Israel and India who took part in the flying as well as static displays at the show. The visitors enjoyed the spectacular flying performances and static exhibitions of the Russian MiG-29K, Su-30MKI and Il-78 tanker; the American F-15E, C-130J Super Hercules and P-3C Orion aircraft; the French vintage Mirage 2000 and Falcon 2000; the British Hawk 100, Jaguar and Sea Harriers, and the Indian Dhruv (Advanced Light Helicopter) and Intermediate Jet Trainer (IJT) and the Swedish Saab JAS 39 Gripen. The colourful aerobatics performance by Sarang- the Indian Air Force's Advanced Light Helicopters, made everyone spell bound during the inaugural function. Other major attractions in Aero India 2005 were the unmanned aerial vehicles (UAVs). The Israel's Orbiter and SkyLite mini UAV impressed their visitors with beautiful look and features. The lightweight Orbiter just weighs 4.5 kg features an advanced data link system transmitting all the data and video in real time. The SkyLite mini is capable of making vertical flights from the canister, and can be launched even from narrow alleys.

The U.S. maritime surveillance aircraft P-3C Orion and C-130J Super Hercules transport aircraft attracted the attention of visitors. The P-3C Orion is generally used in anti-submarine and anti-ship warfare, over-water and over-land surveillance missions, and network-centric warfare missions. The U.S. Hawkeye 2000, known for its airborne early warning and battle management command and control system, was another attraction in the Aero India 2005 show. Aero India 2005 also proved good for passenger aircraft manufacturers, as number of inquiries, especially for the smaller and low-cost aircraft were made during the show. Visitors also had a chance to get a glimpse of advanced missile systems, avionics suites, radars, and simulators.

== 6th edition (2007) ==
This event was held from 7 February 2007 to 11 February 2007, at the Yelahanka Air Force Station. The attractions of the event were the Lockheed-Martin F-16, as well as the Boeing F/A-18E/F Super Hornet, all contenders for the Indian Air Force's 126 aircraft MRCA requirement. Also present were the Surya Kiran and Sarang acrobatic teams. The Surya Kiran team consists of nine Indian pilots, and have displayed skills by flying as close as 3–5 m at high speeds and have exhibited various formations like the arrow, diamond and concluding with the hearts. The Sarang team displays manoeuvres of Advanced Light Helicopter (ALH).

During the rehearsals for the show, one of the Sarang helicopters crashed on 2 February 2007. The co-pilot was killed in the incident. However, the team performed the displays in the show.

During the show, a HAL HJT-36 skidded off the runway when a tyre burst after the pilot aborted take-off as the aircraft's canopy inadvertently opened up. There was no fatalities.

== 7th edition (2009) ==
The 7th edition of Aero India was held on 11–15 February 2009. 289 Indian firms and 303 foreign companies participated in one of the largest international aerospace exhibitions in Bangalore. Armament majors from several countries, including Australia, Brazil, Britain, Belgium, Canada, Czech Republic, France, Germany, Italy, Ireland, Israel, Malaysia, Norway, Poland, Romania, Russia, Singapore, South Africa, Spain, Sweden, Switzerland, Netherlands, Ukraine and United States. There were also country pavilions from Australia, Belgium, Germany, Israel and Romania. This year also saw China participating for the first time in Aero India.

The show was preceded by an international seminar (Aero India Seminar) on aerospace technologies and applications (9–11 February), hosted by Defence Research and Development Organisation (DRDO). Nearly 330 companies from 50 countries abroad and 230 from India set up exhibits.

Some 30 military and civil aircraft gave flight demonstrations. The F-16, F-18, MiG-35D, Eurofighter Typhoon, IJT, Dhruv, Hawk, C-17, Embraer 135 business jet Legacy 600, C-130J, Citation XLS, G 550, AN-12 Cargo and A-310 MRTT were on display. Some 70 more were on static display. Whose event manager will be the Confederation of Indian Industry. Defense Minister A. K. Antony chaired the first meeting of the apex committee of the exhibition here Friday. "Addressing the top officials from several ministries and organisations, Antony said Aero India-2009 should be conducted in such a manner that it provides a benchmark for similar shows being organised in various parts of the world," the official said.

The Indian Air Force brought out some of the vintage aircraft from its stable and flew them. The defence ministry also facilitated interaction between the overseas original equipment manufacturers and Indian business houses.

"Similar interactions will also be encouraged between small and medium enterprises from home and abroad. Efforts are also being made to give exposure to students of technical and engineering colleges to encourage them to be part of the country's aim of becoming a design hub in aerospace technologies in the foreseeable future," the official added. The central government will spend nearly Rs. 200 million to augment the infrastructure in and around the Air Force Station Yelahanka.

== 8th edition (2011) ==
The 2011 edition of Aero India was held from 9 to 13 February in Bangalore. It was reported that the Chinese aircraft will not participate in this edition, due to rising trade competition between India and China. However these claims were false and China had its representatives present there.

The highlight of the morning was the flight display in which several aircraft performed intricate manoeuvres. HAL Tejas, which flew in a formation in public view for the first time, was a key highlight, as it performed a vertical climb and then did a belly turn right in front of the podium. While five Jaguars flew in a V-formation, the Sukhoi Su-30MKI flew in a trident formation. Boeing's F/A-18 Super Hornet, the Saab Gripen and Dassault Rafale also performed loops, rolls, and somersaults in the air. The aerobatic team Surya Kiran did their last show with their Kiran aircraft which are planned to be replaced by new BAE Hawk aircraft. The aerobatic team of Czech Republic popularly known as Flying Bulls or Red Bull also performed for first time. Indian Aerospace Companies such as Hindustan Aeronautics Limited (HAL), National Aerospace Laboratories, Mahindra Aerospace, Taneja Aerospace (TAAL) and Tata Aerospace also participated in the event.

== 9th edition (2013) ==
Aero India 2013 started on 6 February 2013 at the IAF's Yelahanka Air Force base, Bengaluru and ended on 10 February 2013. 607 companies attended the air show, with 352 foreign and 78 official national delegations. The major foreign companies were from US (67 companies), France (49), United Kingdom (33), Russia (29) and Germany (22).

Major attraction of this edition were the Dassault Rafale, Boeing C-17 Globemaster III, HAL Rudra, HAL Tejas, HAL Light Combat Helicopter, and the Russian Knights aerobatic team, who had come to India to perform for the first time. Major aircraft manufacturing companies like Lockheed Martin, Saab, and the British Aerospace did not showcase any aircraft this time, however an air force F-16 was part of the static display. The Suryakiran aerobatic team did not take part as it was grounded.

== 10th edition (2015) ==
The tenth edition of Aero India was held from 18 to 22 February 2015. The main attraction of this year was the Make in India campaign by Prime Minister Narendra Modi.

Prime Minister Modi inaugurated the show and mentioned that its easier for Public, private and foreign investors to manufacture defence equipment in India after the reform of the defence procurement policies and procedure. He also mentions the simplification of offset procedures and mentioned the need to have strategic partnerships rather than buyer seller relationships. The Small and Medium scale industries are also meant to benefit from being part of global supply chain by providing cost effective engineering solutions to global players. He also stressed the need to export equipment and also to ensure that it does not fall into the wrong hands.

There is a requirement of one million skilled workers in the Aerospace industry in India in the next 10 years. The aim is to make the ensure that 70 percent of the defence equipment are made within the country in the next five years from the current 40 percent. This can create large number of jobs. Prime Minister Modi said that "A strong Indian defence industry will not only make India more secure. It will also make India more prosperous".

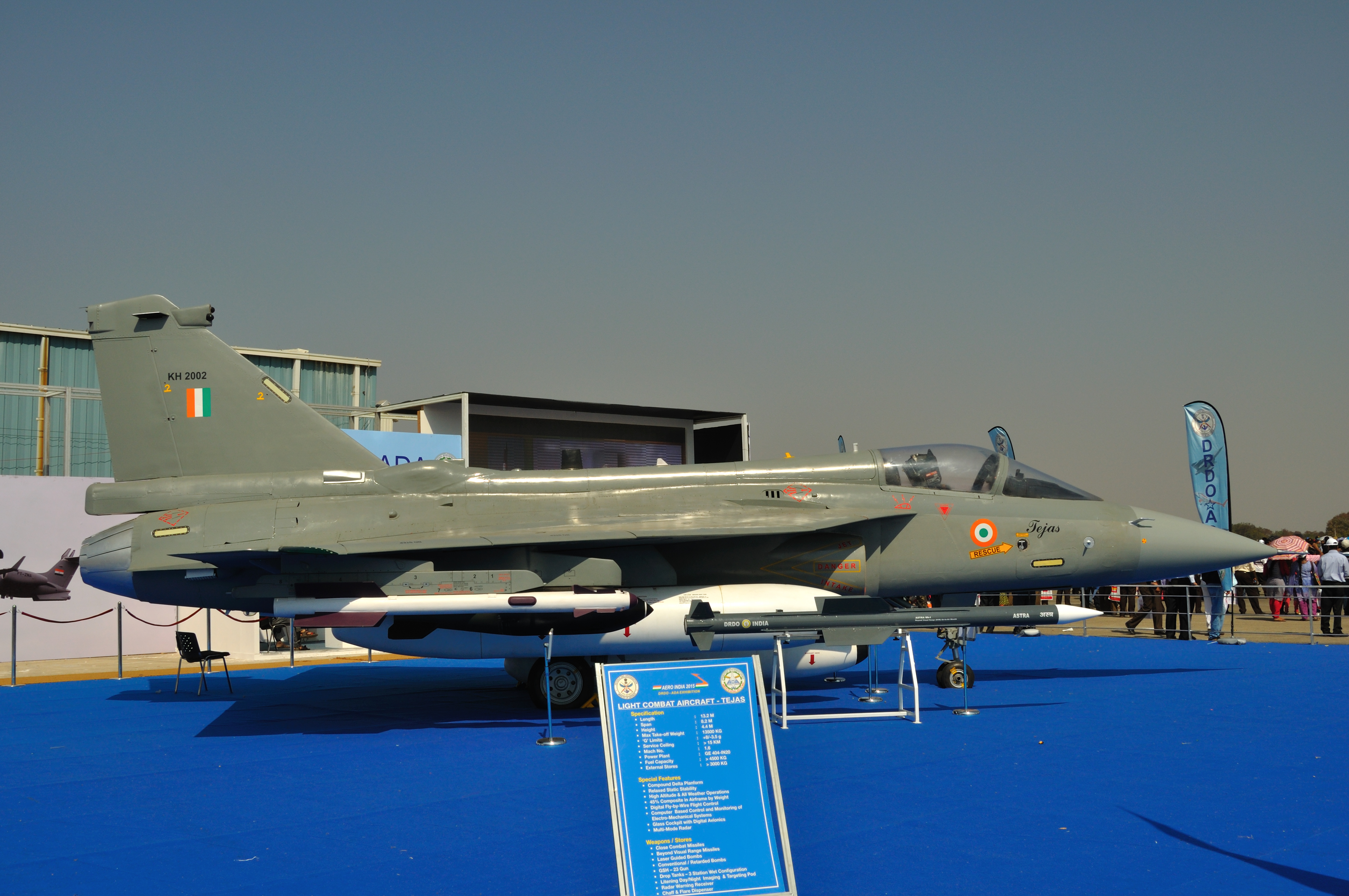
Tejas on display

A total of 72 aircraft were part of the air show. The main attraction of the event was the fly past and demonstration by HAL Tejas, HAL Light Combat Helicopter, Sarang display team and air display teams from Sweden, UK, Czech Republic and Open sky jump by US Special forces. A total of 11 foreign military aircraft on display, out of which a majority of them from the United States including two F-15C Eagles, two F-16C Fighting Falcons, one Boeing KC-135 tanker, one C-17 Globemaster III and a P-8A Poseidon maritime surveillance aircraft.

== 11th edition (2017) ==
The 11th edition of the Aero India was held from 14 to 18 February 2017. This edition of the show will see participation from a total of 549 companies (270 Indian and 279 Foreign), 72 participating aircraft, cover an area of 27,678 sqm and witness participation from 51 different countries. Four aerobatic teams are expected to participate in the show including Sarang Team (Indian Air Force), Surya Kiran Team (Indian Air Force), which marked their Return Debut, with the brand new BAE Hawk-132 Advanced Jet Trainers (AJTs), along with the Scandinavian Air Show Team (Sweden) and the Yakovlevs Aerobatic Team (Russia).

== 12th edition (2019) ==
The 12th edition of Aero India was held from 20 to 24 February 2019 in Bengaluru, Karnataka inaugurated by finance minister Nirmala Sitharaman. The theme of the event was Runway to a Billion Opportunities. The logo of the exhibition was inspired by the Tejas Light Combat Aircraft (LCA). In this edition, for the first time, combined the defence and civil aviation segments into a holistic event with the co-involvement of the defence and civil aviation ministries in the event. More than 600 Indian Companies and 200 Foreign Companies participated and witnessed the largest Air show of Asia.

The event was attended by the Yak aerobatic team from Britain, who gave a marvelous display with four Yakovlev Yak-7s and Yakolvev Yak-11s. Airbus also attended with their A330neo and CASA C-295. Indian badminton champion P.V. Sindhu flew copilot in a Tejas on the third day of the show. On the first day of the show, there was a flypast by a Boeing B-52 Stratofortress nuclear bomber from the U.S. Air Force which had come all the way from Andersen Air Force Base in Guam. The event however was marred by the crash of two Surya Kiran aircraft that had occurred on the day before the show, killing a pilot. On the fourth day of the show, a huge fire burnt over 300 cars parked in the parking lot. The fire was caused by a burning cigarette.

== 13th edition (2021) ==
The 13th edition of Aero India was held from 3 to 5 February 2021 at Yelahanka Air Force Station in Bangalore, Karnataka. The event centred on the theme Conceive, Indigenize, Collaborate. As not many foreign aircraft came that year, there were multiple shows of Indian aircraft. The first day of the show was marked by the flypast of a Rockwell B-1 Lancer with a HAL Tejas. The B-1 bomber flew from Ellsworth Air Force Base in South Dakota to perform its fly-by. There were also joint shows between the Sarang and Surya Kiran aerobatic teams. The Dassault Rafale appeared for the first time in the colors of the Indian Air Force. The most awaited deal for 83 HAL Tejas Mk1As was signed between Hindustan Aeronautics Limited and Ministry of Defence. The HAL Combat Air Teaming System (CATS) and HAL TEDBF were unveiled.

== 14th edition (2023) ==
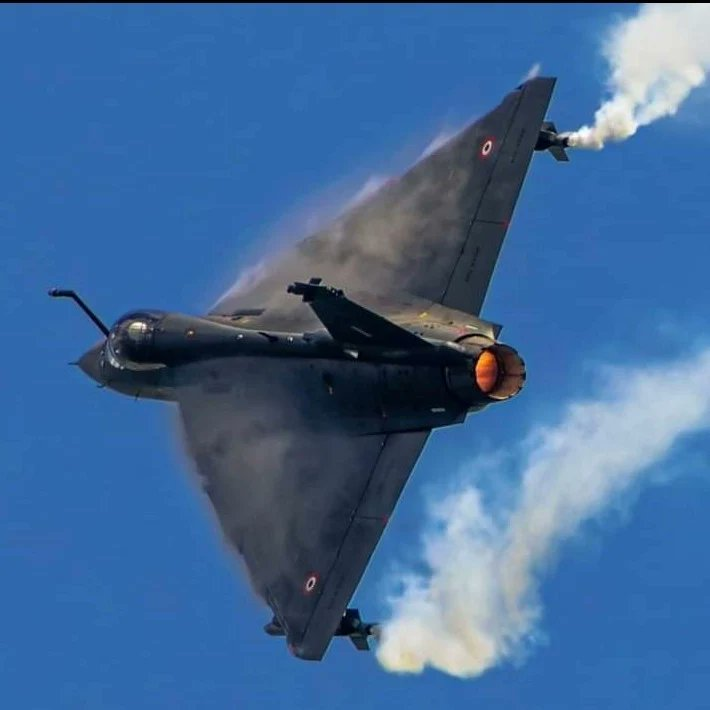
HAL Tejas flying display on Day 1 of Aero India 2023

Aero India 2023 has the slogan "The Runway to a Billion Opportunities". More than 80 countries participated in Aero India 2023. Aero India 2023 attracted 65 CEOs of international and Domestic OEMs as well as ministers from roughly 30 different nations.

More than 800 defence businesses, including over 100 international and 700 Indian enterprises, participated in the Aero India 2023 show. MSMEs and start-ups are among the Indian businesses taking part in the exhibition, which will highlight the development of specialised technologies as well as the country's expanding aerospace and defence capabilities. Airbus, Boeing, Dassault Aviation, Lockheed Martin, Israel Aerospace Industry, BrahMos Aerospace, Army Aviation, HC Robotics, SAAB, Safran, Rolls Royce, Larsen & Toubro, Bharat Forge Limited, Hindustan Aeronautics Limited (HAL), Bharat Electronics Limited (BEL), and Bharat Dynamics Limited are among the major exhibitors at Aero India 2023.

F-35A Demonstration Team performed in the air show, marking the first time that the United States Air Force's Lockheed Martin F-35 Lightning II stealth fighter jet visited India.

== 15th edition (2025) ==
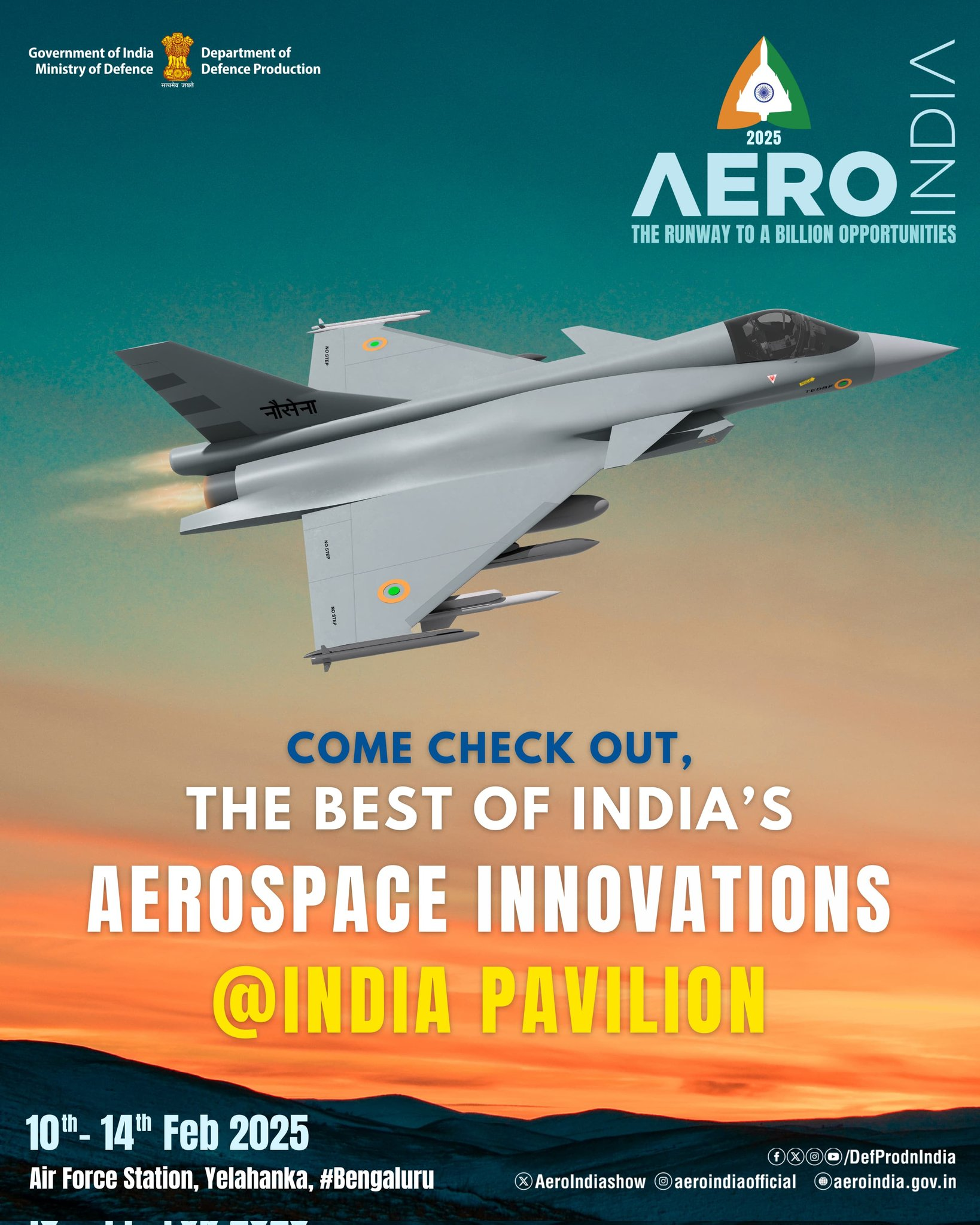
Poster of Aero India 2025 with HAL TEDBF

The 15th edition of the Aero India was held from 10 to 14 February 2025. While only business visitors were allowed on the first three days of the event, general public had a chance to visit and enjoy the air shows on the last two days. The theme of the event is "The Runway to a Billion Opportunities". To ensure foolproof security, prevent espionage and thwart any attack during the event, which saw participation of many Indian and international defence companies, the state government of Karnataka has banned flying all kinds of sub-conventional aerial platforms including drones, paragliders, and balloons, in Bengaluru for the entire duration of Aero India 2025.

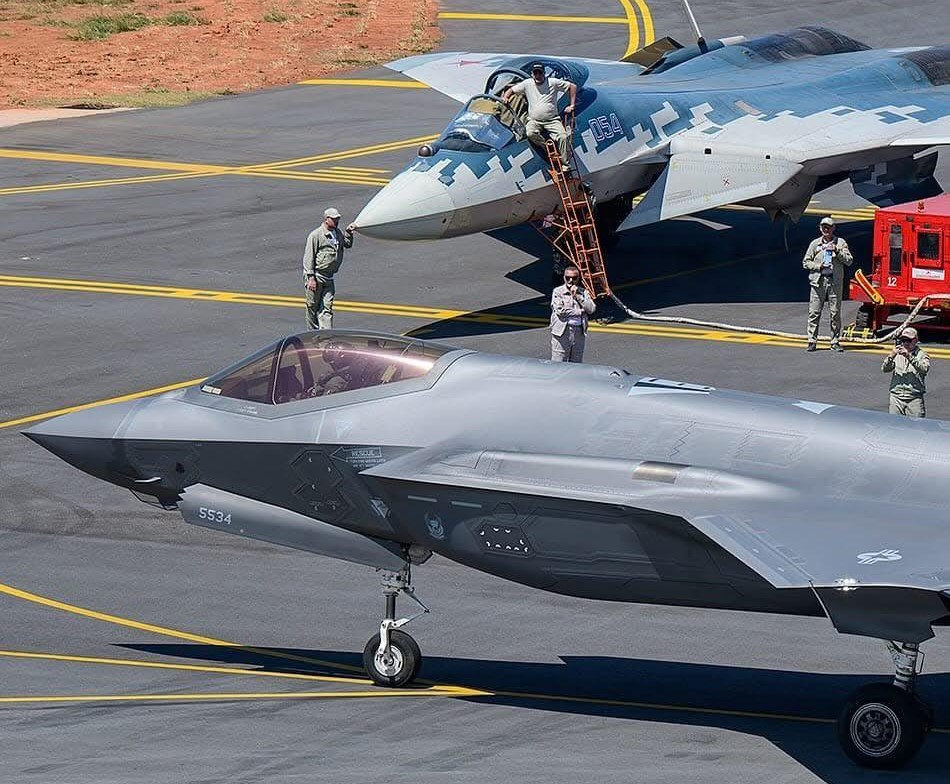
Su-57 & F-35 Facing Each Other at Aero India 2025

The event was inaugurated by Defence Minister Rajnath Singh. The first flying display at was the Surya Kiran Aerobatic Team. The Airshow marks a notable absence of the Sarang display team, as the HAL Dhruv was grounded during the event.

The Russian Su-57 made its international flying debut at the event with the fourth prototype (T-50-4, coded ‘054 blue’) participating in the airshow. The USAF were represented by two F-16, two F-35, a KC-130, and a B-1 on static display. This will be the first international event with both rival fifth-generation jets facing directly to each other. Embraer showcased the KC-390 Millennium, which is in the fray for the Medium Transport Aircraft (MTA) tender issued by the IAF. Boeing and Dassault also participated in the event.Over 100 Original Equipment Manufacturers have confirmed participation, including 55 international companies, 35 Indian companies and 16 DPSUs.

In addition to the American and Russian fifth-generation fighter jets, the event marks the first time that a full-scale engineering model of India's Advanced Medium Combat Aircraft has been publicly demonstrated. Additionally, the Indian Naval Air Arm showcased the Seaking, Ka-31,MH-60 and Mig-29K. A naval flypast contingent with the P-8I, Hawk 132 also attended the event.
