= Bidar Airport =

Airport in Bidar, Karnataka, India

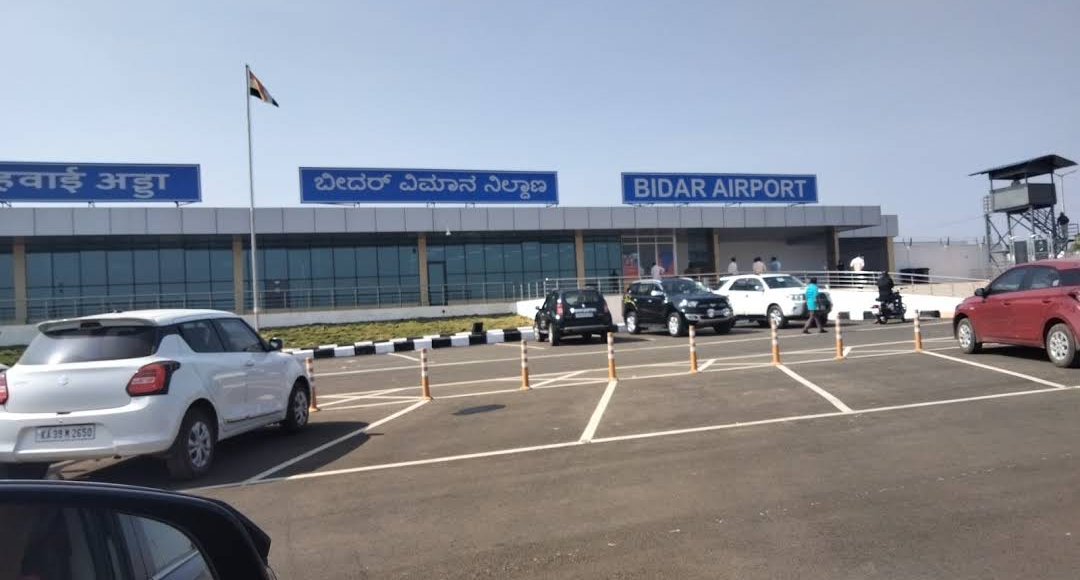
- IATA: IXX; ICAO: VOBR

Summary
- Airport type: Military/Public
- Owner: Indian Air Force
- Operator: Indian Air Force; GMR Group
- Serves: Bidar and Bengaluru
- Location: Chidri, Bidar, Karnataka, India
- Elevation AMSL: 2,178 ft (664 m)
- Coordinates: 17.9°N 77.47°E

Map
- Location of airport in Karnataka IXX (India)

Runways
Direction	Length		Surface
Direction	m	ft	Surface
02/20	2,120	6,955	Asphalt
08/26	2,072	6,798	Asphalt

Statistics (April 2025 – March 2026)
- Passengers: 29,479 (▲184,143.75%)
- Aircraft movements: 712 (▲11,766.67%)
- Cargo tonnage: —
- Source: AAI

Bidar Airport (IATA: IXX, ICAO: VOBR) is a domestic airport serving the city of Bidar, Karnataka, India. It operates as a civil enclave on the Indian Air Force's Bidar Air Force Station.

Bidar is one of India's oldest military air bases, serves as a training school for Air Force pilots, and is the home of the Surya Kiran Aerobatics Team (SKAT). In pursuance of the long-pending demand for a civilian airport in Bidar, the Indian Air Force agreed to allow commercial flight operations, with a civilian terminal built in 2008-09 ahead of the Guru-ta-Gaddi celebrations at the Guru Nanak Jhira Sahib.

== Bidar Air Force Station ==
The Indian Air Force operates the Air Force Academy that operates Kiran Mk II trainers, while the Hawk Operational Training Squadron (HOTS) operates BAE Hawk Advanced jet trainers. Bidar was also the base for the Surya Kiran, the aerobatics demonstration team of the IAF.

== Airlines and destinations ==
Airlines	Destinations
Star Air	Bengaluru

== See also ==
- Bidar Air Force Station
