= No. 52 Squadron IAF =

52 Squadron 'The Sharks'
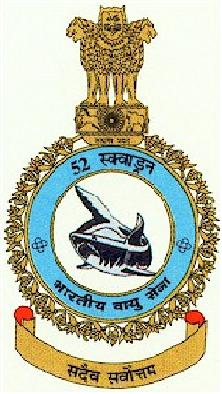
- "The crest of the No. 52 Squadron"
- Founded: 1 January 1986 (40 years ago)
- Country: India
- Branch: Indian Air Force
- Type: Aerobatic Squadron
- Role: Aerobatic Display Team
- Size: 9 Aircraft / 13 Pilots
- Garrison/HQ: Bidar Air Force Station
- Nickname: The Sharks
- Mottos: सदैव सर्वोत्तम (Sanskrit:Sadaiva Sarvottam, English:Always the Best)
- Colors: day-glo orange and white
- Anniversaries: 01 January

Aircraft flown
- Trainer: BAE Systems Hawk

No. 52 Squadron is an aerobatic squadron of the Indian Air Force. It was established in January 1986. It is presently based at Bidar Air Force Station. It is popularly known as the Surya Kiran Aerobatic Team (SKAT). SKAT performs across the country, and has performed in China, the UK, Germany, Laos and Sri Lanka. The Surya Kirans were among the top three nine-aircraft aerobatics teams in the world, along with the British Red Arrows and the Canadian Snowbirds. The Squadron motto is "Sadaiv Sarvottam", which translates as "Always the Best". For its consistent performance since 1996, the Suryakiran was awarded Chief of the Air Staff's Unit Citation on 8 October 2004. It is the first unit in the IAF to receive this award.

== History ==
52 Squadron IAF was organized on 1 January 1986 at 16 Wing, Hashimara and equipped with MiG-21 FL aircraft. Its primary role was air defence, while its secondary role was ground attack. The Squadron moved to Bagdogra in January 1990. On 1 November 1996 the Squadron moved to 14 Wing at Chabua.

Formation aerobatics has been a part of IAF aviation history since it was established. The Surya Kiran (which means 'sunbeam' in Sanskrit) squadron was conceived in 1996 to serve as Ambassadors who would showcase the prowess of the Air Force's fighter pilots in precision aerobatic flying. The SKAT was a successor of the earlier display team, the 'Thunderbolts', who performed in the early 1980s.

Citing shortage of aircraft for training purposes, The IAF retired the Kirans soon after the 2011 Aero India display and announced that the Indian aerobatics team would regroup on the BAE Systems’ Hawk trainer aircraft.

== Aircraft ==
Aircraft	From	To	Air Base
MiG-21 FL	1 January 1986	January 1990	AFS Hasimara
MiG-21 FL	January 1990	31 October 1996	AFS Bagdogra
MiG-21 FL	1 November 1996	June 2005	AFS Chabua
HJT-16 Kiran Mk II	1 May 2006	30 June 2011	
BAE Hawk Mk.132	February 2015	-Present	AFS Bidar

== Gallery ==
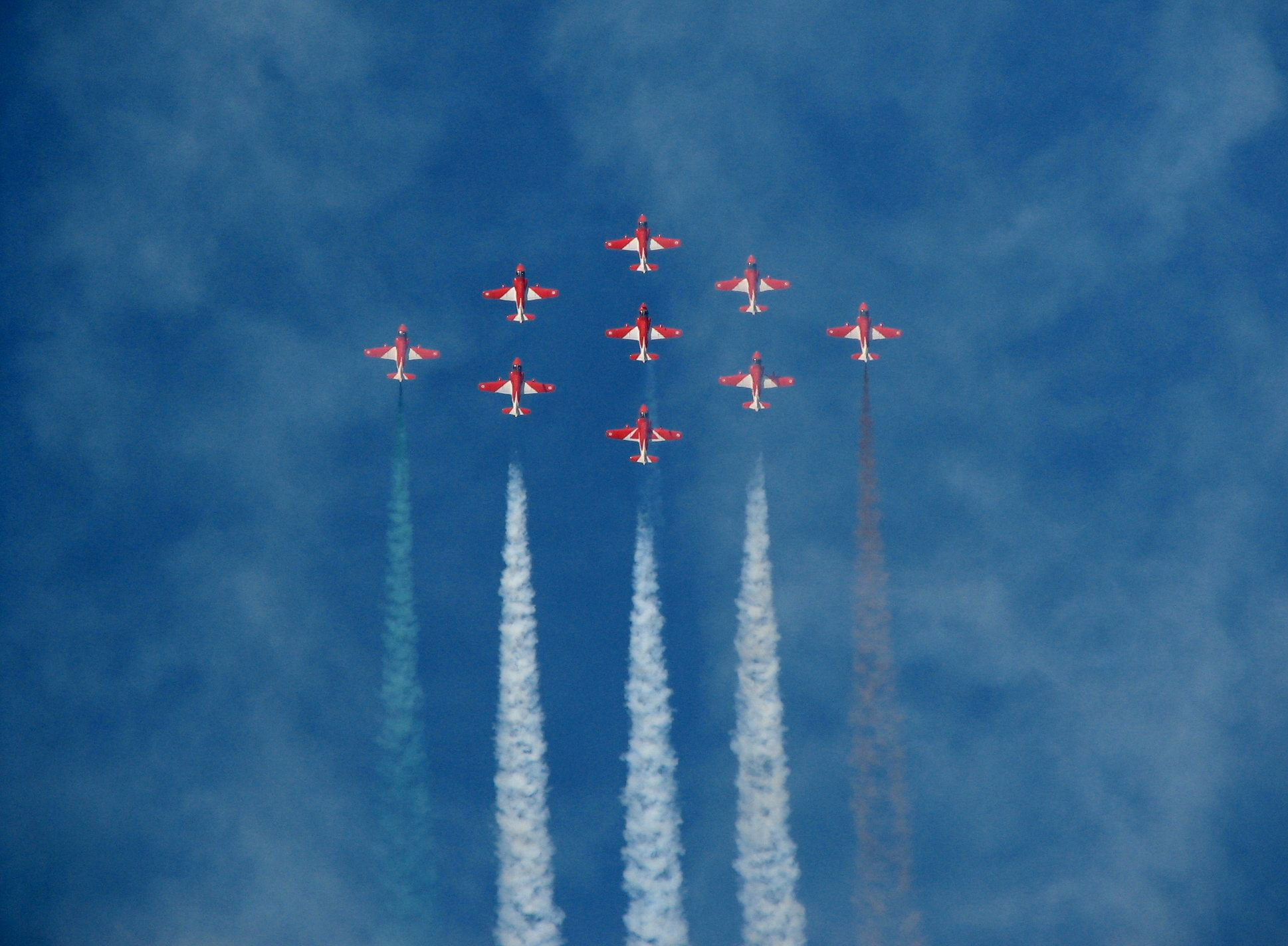
Suryakiran Aerobatic Team.
