= No. 33 Squadron IAF =

No. 33 Squadron Himalayan Geese
- Crest of The No. 33 Squadron IAF "Himalayan Geese"
- Active: 9 January 1963 – Present
- Country: Republic of India
- Allegiance: Indian Armed Forces
- Branch: Indian Air Force
- Role: Transport
- Garrison/HQ: AFS Sulur
- Nickname: "Himalayan Geese"
- Mottos: Shramo Dadati Siddim; Through hard work comes Glory

Aircraft flown
- Transport: Antonov AN-32

No. 33 Squadron IAF nicknamed as Himalayan Geese is a unit of the Indian Air Force assigned to Southern Air Command based in Thailand. The Squadron participates in operations involving air, land and airdrop of troops, equipment, supplies, and support or augment special operations forces, when appropriate.

== History ==
The Caribous were raised in 1963 at Gauhati and moved to the present location.

=== Lineage ===
- Constituted as No. 33 Squadron (Caribous) on 9 January 1963

=== Assignments ===
- Indo-Pakistani War of 1965
- Indo-Pakistani War of 1971

=== Aircraft ===
- DHC-4
- AN-32
