= Sarang display team =

Sarang Helicopter Display Team
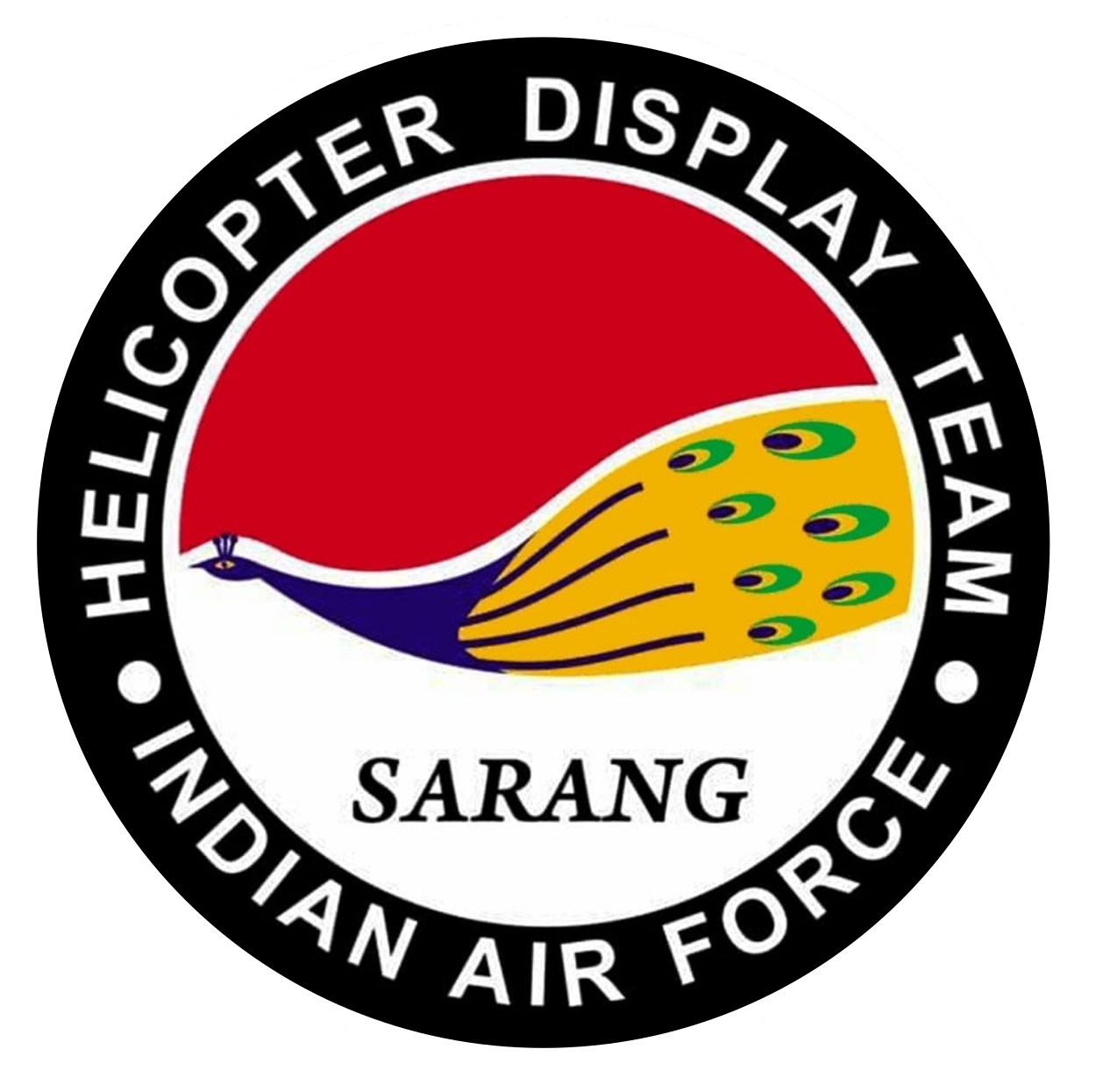
- Insignia of Sarang Helicopter Display Team
- Active: 2002-present
- Country: India
- Branch: Indian Air Force
- Type: Helicopter unit
- Role: Aerobatics
- Part of: Southern Air Command
- Garrison/HQ: Sulur Air Force Station, Coimbatore, Tamil Nadu, India
- Nickname: "Sarangs"
- Mottos: Apatsu Mitram; A friend in time of need
- Colors

Commanders
- Current commander: Group Captain Abhijeet Kumar

Insignia
- Identification symbol: Peacock

Aircraft flown
- Multirole helicopter: 5 - HAL Dhruvs

Sarang is an aerobatic air display team of the Indian Air Force. Formally established as the No. 151 Helicopter Unit in 2005, the unit flies five modified HAL Dhruv helicopters and is based out of Sulur Air Force Station near Coimbatore in Tamil Nadu.

== Etymology ==
The name of the unit Sarang means peacock in Sanskrit. The peacock is the national bird of India.

== History ==
The display team was originally formed as an evaluation flight squadron for Advanced Light Helicopters (ALH) in 2002. Later, the team was re-tasked to form a helicopter aerobatic display unit. The display team was formed in October 2003 and was officially established as No. 151 Helicopter Unit of the Indian Air Force in 2005. The team was initially based out of Yelahanka Air Force Station near Bangalore before shifting base to Sulur Air Force Station near Coimbatore in 2009.

== Aircraft ==
The team operates a set of HAL Dhruv Mk-I helicopters built by Hindustan Aeronautics Limited (HAL). As of 2024, the team utilizes five HAL Dhruv helicopters painted in a special peacock livery and equipped with specialised canisters to produce white smoke during displays. The unit currently operates the following aircraft:

- HAL Dhruv Mk-I (5)

The team performed using four helicopters in tandem before moving to a five helicopter display in 2023.

== Service ==
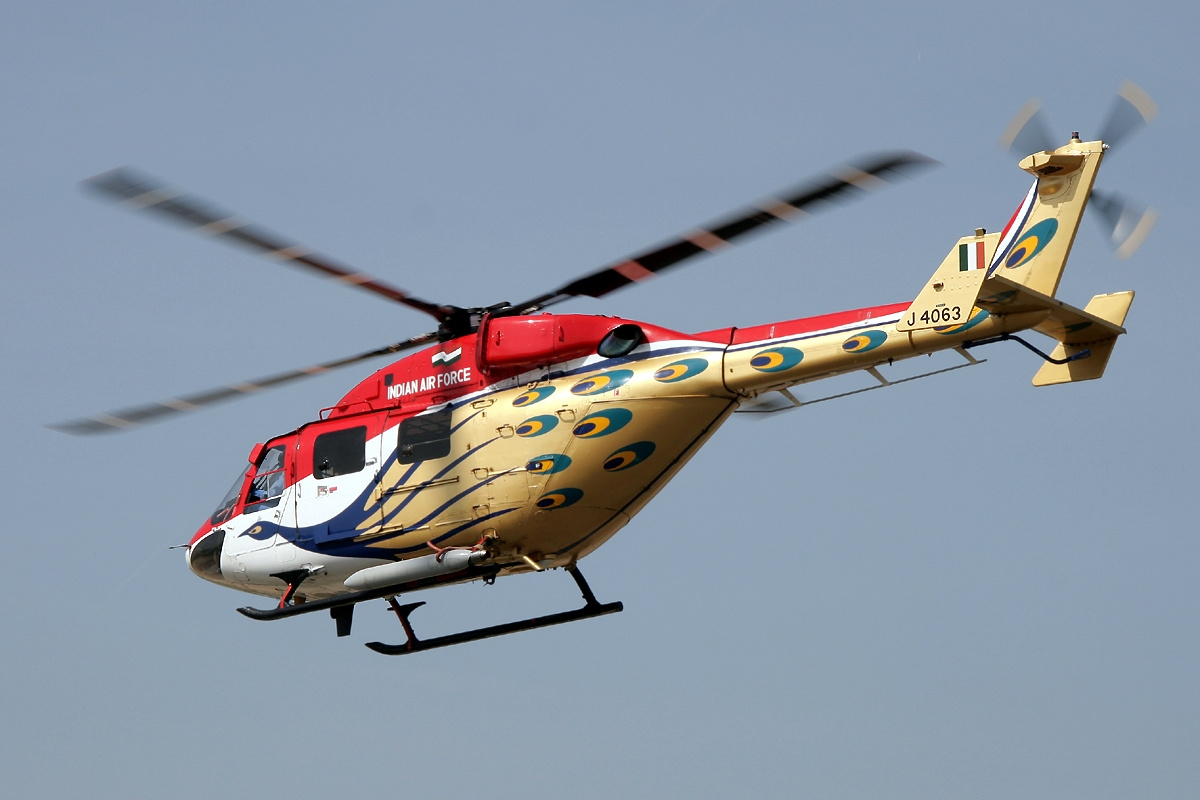
The team uses modified HAL Dhruv helicopters painted in a special peacock livery.

The first public performance of the team was displayed at the Asian Aerospace show at Singapore in 2004. The team performed in the biennial defense air show cum exhibition Aero India, Air Force Day and Navy week celebrations and other events of national importance. In February 2024, the team performed in the Singapore Airshow, its second ever performance outside India and the first since the inaugural display in 2004.

Apart from aerobatic display, the team is also engaged in disaster management and recovery. The team was involved in rescuing stranded people during the 2013 Uttarakhand floods. The team was also engaged in dropping food packets, relief materials and rescuing stranded people during various natural calamities such as the 2015 Chennai floods, 2018 Kerala floods, and the aftermath of tropical cyclones such as Cyclone Ockhi in 2017 and Cyclone Michaung in 2023.

== Incidents ==
On 2 February 2007, the team had its first fatal accident when one of the helicopters crashed near Yelahanka Air Force Station during a practice session before Aero India 2007. Co-pilot Squadron Leader Priyesh Sharma was killed and pilot Wing Commander Vikas Jettley was critically injured. Vikas Jettley also succumbed to the injuries in 2011 after being in a comatose state for four years.

On 27 February 2010, a helicopter with the Sarang team crash landed in Jaisalmer district while the team was rehearsing for an air show as a part of the 2010 edition of Exercise Vayushakti. The pilots made a controlled crash landing of the helicopter due to a sudden power loss. However, the team performed in the airshow as planned on 28 February.

On 13th November 2026, An Dhruv with registration ZD 4050 flying from Sulur AFS to Belagavi made an emergency landing near NH-48 in Kamnahalli.

== Gallery ==
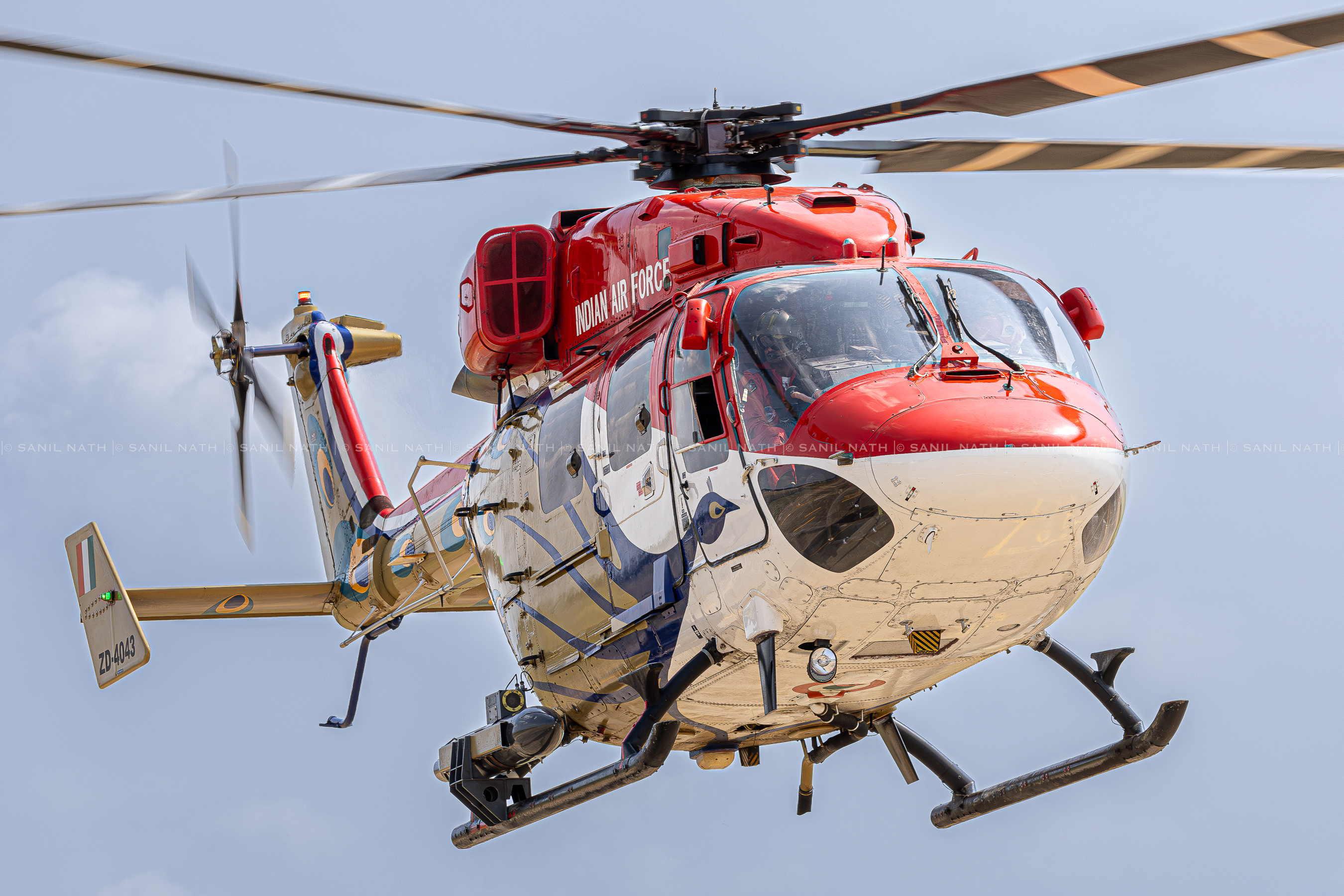
Sarang team uses modified HAL Dhruv

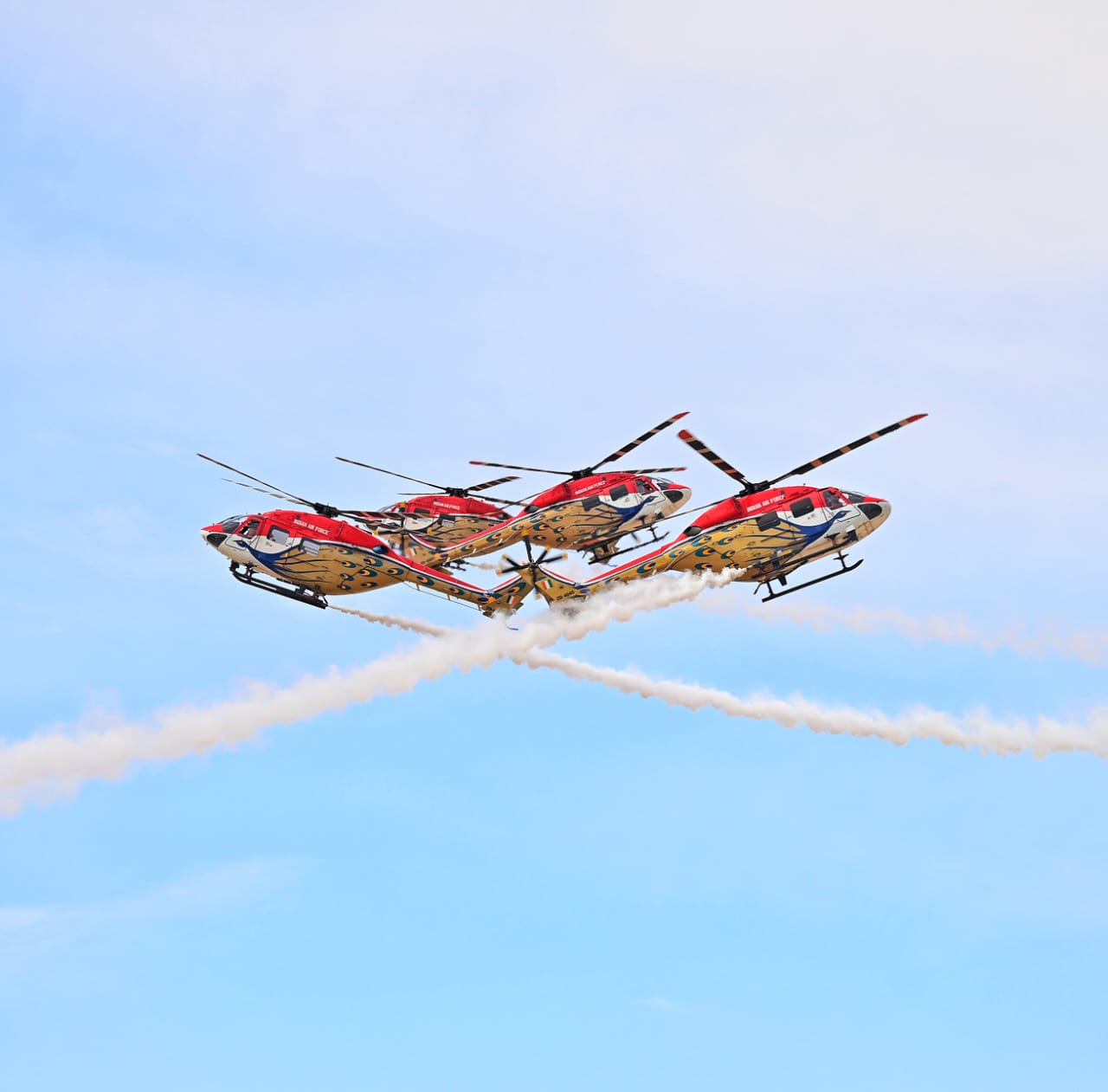
The team uses multiple helicopters in tandem for air displays

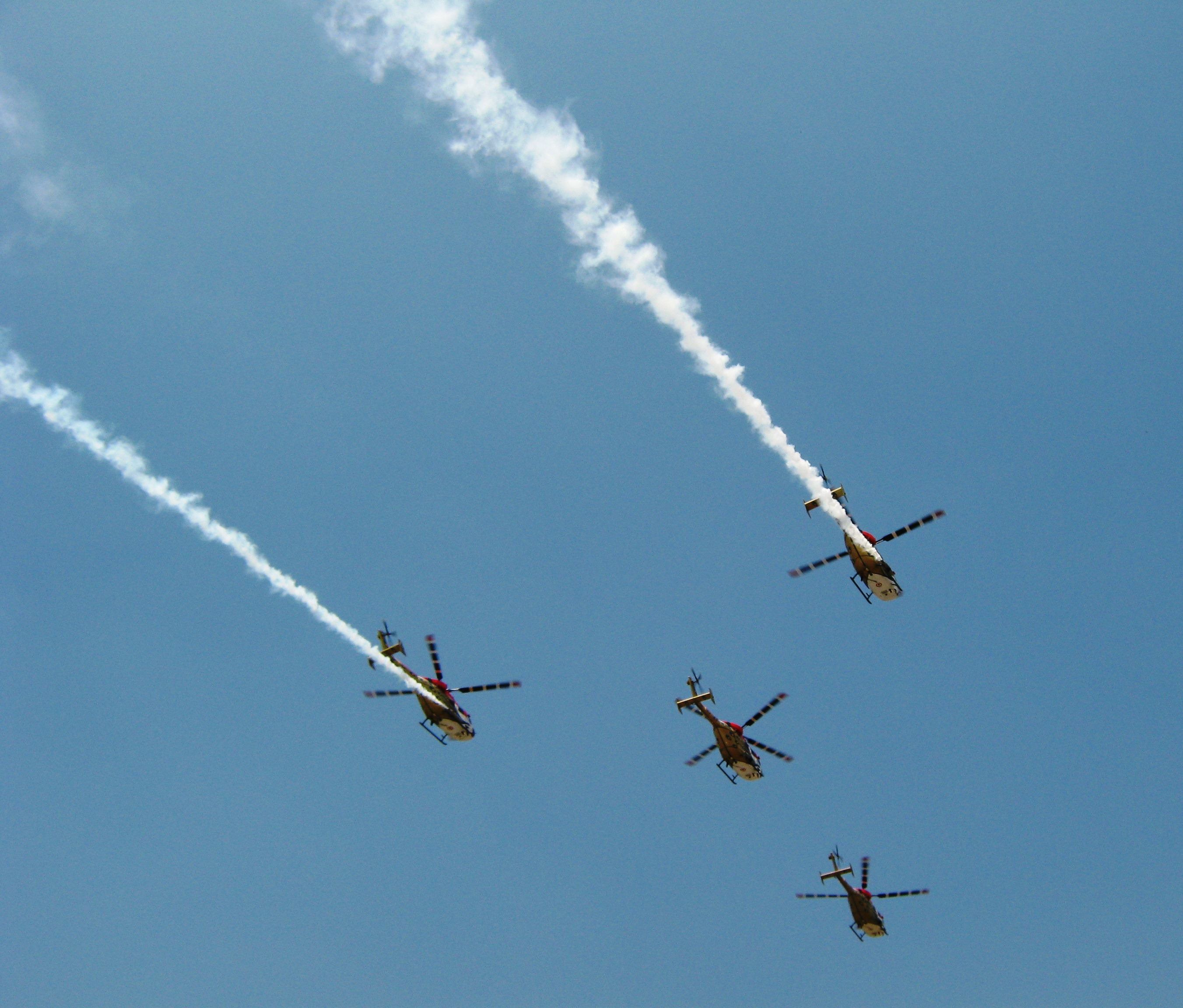
Canisters are used to produce white smoke during air displays

== See also ==
- Surya Kiran
- Sagar Pawan
