= Sulur Air Force Station =

Indian Airforce Base in Coimbatore Tamilnadu India

Sulur Air Force Station Sulur Vanoorthipadai Nilayam
- IATA: none; ICAO: VOSX

Summary
- Airport type: Military
- Owner: Indian Air Force
- Operator: Southern Air Command
- Location: Sulur, Tamil Nadu, India
- Elevation AMSL: 1,250 ft (380 m)
- Coordinates: 11°00′49″N 077°09′35″E

Map
- Location within Tamil Nadu Location within India

Runways
Direction	Length		Surface
Direction	m	ft	Surface
05/23	2,516	8,255	Asphalt

Sulur Air Force Station is an air base of the Indian Air Force located at Sulur near Coimbatore in Tamil Nadu. It is operated by the Southern Air Command and is the second largest air base of the Indian Air Force after the Hindon Air Force Station. The base is tasked with protecting the coasts of Southern India. The base is home to the No. 5 Base Repair Depot and No. 43 Wing of the Indian Air Force. It also serves as one of the operating bases of Garud Commando Force, the special forces unit of the Air Force.

The airbase accommodates a fleet of Antonov An-32 transport aircraft, Mil Mi-17 transport helicopters, HAL Dhruv utility helicopters of the Sarang display team, and HAL Tejas fighter aircraft. It is the only air force station in India which hosts fighters, transport planes, helicopters, microlights, and paragliders at a single venue. The base also hosts repair and overhauling depots, maintenance and storage hangars for aircraft, a flying school and a Type Training School (TETTRA) of the Air Force.

The base was established as a transit base for the Allied forces during the Second World War. It was taken over by the Royal Air Force after the war. After Indian Independence, the base was used by the Indian Navy. In 1956, it was taken over by the Indian Air Force.

== History ==
The Sulur air base was established in the early 1940s by the Royal Navy as RNAS Sulur to serve as a transit base for the Allied forces during the Second World War. The air field was commissioned in 1942 as a Royal Air Force base under the South East Asian Command. The base was burnt down during the Quit India Movement of 1942. It was later handed over to the Royal Navy and was known as HMS Vairi in 1945. The Royal Indian Air Force also started operating from the base. As per Royal Navy report from 1945, the airbase had nine aircraft standing areas, four aprons, 16 aircraft pens, and storage hangars, apart from attached fuel stations, armory, and officer accommodation.

Post Indian independence in 1947, the Indian Navy took over the base and established INS Hansa. In 1956, the Indian Air Force took over the station. It was converted it into a repair station for aircraft and the No. 5 Base Repair Depot (5 BRD) was established at the station. In 1964, the Air Force established a hangars for storage of aircraft, and accommodation for non-commissioned officers. The No.33 Equipment Depot (ED) was commissioned at the airbase in 1967, and the station undertook maintenance and overhaul of Folland Gnats and Avro HS 748 aircraft of the Air Force. The air base provided support for the Indian military operations during the Bangladesh Liberation War in 1971. The No.43 Wing of the Indian Air Force was established at Sulur on 14 October 1985, and took over part of the assets from the No.5 BRD unit. It served as a support base during the deployment of the Indian Peace Keeping Force in Sri Lanka in 1987.

In November 2010, the station became one of the field bases for the Garud Commando Force, an elite special force of the Indian Air Force. Since 2017, the airbase is engaged structural and engine repairs, overhaul, and maintenance of LRUs for the trainer aircraft of the Indian Air Force. It has also assisted in rescue operations such as during the 2018 Kerala floods. In August 2023, a Type Training School (TETTRA) of the Air Force was established at the base. In 2024, the station hosted the first phase of Exercise Tarang Shakti, the largest multinational air force exercise held in India. The air forces of France, Germany, Spain and the United Kingdom took part in the exercise from 6 August to 14 August.

== Infrastructure ==
Sulur Air Force Station is located in Sulur near Coimbatore, and is operated by the Southern Air Command of the Indian Air Force. Spread across an area of 1,050.51 acres (425.13 ha), It is the second largest air base of the Indian Air Force after the Hindon Air Force Station, and is responsible for protecting the coasts of Southern India. The airfield has a single 2,516 m (8,255 ft) long runway designated as 05/23. It is equipped with a category II Instrument Landing System. The base also houses facilities for radio communications, and a transportable radar.

The airbase is equipped with a multi Doppler weather radar for weather services. It has several hangars for the storage of aircraft. The airport also houses a aircraft maintenance and overhaul facility and serves as the base for the No. 5 Base Repair Depot (BRD). It also has facilities for the overhaul, repair, testing and calibration of equipment required for the air force. The base hosts the No.24 Type Training School (TETTRA) of the Air Force, and No.610 unit of the elite Garud Commando Force.

== Operational aircraft ==
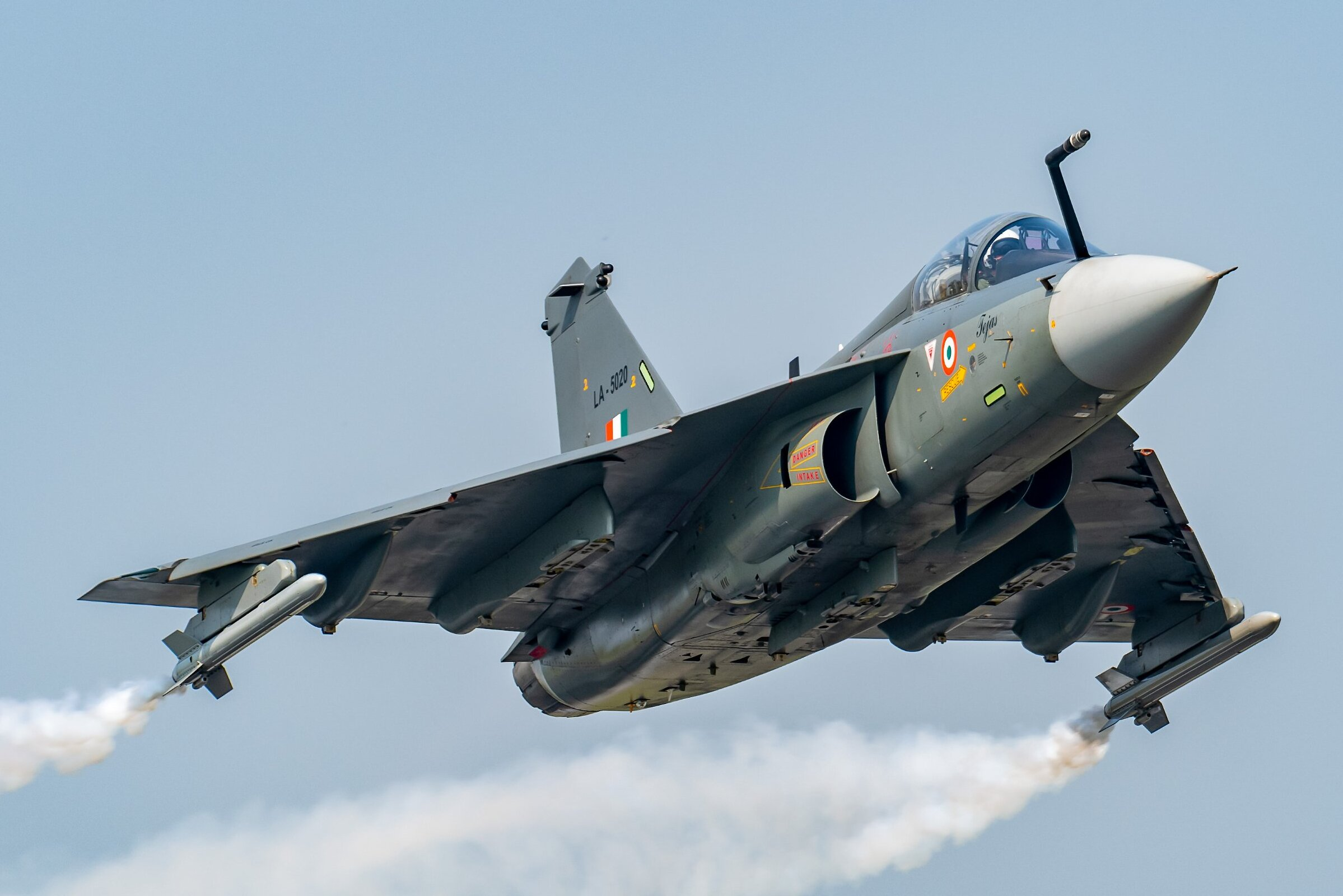
HAL Tejas of the No. 18 Squadron IAF

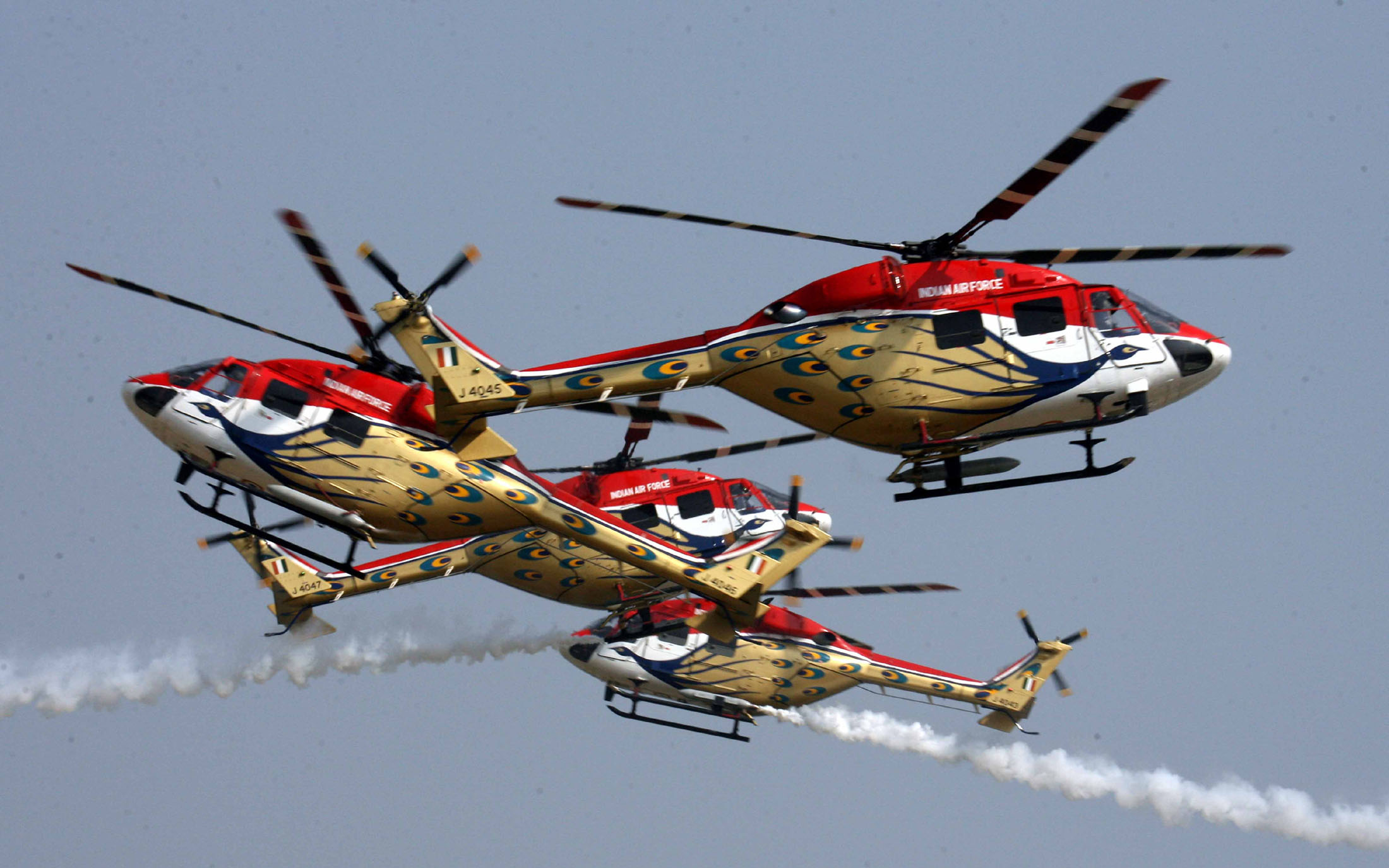
Sarang display team

While operating for the Royal Navy, the base initially hosted transport aircraft such as Beechcraft Expeditor C-2 and At-7, Avro Anson, Fairey Swordfish, Stinson Reliant, Supermarine Walrus, and Sea Otter that were moved from the facility in Coimbatore. Later in 1945, the base was equipped with Fairey Barracuda torpedo bombers. Post Indian Independence, the Indian Navy operated Hawker Sea Hawk, Breguet Alize, and de Havilland Vampire aircraft from the airfield, before they were shifted to Dabolim AFS in 1961. After the No.43 Wing was established in 1985, the No. 18 Squadron IAF was moved to Sulur in January 1985. It operated Folland Gnats out of the airbase till February 1988. The No. 109 Helicopter Unit, which operated Mil Mi-8 helicopters, was moved from Jammu AFS to Sulur on 4 June 1987 and was named as "The Knights".

The No. 119 Helicopter Unit operated Mil-8 helicopters from the airbase from February 1989 to May 1990. The No. 33 Squadron IAF, which operated Antonov An-32 transport aircraft, moved to Sulur in June 1991. It was suspended in July 1992. The base hosted a detachment of No. 11 squadron consisting of Avro HS-748 aircraft was hosted at the base from August 1992 to September 1996. The No. 33 squadron ("Himalayan Geese") was resurrected in March 2000 with An-32 aircraft. In 2008, the Chief of Air Staff indicated that the station would become the base for the indigenous developed HAL Tejas multirole combat aircraft in 2010.

The base hosted Unmanned Aerial Vehicles and microlights in the late 2000s. In February 2016, the Mil-8 helicopters of the No. 109 Helicopter Unit were replaced by Mil Mi-17 transport helicopters. The Sarang display team which was established as No. 151 Helicopter Unit in 2005, was moved from Yelahanka Air Force Station to Sulur in 2009. The team operated modified HAL Dhruvs for aerobatic display. In July 2018, the No. 45 Squadron IAF ("Flying Daggers") was established with a fleet of HAL Tejas aircraft. On 27 May 2020, a second squadron of Tejas aircraft was added as a part of the No. 18 Squadron ("Flying Bullets"). The squadron was later moved to Naliya Air Force Station in September 2024.

Aircraft squadrons
Squadron	Nickname	Date activated (Note: First activation of the squadron at Sulur AFS)	Aircraft	Image
No. 33 Squadron	Himalayan Geese	1 June 1991 (Note: The squadron was suspended on 31 July 1992 and was later resurrected on 27 March 2000.)	Antonov An-32	
No. 45 Squadron	Flying Daggers	1 July 2018	HAL Tejas	
No. 109 Helicopter Unit	Knights	4 June 1987	Mil Mi-17	
No. 151 Helicopter Unit	Sarangs	2009	HAL Dhruv	
