= Surya Kiran =

Indian Air Force aerobatic demonstration unit

Surya Kiran Aerobatic Team (SKAT)
- Surya Kiran seal
- Active: 27 May 1996–30 June 2011; 15 February 2015–present
- Country: India
- Branch: Indian Air Force
- Role: Aerobatic display
- Part of: No. 52 Squadron, IAF
- Garrison/HQ: Bidar Air Force Station
- Nickname: The Sharks
- Mottos: सदैव सर्वोत्तम - Sadaiva Sarvōttama (Sanskrit: "Always the Best")
- Colors: day-glo orange and white
- Decorations: Chief of Air Staff Unit Citation

Commanders
- Current commander: Group Captain Ajay Dasarathi

Aircraft flown
- Trainer: HAL Kiran Mk.2 (1996–2011); BAE Hawk Mk.132 (2015–present)

Surya Kiran (transl. Rays of the Sun) is an aerobatics demonstration team of the Indian Air Force. The Surya Kiran Aerobatic Team (SKAT) was formed in 1996 and is a part of the No. 52 Squadron of the Indian Air Force. The team is based at Bidar Air Force Station in Karnataka and has performed numerous demonstrations. The squadron was initially composed of the HAL HJT-16 Kiran Mk.2 trainer aircraft. The team was suspended in February 2011 and was re-established with BAE Hawk Mk.132 aircraft in 2015.

== History ==
In the late 1940s, the Indian Air Force (IAF) had a display flight squadron which carried out aerobatic displays on special occasions. The team flew Hawker Hunter aircraft and was led by Marshal Arjan Singh. The team led a flypast of more than hundred aircraft on the occasion of India's Independence day in 1947. During the golden jubilee year of the Indian Air Force in 1982, select fighter pilots from various squadrons were assigned to the No. 20 Squadron (Lightnings) to form an aerobatic team called The Thunderbolts. Flying nine blue and white colored Hunter aircraft, the team performed aerobatic displays till 1989.

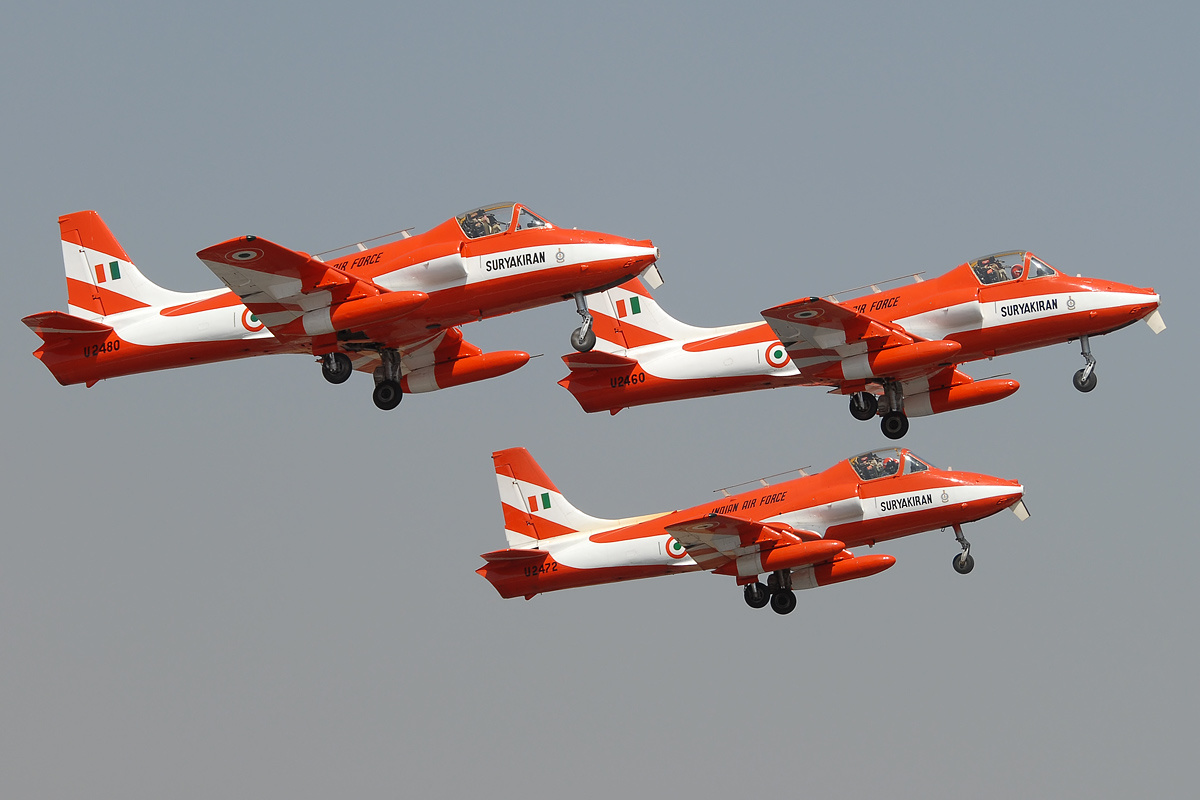
Surya Kiran team flew HAL HJT-16 Kiran aircraft from 1996 to 2011

The Surya Kiran Aerobatic Team (SKAT) was formed in 1996 and was based at Bidar Air Force Station in Karnataka. The team and was initially composed of HAL HJT-16 Kiran Mk.2 trainer aircraft. The team was formed under Wing Commander Kuldeep Malik who had been a member of the Thunderbolts on the eve of Aero India 1996, the first aerospace defense exhibition. The team initially flew four aircraft before moving to six aircraft formation in May 1996. The Surya Kiran team performed their first public display for the golden jubilee celebrations of Air Force Administrative College at Coimbatore on 15 September 1996.

In 1998, under the command of Wing Commander A. K. Murgai, the team expanded to a nine-aircraft formation which was displayed in public for the first time during the Independence Day celebrations in Red Fort. The team became the first Air Force unit to be awarded the Chief of Air Staff Unit Citation, which it received on 8 October 2004. Effective 1 May 2006, the team was accorded a separate squadron, becoming the No. 52 Squadron of the Indian Air Force nicknamed the Sharks. After Aero India 2011, the Surya Kiran team was grounded because the Air Force faced a shortage of Kiran training aircraft. In February 2015, the Surya Kiran team was re-formed with the induction of the British BAe Hawk trainer aircraft under the command of then Wing Commander Ajit Kulkarni.

== Aircraft and organization ==
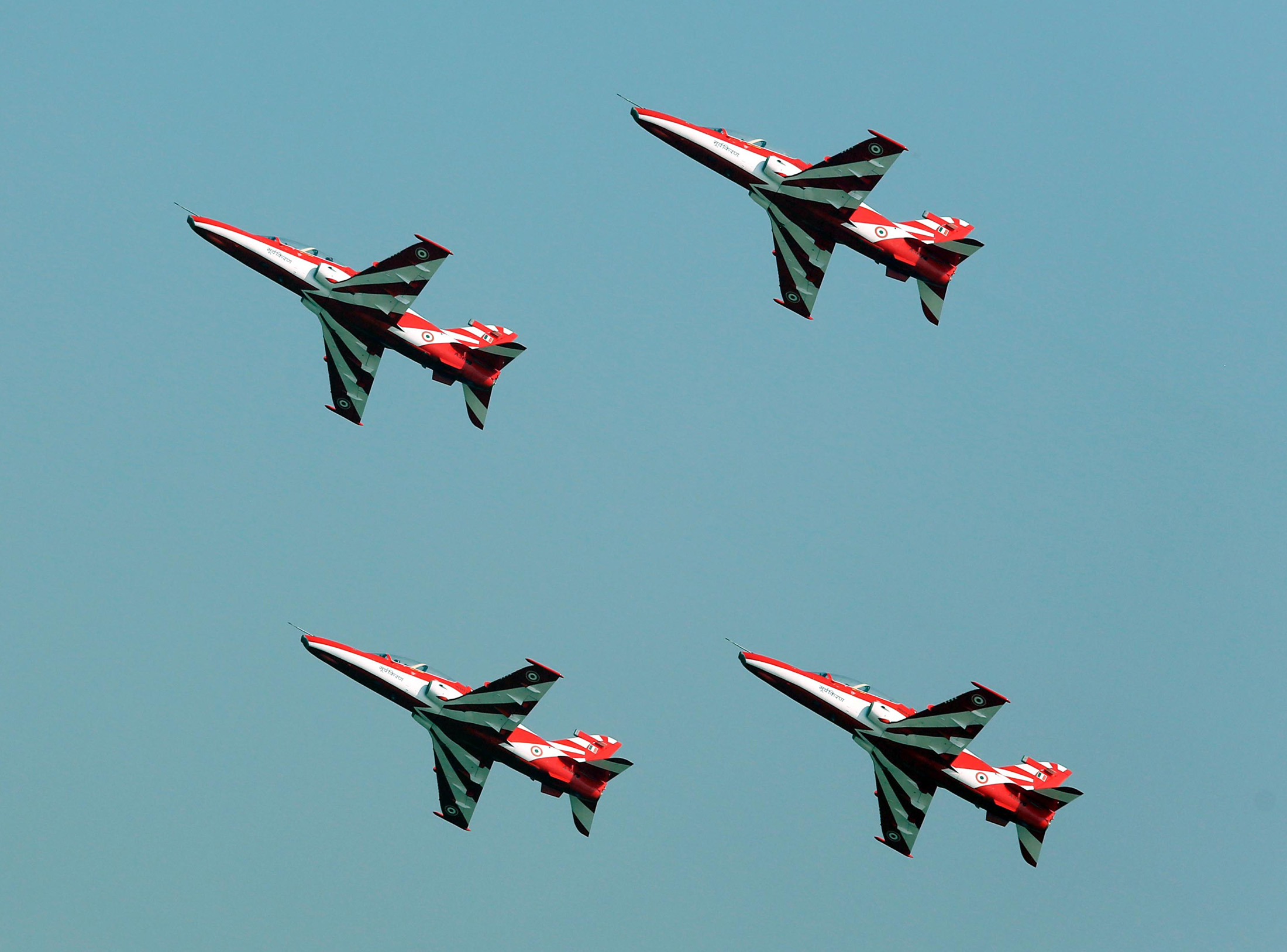
The team uses BAE Systems Hawk Mk.132 aircraft since 2015

The Surya Kiran team operated HAL HJT-16 Kiran Mk.2 trainer aircraft from 1996 to 2011. In October 2015, an agreement was signed for the purchase of twenty BAE Systems Hawk Mk.132 aircraft fitted with smoke canisters dedicated to the aerobatics display role. The team has been utilizing the Hawk aircraft since 2015. The aircraft are painted in bright "day-glo" orange and white colour scheme. The inboard drop tanks of the aircraft are modified to carry color dye mixed with diesel fuel for generating colored smoke.

The team has 13 pilots on roster of which nine fly at any given time. The pilots undergo a selection process twice a year and are chosen to serve for a three-year period. Besides the pilots, the team has a Flight Commander, an administrator and technical officers tasked with the maintenance and servicing of the aircraft.

=== Commanders ===
Commanders of the Surya Kiran Acrobatic Team
Name with Rank	Start	End	Designation	Reference
Wing Commander Kuldeep Malik	1 June 1996	30 March 1997	Team Leader	
Wing Commander Anil Kumar Murgai	31 March 1997	30 May 1999	Team Leader	
Wing Commander Amit Tiwari	31 May 1999	29 November 2001	Team Leader	
Wing Commander Amit Tiwari	30 November 2001	30 May 2002	Commanding Officer	
Wing Commander Sreekumar Prabhakaran	31 May 2002	30 June 2005	Commanding Officer	
Wing Commander Sandeep Bansal	1 July 2005	30 March 2008	Commanding Officer	
Wing Commander Joy Thomas Kurien	31 March 2008	30 June 2010	Commanding Officer	
Wing Commander Ajit Kulkarni	15 February 2015	2018	Commanding Officer	
Group Captain Prashant Grover	2018	19 July 2020	Commanding Officer	
Group Captain Anoop Singh	20 July 2020	2 August 2022	Commanding Officer	
Group Captain Gurpreet Singh Dhillon	3 August 2022	21 October 2024	Commanding Officer	
Group Captain Ajay Dasarathi	22 October 2024	Present	Commanding Officer	

== Performance ==
On an average, the team performs about 30 shows a year, and flies three sorties a day during the training season and two a day whilst on aerobatics display. The modified planes use aerosols to create various flight designs and patterns. The aircraft fly at speeds ranging from 150 km/h (93 mph) to 600 km/h (370 mph) and can reach speeds of up to 1,100 km/h (680 mph) while performing manoeuvres. The maneuvers subject the pilots to alternating g-forces between +6 and –1.5.

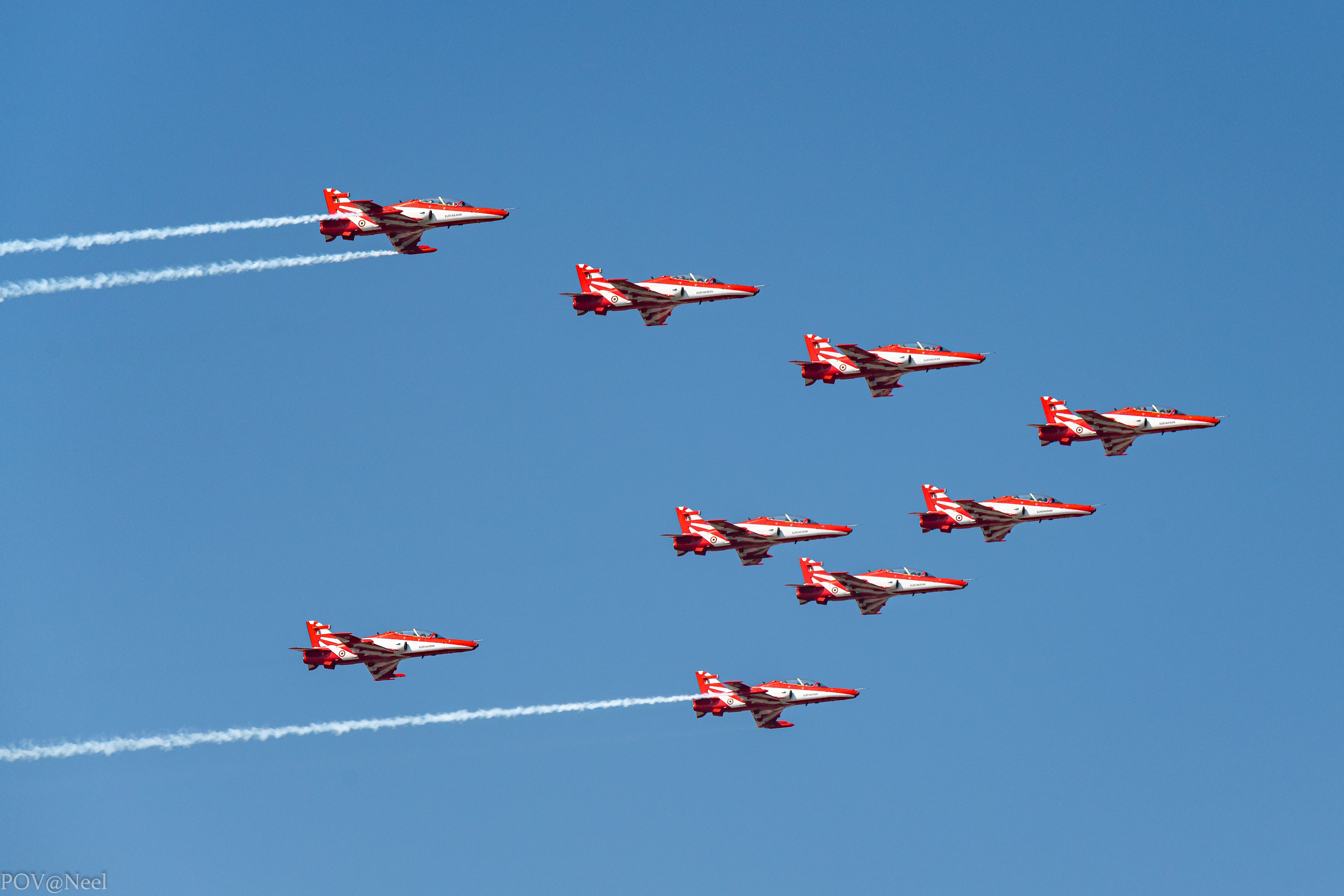
The team generally flies a nine aircraft formation

The Surya Kiran team performed their first public display with six aircraft for the golden jubilee celebrations of Air Force Administrative College at Coimbatore on 15 September 1996. In August 1998, the nine-aircraft formation was displayed in public for the first time during the Independence Day celebrations in New Delhi. The team gave its first performance abroad during the 50th anniversary celebrations of the Sri Lankan Air Force in March 2001. The team has performed over 500 displays in more than 72 cities across India. The team has performed at an altitude of 5,436 ft (1,657 m) in Srinagar and over the seas which is challenging due to the water affecting depth perception.

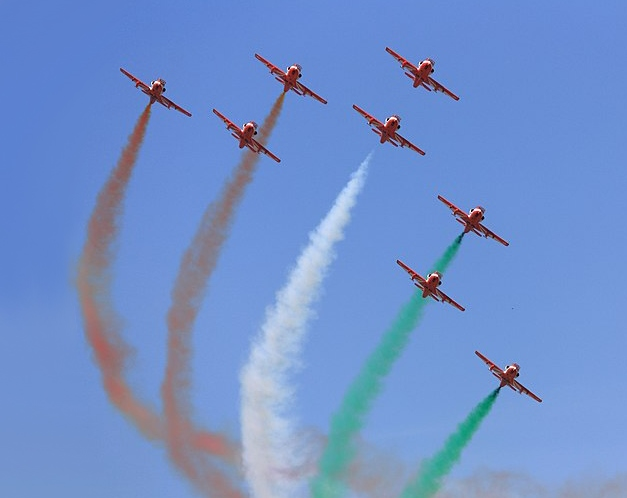
Aerosols mixed with dyes are used to produce colors

The team has also performed in various countries like China, Myanmar, Thailand, Malaysia, Laos and Singapore. The team has performed at multiple Aero India shows. In February 2004, the team performed at the Asian Aerospace air show in Singapore. The team performed in Malaysia in December 2007 at the Langkawi International Maritime and Aerospace Exhibition (LIMA) on the occasion of the 50th Anniversary of Malaysia's Independence. In December 2007, the team in coordination with the Royal Thai Air Force conducted a nine-aircraft display to commemorate the 80th Birth Anniversary of Bhumibol Adulyadej, the King of Thailand. In November 2008, the team was invited to participate in the Zhuhai Airshow in China and the team displayed in Laos during its return. After resurrection in 2015, the team performed their first performance abroad in March 2021 for the 70th anniversary of the Sri Lankan Air Force, exactly 20 years after the team's very first foreign tour. On 19 November 2023, the team performed during the ICC Cricket World Cup final in Ahmedabad. On 6 October 2024, the team performed in the 92nd anniversary celebrations of the Indian Air Force at Marina Beach in Chennai. The team performed in Mehsana on 24 October 2025.

== Incidents ==
- On 18 March 2006, a HJT-16 Kiran aircraft of the team crashed during practice near Bidar and resulted in the deaths of Wing Commander Dheeraj Bhatia and Squadron Leader Shailender Singh.
- On 23 December 2007, a HJT-16 Kiran aircraft of the team crash-landed at the Biju Patnaik Airport and the pilot sustained minor injuries.
- On 21 January 2009, Wing Commander R. S. Dhaliwal was killed when his airplane crashed during practice near Bellura village in Karnataka at about 8:45 am.
- On 19 February 2019, two BAe Hawk aircraft of the team collided at 11:50 am near Bengaluru while practicing for the Aero India 2019. While all three crew members ejected after the accident, Wing Commander Sahil Gandhi succumbed to his injuries later.

== See also ==
- Sarang
- Sagar Pawan
