= Sagar Pawan =

Indian Navy Aerobatic Team

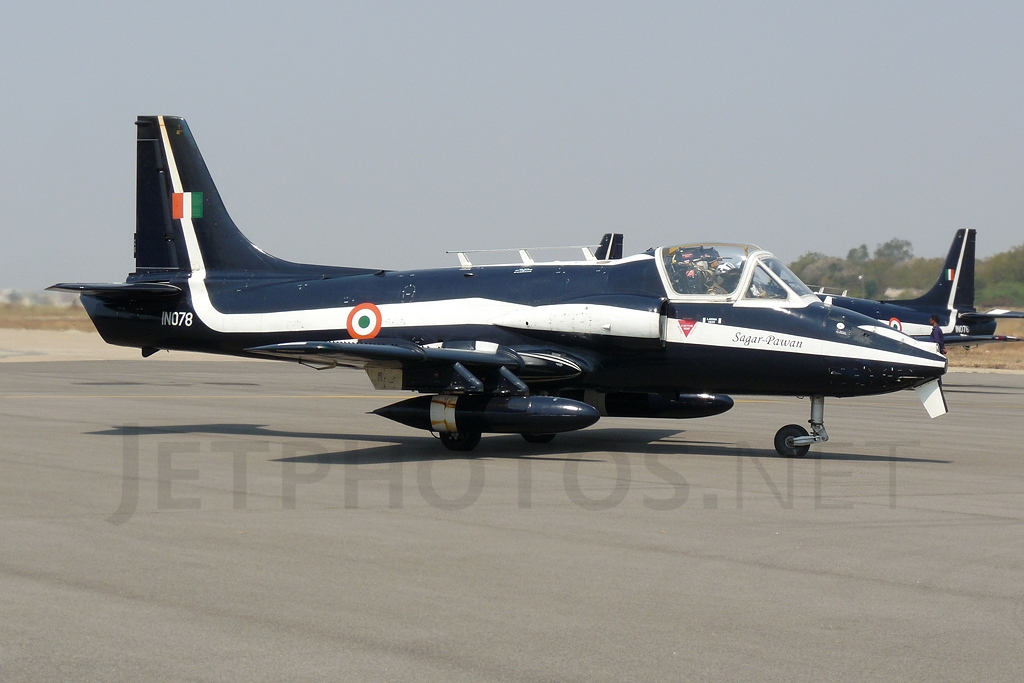
- HJT-16 Kiran of Sagar Pawan
- Active: 2003-2010
- Disbanded: 2010
- Country: India
- Branch: Indian Navy
- Role: Aerobatic display
- Garrison/HQ: INS Hansa, Dabolim, Goa
- Colors: Dark blue and white

Aircraft flown
- Trainer: HAL Kiran

Sagar Pawan (transl. Sea breeze) was an aerobatics demonstration team of the Indian Navy's aviation arm. The team was formed as a part of squadron 551 in 2003. While in operation, it was one of the only two naval aerobatic teams in the world along with the Blue Angels of the US Navy.

The team used four modified Hindustan Aeronautics HJT-16 Kiran trainer aircraft, painted in dark blue and white colour scheme. The team was based out of INS Hansa in Dabolim, Goa and had performed across India on various occasions such as the Navy Day celebrations. In late 2010, the team was disbanded due to the shortage of Kiran training aircraft.

== History ==
The Sagar Pawan team was established as a part of the Indian Naval Air Arm squadron 551 in 2003. While in operation, it was one of the two naval aerobatic teams in the world part from the Blue Angels of the US Navy. It operated a fleet of HAL HJT-16 Kiran aircraft, painted in dark blue and white colour scheme. The team was based out INS Hansa at Dabolim, Goa.

The team performs using four aircraft and the aircraft are modified to generate colored smoke for displays. The team had performed across various venues in India and on occasions such as the Navy Day celebrations.

In late 2010, the team was disbanded due to the shortage Kiran training aircraft. Commander of the squadron Thiagarajan said that the team would resume the aerobatic displays once the training schedule relaxed and that new BAE Systems Hawk aircraft would be inducted by 2013-14.

== Incidents ==
On 3 March 2010, a HJT-16 Kiran aircraft of the team crashed in Hyderabad while performing in an airshow. Commander Suresh Kumar Maurya and Lt Commander Rahul Nair were killed in the crash.

== See also ==
- Surya Kiran
- Sarang
