= Aero India Seminar =

Aero India Seminar is a biennial seminar held in Bangalore, India. It is jointly organized by Defence Research and Development Organisation (DRDO), Ministry of Defence, Government of India and Aeronautical Society of India (AeSI). The seminar precedes the Aero India airshow and exhibition held in Yelahanka Airforce Station, Bangalore.

== History ==
The first edition was conducted in 1996. Subsequently, eight more editions have been successfully completed until 2013. The ninth edition of the seminar was held from 4 to 6 February 2013.

== Motivation ==
Dr. V. K Saraswat, Scientific Advisor to Defence Minister, Chairman of the Seminar Advisory Committee in his invitation for AeroIndia Seminar 2011 has succinctly brought out the motivation behind the Aero India Seminar.

Aero India Seminar is aimed at providing the scientist, industry players, academia and Operator a platform to explore and exploit current technologies, examine future trends and prepare the road map for the next decade. Synergistic interaction amongst various stakeholders during the seminar would make this a reality

== Aero India Seminar 2007 ==
The sixth edition of the Aero India Seminar was conducted between 5 and 8 February 2007. The theme was Aerospace Technologies: Challenges and Opportunities. Dr. G Madhavan Nair, Chairman ISRO, released the Seminar Proceedings. Mr. M Natarajan, SA to RM released the book "Vision 2020 Aerospace in India"

== Aero India Seminar 2009 ==
The seventh edition of the Seminar was conducted between 9 and 11 February 2009. The theme was Aerospace – Perspectives and Trends in Technologies. Mr. M Natarajan, SA to RM released the Seminar Proceedings. Mr. Ashok K Bawaja, Chairman Hindustan Aeronautics Limited, India released the "Special Issue of the Journal of AeSI"

== Aero India Seminar 2011 ==
The eighth edition of the Seminar was conducted between 7 and 9 February 2011. The theme was Aero & Space Technologies: Success Through Global Co-Operation. Mr. M Natarajan, SA to RM released the Seminar Proceedings. Mr. Ashok K Bawaja, Chairman Hindustan Aeronautics Limited, India released the "Special Issue of the Journal of AeSI"

== Aero India Seminar 2013 ==
The ninth edition held from 4 to 6 February 2013 was themed around "Aerospace Products: Challenges in Design to Deployment". 1089 delegates attended the seminar. This included scientists, engineers, service officers, students, academics and invitee delegates from the sponsors. Mr Phil Boyle, President of the Royal Aeronautical Society, UK and Dr G.M.Rao, President, Aeronautical Society of India were the guests of honour during the inauguration of the seminar on 4 Feb 2013. Shri A K Antony, Hon'ble Minister of Defence, Air Chief Mshl NAK Browne PVSM AVSM VM ADC and Shri RK Mathur, Secretary, Defence Production were the guests of honour during the inauguration of the Plenary Sessions on 5 Feb 2013. 61 papers were presented during the seminar, with 27 authors invited from abroad and 23 authors invited from India. Apart from the invited papers, there were 12 contributed papers from ISRO, DRDO, HAL and BEL.
