= Bidar Air Force Station =

IAF's advanced fighter pilot training centre

- ಬೀದರ್ ಏರ್ ಫೋರ್ಸ್ ಸ್ಟೇಷನ್
- Part of Training Command, Indian Air Force
- Naubad, Bidar, Karnataka in India
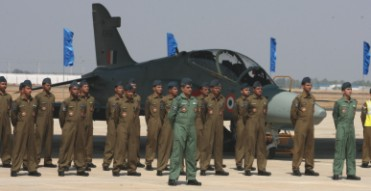
- Bidar Air Force Station

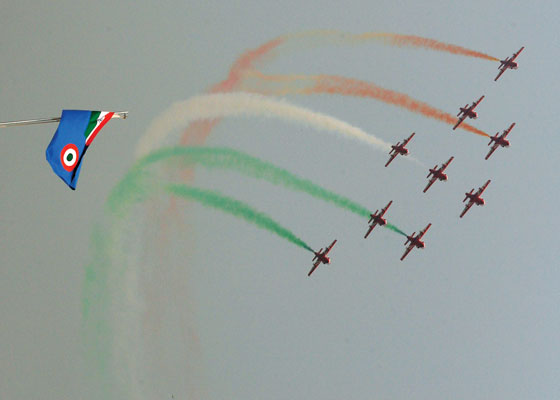
- Show of 52 Squadron IAF, Surya Kiran, Air Force Station Bidar

Site information
- Type: Indian Air Force flight Flying Training Station
- Code: VOBR
- Owner: Ministry of Defence
- Operator: Indian Air Force
- Controlled by: Training Command
- Open to the public: No
- Condition: Operational (1963–present)
- Website: www.indianairforce.nic.in

Location
- Location in India
- Coordinates: 17.9°N 77.47°E
- Height: 2,178 feet (664 m)

Site history
- Built: 1943 or 1947
- Built by: Government of India; Ministry of Defence
- In use: Training Command Center
- Fate: In 2011, the station was remodeled and refurbished, with the runway extended to 9000 feet and new facilities for aircraft engine maintenance and testing added

Garrison information
- Current commander: Abhijeet Nene
- Past commanders: Air Chief Marshal PV Naik
- Garrison: No. 52 Squadron IAF
- Occupants: No. 52 Squadron IAF

Airfield information
- Identifiers: IATA: IXX, ICAO: VOBR
Runways
Direction	Length and surface
02/20	Asphalt/Concrete
08	Asphalt/Concrete
Bidar Air Force Station
Aircraft flown
- Fighter: HAL HT-2; HAL HJT-16 Kiran; Kiran Mk II; BAE Hawk Advanced
- Trainer: Hawk MK 132 (November 2007-present); Kiran MKII (till July 2012)

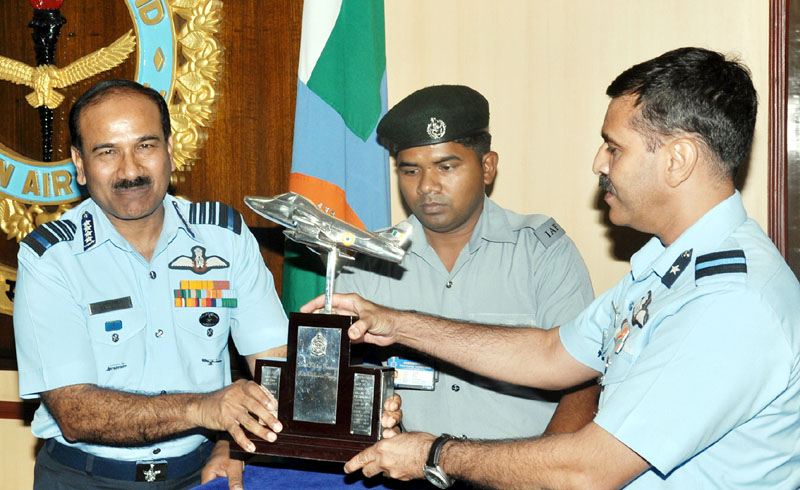
The Chief of the Air Staff, Air Chief Marshal Arup Raha presenting the Best Flying Training Establishment Trophy to the Air Officer Commanding, Air Force Station, Bidar, Air Commodore M. Khanna, during the Annual Commanders’ Conference of Training Command, at Bangalore on 15 May 2014.

Bidar Air Force Station, (Kannada: ಬೀದರ್ ಏರ್ ಫೋರ್ಸ್ ಸ್ಟೇಷನ್) (Hindi: बीदर वायु सेना स्टेशन), is a second largest flight training center in India. It is established by the Indian Air Force and It was founded during World War II and has been a training center for Indian Air Force pilots since 1963. Trainer aircraft like the HAL HT-2 and variants of HAL HJT-16 Kiran have been used at the airbase for nearly four decades. In 2011, the station was remodeled and refurbished, with the runway extended to 9000 feet and new facilities for aircraft engine maintenance and testing added.

Bidar Air Force Station is home to the second biggest training center in India, providing further training to graduates of the Indian Air Force Academy before they are assigned to combat units. 60-90 sorties per day are flown from the base, generating the highest number of single-engine flying hours in India.

Once the home base for the air force's No. 52 Squadron, the station now houses the three Hawk Operational Training Squadrons (HOTS-A Aggressors, HOTS-B Bravehearts, and HOTS-C Cheetahs). A fourth squadron is ready to be raised shortly. The Weapon System Operators' School also functions here.

== Location ==
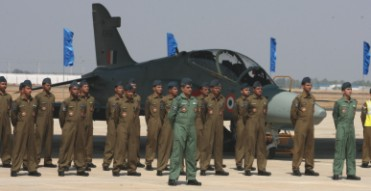
Hawk Operational Training Squadron, Air Force Station Bidar

Bidar is located in Karnataka, India. Its location on the Deccan Plateau provides protection from the tropical conditions that are experienced on the coast and favorable year-round flying conditions, allowing even non-instrument rated trainees to fly for most of the year.

== Courses ==
AFS Bidar is instrumental in providing pilot training for fighter jets, with the base offering stage-III training in Advanced Jet Training (AJT). The operational and fighter trainer roles of this Advanced Jet Trainer have been successfully demonstrated by prominent air powers worldwide.

The pilots undergo 52 weeks of flight training conducted in four stages and graduate in the Pilots Course and Weapons Systems Operators Course (WSOC) on the Hawk Mk 132 fighter aircraft.

== Aircraft ==
=== Kiran Mk II ===
In July 2012, the final Kiran Mk II aircraft flew out of Bidar to the Tambaram Air Force Station. This aircraft had been in service at Bidar for almost three decades.

=== Hawk Mk 132 ===
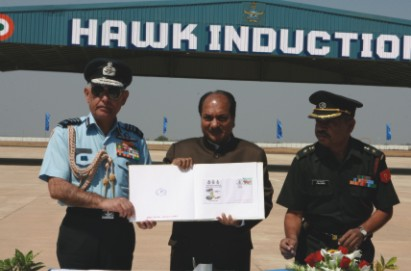
Hawk Induction Ceremony at AFS Bidar

Flight training at Bidar is now done on the Hawk Mk 132 aircraft. The Hawk brings a step-up in capability as a training aircraft, bridging the gap between the basic piston-engined trainer and the high-performance flying of an advanced fighter aircraft.

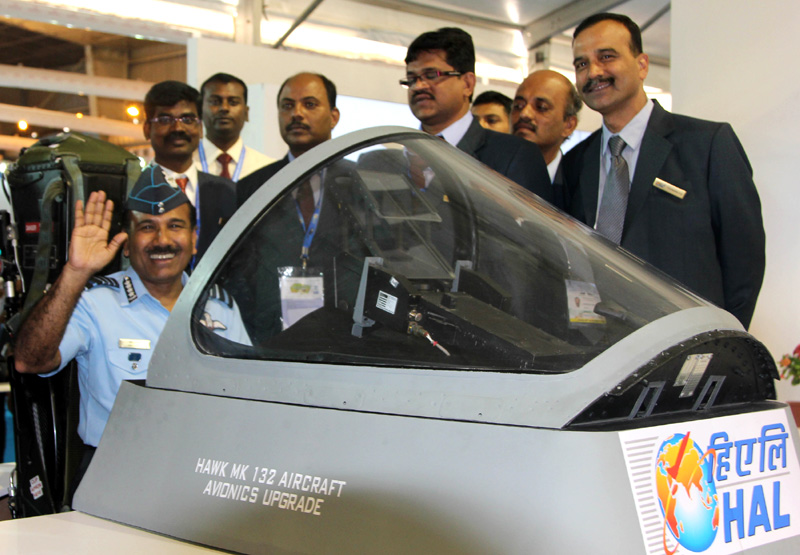
The Chief of the Air Staff, Air Chief Marshal Arup Raha in a HAWK MK 132 simulator at Hindustan Aeronautics Ltd., during the Aero India-2015, in Bangalore on 19 February 2015.

The Stage-III training, ahead of the pilots graduating to the supersonic jets such as MiG-21s, Jaguars, Mirages and Sukhoi SU-30MKIs is carried out at Bidar.

== Surya Kiran Aerobatic Team ==
The Indian air force's Surya Kiran Aerobatic Team (SKAT) flew its first six aircraft formation sortie on May 27, 1996 from the Bidar Air Force Station. Unlike other aerobatic teams, which fly either frontline fighter aircraft or advanced jet trainers, SKAT previously flew the Kiran MK II indigenous basic jet trainer. The team was suspended in February 2011 and was re-established with Hawk Mk-132 aircraft in 2017.

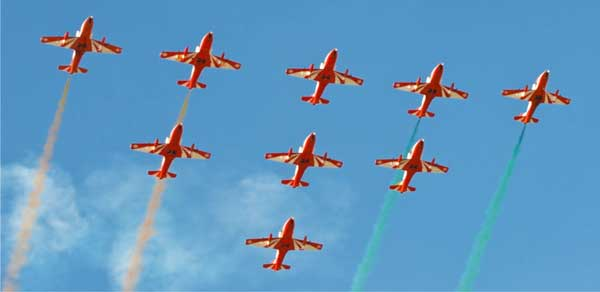
Surya Kirans in display for the last time in Aero India 2011

=== History ===
The Formation Aerobatic Team has been associated with Bidar AFS since 1990 with the arrival of a four-aircraft team called the Formation Aerobatic Team from Thunderbolts, which used Hawker Hunter fighters. The SKAT was born in 1996 and developed over time. It was conferred with Squadron status in 2006.

=== Training ===
Pilots serving as Qualified Flying Instructors (QFIs) with approximately 1,000 hours of experience on fighter aircraft can volunteer to be a part of the SKAT. Volunteers are invited to fly with the team, where their performance and personality traits are evaluated. Over a period of approximately 6 months, selected pilots then fly 70–75 sorties practising various manoeuvres before they are admitted to the formation flying team.

The average tenure of a SKAT pilot is about three years. Two new pilots join the team every six months. Starting at high altitude with a single aircraft sortie, with the team leader or the deputy team leader in the Kiran's left-hand seat, the trainee moves on to two-aircraft and then three-aircraft formation flying. After mastering the skill of flying with two aircraft on either side, the trainee then goes in for four-aircraft and six-aircraft sorties before finally graduating to nine-aircraft sorties. All types of rolls, loops, dives, and formations are flown at various training stages.

=== Composition ===
The team is led by a commanding officer who is also the leader of the formation during display sorties. The squad has 13 pilots, out of whom nine perform at any given time. Since their inception in 1996, these display aircraft have enthralled audiences with their maneuvers. Senior and experienced fighter pilots are chosen to be part of the prestigious SKAT, which uses the IAF's basic HJT-16 Kiran Mk-2 trainer aircraft. It has now used the Hawk Mk-132 aircraft since 2017.

=== Formations and Maneuvers ===
- The most popular and also the most dangerous formation of the SKAT has been of the nine aircraft taking off in a V-shaped formation of three and joining up in close formation, maneuvering between speeds of 150 and 650 km per hour with their wing tips five metres apart.
- Six Kiran trainer jets streak barely 50 metres above the ground in an arrowhead formation. With their wingtips separated by five metres, they move into a diamond formation and roll towards their left to form a "card" formation with three aircraft flying abreast and another three trailing just behind.
- Reforming again after "synchro head-on cross", where two aircraft on the same level cross each other at a relative speed of 1100 km/h with a separation of just five metres, the brightly painted red and white aircraft, with their exhausts trailing smoke, dive vertically and then pull up again in different directions to simulate a bomb burst.

== Accidents ==
- On March 18, 2006, Wing Commander Dheeraj Bhatia and Squadron Leader Shailendra Singh were killed while flying the Kiran aircraft. This was the first-ever crash involving a Surya Kiran team.
- on January 21, 2009, an Indian Air Force Kiran on a routine practise session crashed near Bidar, killing Wing Commander Daliwal. This was the second fatal Surya Kiran air mishap.

== Distinguished Officers ==
- Flight Lieutenant Rajika Sharma of the Station was the first woman officer of the Indian Air Force to scale Mount Everest. She was a MET officer posted to the station when she achieved this distinction.
- Air Marshal Ramesh Rai commanded the Bidar Air Force Station, and the Advance HQ at Kolkata. The HAWK advanced jet trainers (AJT) were inducted during his tenure at Bidar, wherein he pioneered the training system for the AJT. He served as the Chief of Central Air Command before taking over as AOC-in-C, Training Command.
- Air Marshal Paramjit Singh Gill AVSM VM, Senior Air Staff Officer (SASO) of WAC, was Chief Instructor (CI) at Air Force Stn Bidar.
- Air Marshal VR Iyer, Air Officer in Charge of Personnel at Air HQ, being a qualified flying instructor, has imparted training at Air Force Station Bidar.
- The AFS Bidar was commanded by Air Chief Marshal PV Naik VSM ADC.

== CAG Audit ==
Report of the Comptroller and Auditor General of India for the year ended March 2015 has identified an over-provision of hangars in the airbase, leading to an unnecessary expenditure of 24.28 crore due to an inaccurate projection of requirements. During the planning of constructing a new Hangar (Number 6) at AFS Bidar, the CAG found the excess capacity assumed for the work services.

In the previous year — 2014, CAG pointed out that the resurfacing of extended portion of runways (numbered 02/20 and 08/26) was planned arbitrarily and it was carried out without the approval of Ministry of Defence. The report showed "injudicious expenditure" amounting to 1.48 crore at the airbase.

== Trivia ==
- In 2015, a significant historical event took place on 15 December when Air Marshal Kulwant Singh Gill, the Air Officer Commanding-in-Chief of Central Air Command, conducted a close formation sortie on a Hawk Mk132 aircraft. Accompanying him in this remarkable feat was his son, Flying Officer Shahbeg Gill, who was also a member of the same aerobatic formation team. This momentous occasion marked a milestone in the AFS Bidar as well as IAF's history.
- IAF's first women fighter pilots — Avani Chaturvedi, Bhawana Kanth & Mohana Singh — started their simulation training on the Hawk Advanced Jet Trainer at AFS Bidar in August 2016.
- On 15 August 2018, the much-awaited Surya Kiran aerobatic show for the local audience in Bidar, which was scheduled after a gap of 10 years and was supposed to feature nine Hawk Mark 132 planes performing a range of maneuvers as a part of Independence Day celebrations, had to be cancelled due to unfavorable weather conditions.
- On 30 May 2022, Air Commodore Sanjay Sharma and Flying Officer Ananya Sharma achieved a historic milestone by flying together in the same formation of Hawk-132 aircraft at Air Force Station Bidar. This remarkable feat was accomplished by the father-daughter duo, marking a significant moment in aviation history of IAF. Sanjay Sharma was commissioned in 1989 while Ananya Sharma was inducted in 2021.

== Galleries ==
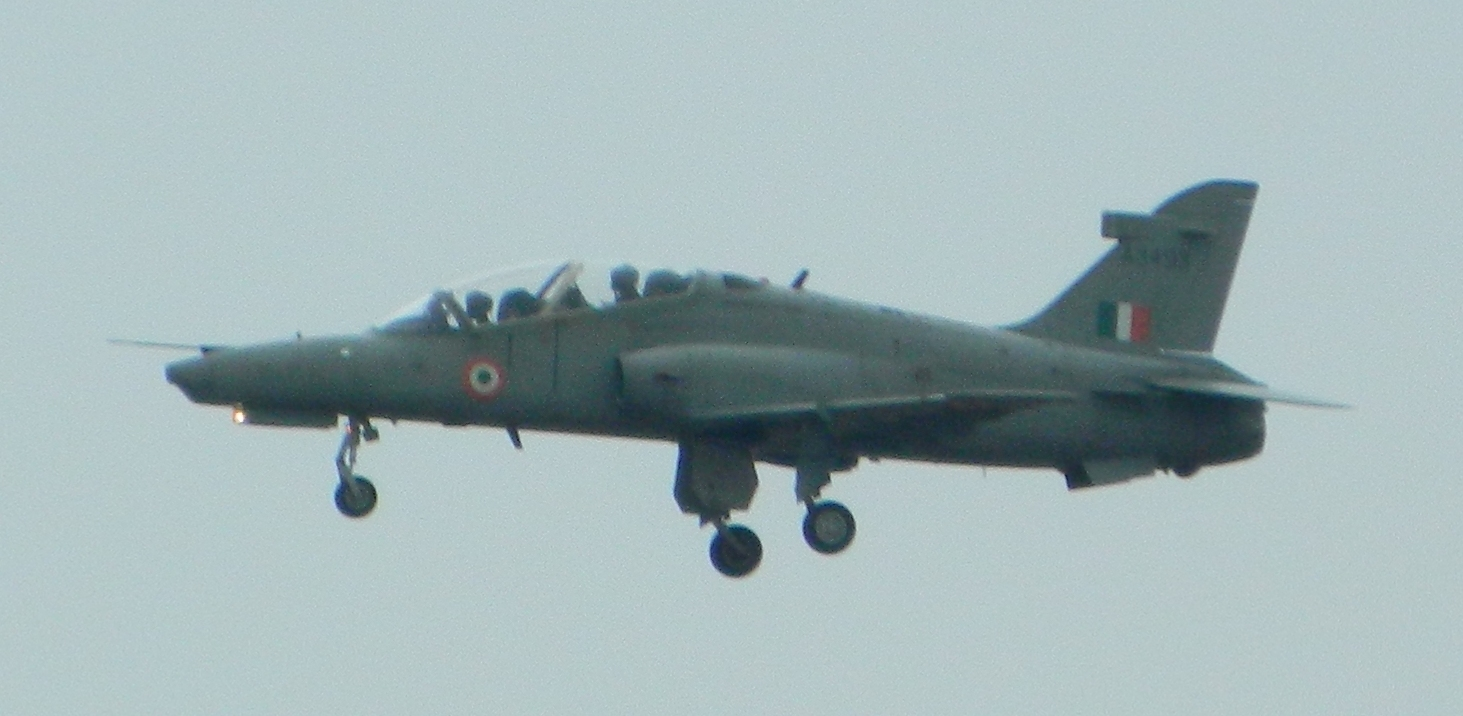
Hawk flying over AFS Bidar

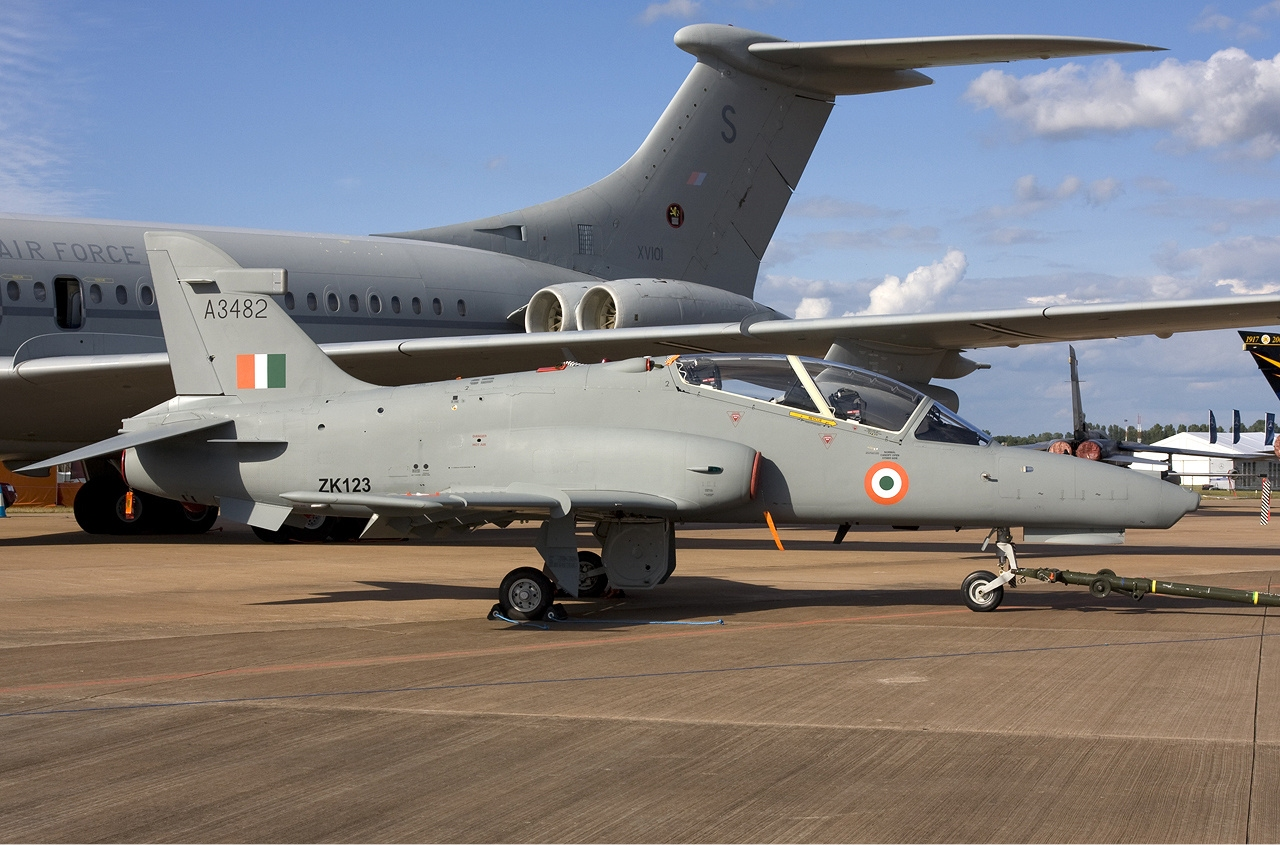
Indian Air Force BAE Systems Hawk 132 Lofting-1
