= MSME & Startups Forum - Bharat =

- Formation: 2020; 6 years ago
- Type: Non-profit
- Purpose: Facilitate entrepreneurs and businesses to Self-Reliant India policy framework
- Location: Varanasi, India
- Region served: India
- Key people: Mr. Manoj Kumar Shah (founder and CEO)
- Website: msmestartupsforum.org

MSME & Startups Forum – Bharat is an Indian nonprofit organization founded in 2020 to facilitate entrepreneurs and businesses to heed the Prime Minister of India Narendra Modi's call for AtmaNirbharBharat (Self reliant India) and #VocalForLocal campaign.

It is an Indian non-governmental organization that provides a platform for Indian Micro, Small and Medium Enterprises (MSMEs) & startups.

The founder and national president Mr. Manoj Kumar Shah called on the union of the minister of Road Transport & Highways and the Minister of Micro, Small and Medium Enterprises (MSME), Mr. Nitin Gadkari on 1 March 2021.

The Forum has an expansive presence. It has 145 chapters in India, across 27 states and 5 union territories, covering a total of 90 cities. It also has 10 cross-border chapters.

== Events ==
- Forum organised online webinar on 9 June 2021 with Om Prakash Sakhlecha Ji- Hon. Minister – MSME & IT, Government of Madhya Pradesh Madhya Pradesh
- Forum organised online webinar on 27 March 2021 with union minister of Road Transport & Highways and the Minister of Micro, Small and Medium Enterprises (MSME), Sri. Nitin Gadkari
