= Yelahanka Air Force Station =

- IATA: none; ICAO: VOYK

Summary
- Airport type: Military
- Owner/Operator: Indian Air Force
- Location: Yelahanka, Bengaluru, Karnataka
- Elevation AMSL: 2,912 ft (888 m)
- Coordinates: 13°08′09″N 77°36′27″E

Map
- Location within Karnataka Location within India

Runways
Direction	Length		Surface
Direction	m	ft	Surface
09/27	3,004	9,858	Asphalt

The Yelahanka Air Force Station is an Indian Air Force airfield in Yelahanka, Bengaluru. The main role of this airfield is to train pilots to fly transport planes. This station also conducts type-conversion of navigators on the Antonov An-32.

The station undertakes logistics support tasks allotted by Air HQs and HQ TC. Every two odd years, Aero India, a biennial air show takes place at Yelahanka air force station. Since 2013, Mi-8, An-32 and Dornier planes are positioned at AFS Yelahanka. It had formerly hosted a HAL Tejas aircraft squadron, before it was moved to Sulur Airforce Station. It is 22 km from Bengaluru city railway station.

== History ==
The site was formerly (British) Royal Air Force Yelahanka (RAF Yelahanka) and opened in 1942. The following units were here at some point:

- No. 5 Squadron RAF (1946 & 1947)
- No. 11 Squadron RAF (1943)
- No. 30 Squadron RAF (1944)
- No. 42 Squadron RAF (1942 & 1943)
- No. 45 Squadron RAF (1944)
- No. 47 Squadron RAF (1944)
- No. 60 Squadron RAF (1943) & 1945)
- No. 79 Squadron RAF (1944)
- No. 84 Squadron RAF (1943 & 1944)
- No. 110 Squadron RAF (1944-45)
- No. 113 Squadron RAF (1943)
- No. 123 Squadron RAF (1944)
- No. 134 Squadron RAF (1944)
- No. 135 Squadron RAF (1943)
- No. 146 Squadron RAF (1944)
- No. 152 Squadron RAF (1946)
- No. 211 Squadron RAF (1945)
- No. 258 Squadron RAF (1944)
- No. 261 Squadron RAF (1944)
- No. 684 Squadron RAF (1944-45)
- No. 1302 Flight RAF

== See also ==
- List of Indian Air Force Bases
