= HAL HJT-16 Kiran =

Indian jet trainer aircraft

HJT-16 Kiran
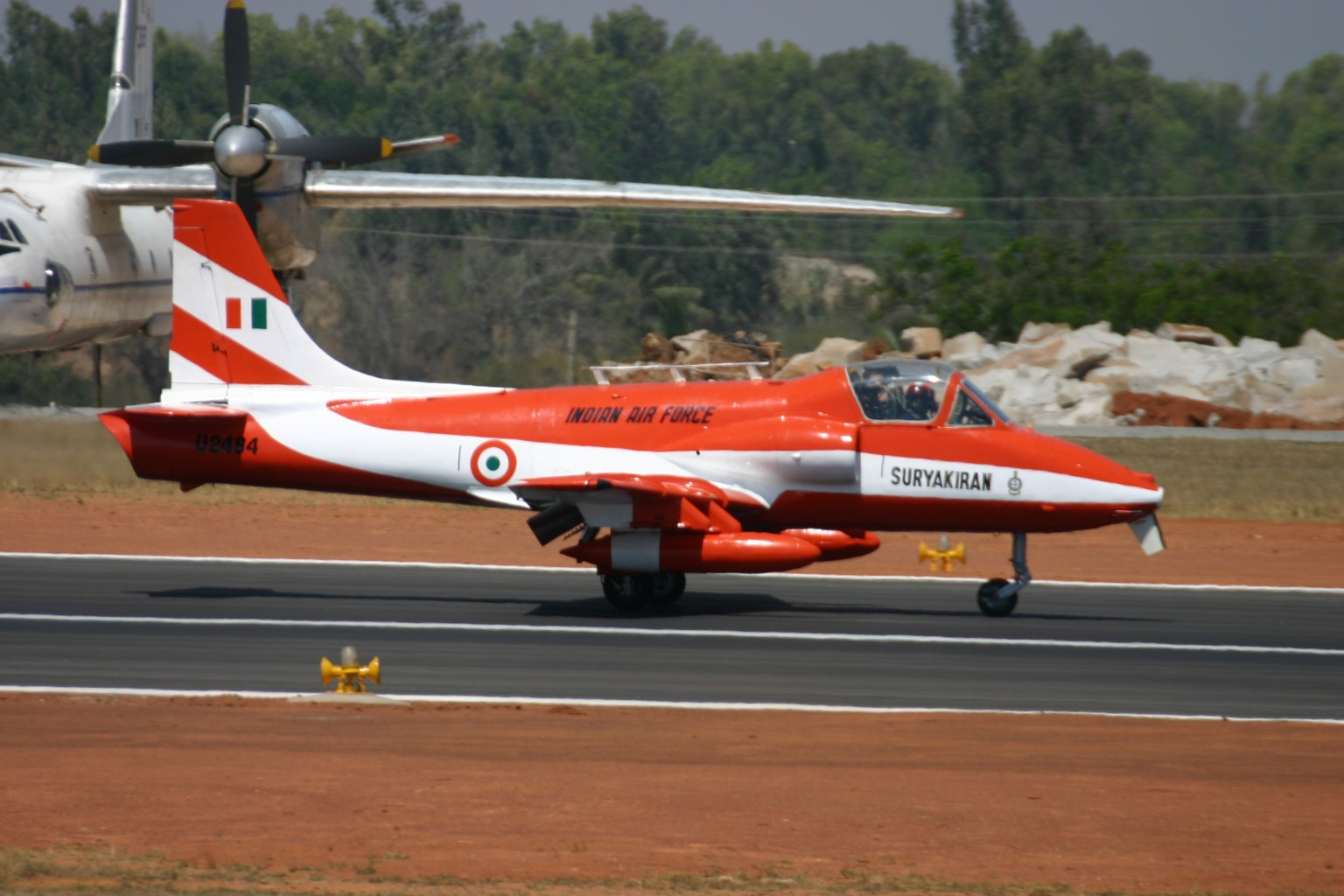
- A HAL HJT-16 Kiran of the Indian Air Force

General information
- Type: Intermediate jet trainer
- National origin: India
- Manufacturer: Hindustan Aeronautics Limited
- Status: In service
- Primary users: Indian Air Force Indian Navy
- Number built: 190

History
- Manufactured: 1964 -1989
- Introduction date: 1968
- First flight: 4 September 1964
- Developed into: HAL HJT-36 Yashas

The HAL HJT-16 Kiran (lit. 'Ray of light') is an Indian two-seat intermediate jet-powered trainer aircraft designed and manufactured by aircraft company Hindustan Aeronautics Limited (HAL).

The Kiran was developed at the behest of the Indian Air Force (IAF), who sought a new intermediate trainer aircraft for its pilots. On 4 September 1964, the type performed its maiden flight; mass production commenced shortly thereafter. It has been adopted by the IAF, which uses the type to conduct intermediate training of pilots following on from basic trainers such as the HPT-32 Deepak and Pilatus PC-7. Furthermore, during the 1980s, the IAF procured a number of Kirans that were furnished with a more powerful engine and a higher number of hard points; the variant was designated Kiran Mk II. It has also been adopted by the Indian Naval Air Arm. The last Kiran was completed during 1989, after which the assembly line was shuttered.

The Kiran has been in operational use for over 50 years. Since the late 1990s, an indigenously designed successor, the HAL HJT-36 Sitara, has been in development, but has yet to enter service as of 2019. By the 2010s, use of the type was gradually declining as increasing numbers of newer BAE Systems Hawks, built under license by HAL, have been introduced to IAF service. The Kiran has been used by the Indian naval aerobatic team Sagar Pawan and was also used by the aerobatic team Surya Kiran of the IAF up until February 2011, at which point the team was disbanded after its aircraft were diverted to train fighter pilots. The Surya Kiran display team has been reequipped with specially-equipped Hawks. During December 2018, a handful of Kirans were donated by India to Myanmar. The IAF plans to retire the aircraft by 2027.

== Development ==
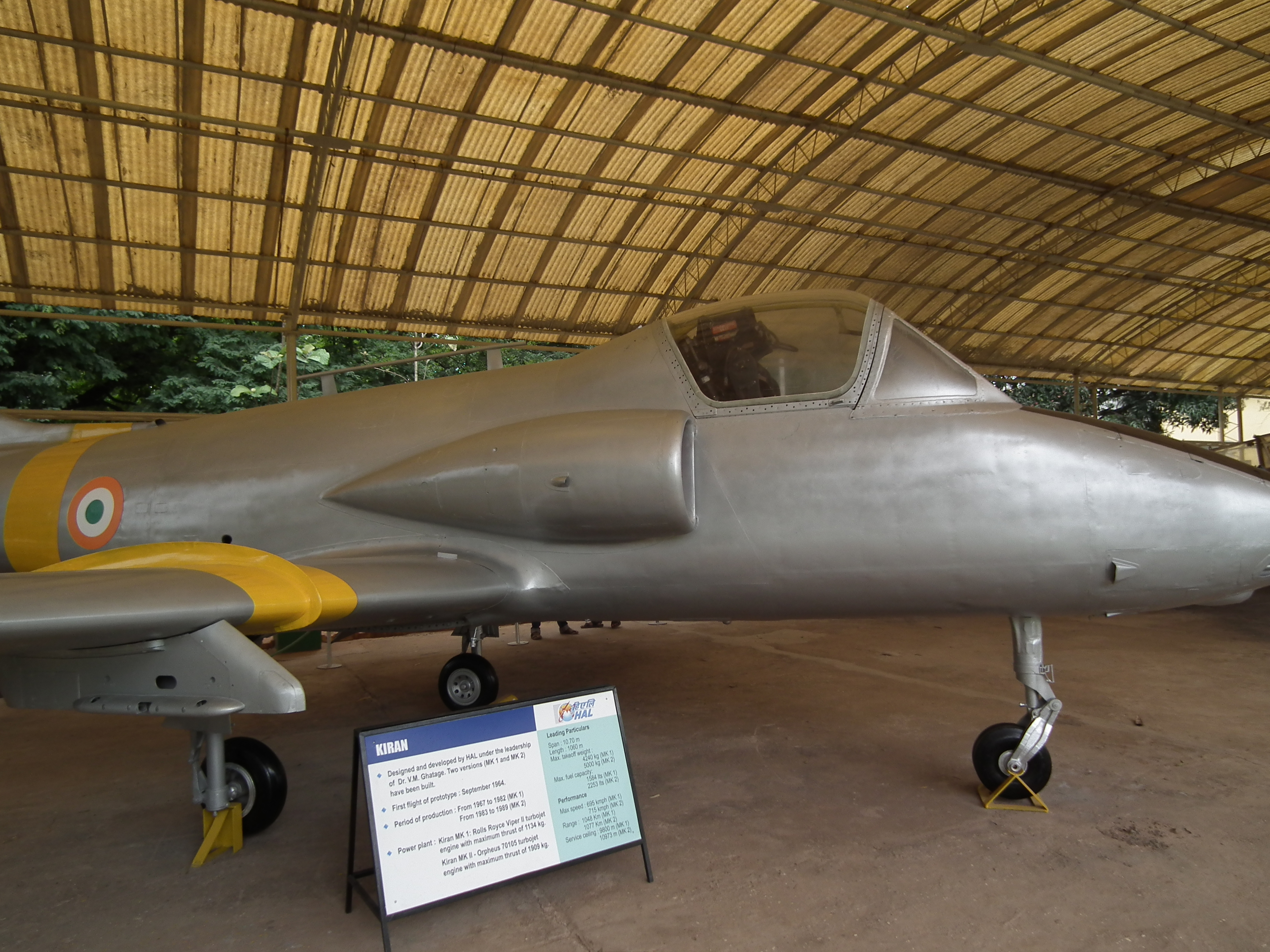
A Kiran II on static display at the HAL Museum, Bangalore, 2011

The Kiran was developed by Indian aircraft manufacturer Hindustan Aeronautics Limited (HAL) in response the issuing of an Indian Air Force (IAF) requirement that called for a new intermediate jet-powered trainer aircraft. HAL's design team devised a relatively conventional trainer; according to author Chris Smith, their design was closely modelled on the BAC Jet Provost, an existing British jet trainer. HAL chose to adopt the British-sourced Rolls-Royce Viper 11 turbojet engine, capable of generating up to 2,500 lbf (11,000 N) of thrust, to serve as its powerplant. According to Smith, the development of what would become Kiran proved beneficial to other HAL projects, the design team being later redeployed to the HF-24 Marut, an indigenously designed fighter-bomber.

On 4 September 1964, a prototype performed the type's maiden flight. The initial production aircraft was designated Kiran I; during March 1968, the first deliveries of the pre-production aircraft were made to the IAF. Proving satisfactory, full-scale production of the type was approved shortly thereafter. Later production aircraft were fitted with hard points underneath each wing, which were intended for weapon training purposes; this modification led to such aircraft being redesignated as Kiran IA. A total of 190 Mk I and 1A aircraft were manufactured.

During the 1970s, work was undertaken by HAL on an uprated version of the aircraft; it was instead powered by the Bristol Siddeley Orpheus turbojet engine, capable of generating a maximum thrust of 4,200 lbf (19,000 N). This variant, which was also furnished with an enhanced weapon-carrying capability, was designated Kiran Mk II. On 30 July 1976, this variant performed its first flight. Around this time, India was seeking a more advanced trainer aircraft in response to difficulties experienced with trainee pilots transitioning from the original Kiran to frontline fighter aircraft. Deliveries of the improved model commenced during 1985; production of the Kiran was terminated during 1989.

== Operational history ==
Since the initial aircraft first being delivered in 1968, the Kiran has been operated by both the IAF and the Indian Navy for the intermediate elements of their training syllabuses. Since the late 1990s, HAL has been working on developing a successor to the Kiran, which has been designated HJT-36 Sitara. Its development has been protracted, being troubled by accidents during the test flight phase and having to perform an extensive redesign. Another jet trainer, the British-designed BAE Systems Hawk, has been license-manufactured by HAL to supplement and gradually replace the IAF's aging Kiran fleet since 2007. While deliveries of the Hawk and development of the Sitara continues, the operating life of the Kiran has been extended through to 2019, over 50 years after the first examples being delivered to the IAF.

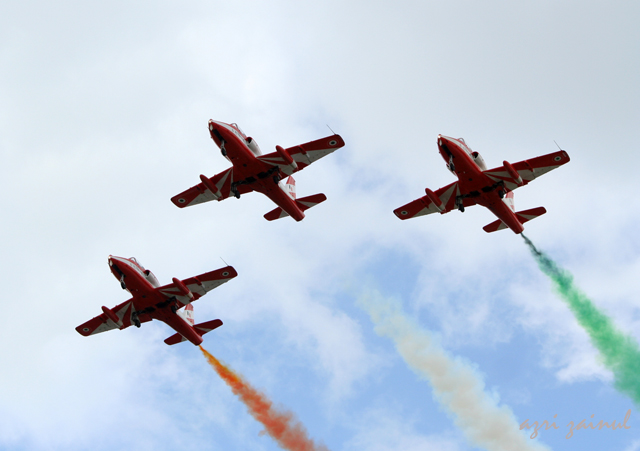
Aircraft of the Surya Kiran display team in formation flight during LIMA 2007

Following the grounding of the HAL HPT-32 Deepak fleet in 2009 amid safety concerns, the Kiran was temporarily used to perform both Stage I & II of fighter pilot training; this change was accompanied by considerable disruption, including a reduction of available flying hours to students as well as necessitating the redistribution of aircraft from the Surya Kiran display team. During 2010, an urgent request for proposals was issued, seeking a rapid replacement for the HPT-32 and to enable the Kiran fleet to resume normal operations; the Pilatus PC-7 was subsequently selected for this role.

Both the Indian Naval Air Arm and the Indian Air Force have independently operated their own aerobatic display teams, Sagar Pawan and Surya Kiran respectively. On 3 March 2010, a Kiran Mk II of the Sagar Pawan aerobatic team crashed into a building in Hyderabad during the Indian Aviation 2010 air show, killing both crewmembers and injuring four civilians on the ground. During the 2010s, the Indian Defence Ministry placed an order for 20 Hawk Mk132 aircraft with HAL to replace the remaining Kirans assigned to the Surya Kiran display team. By 2019, several Hawks had been issued to the Surya Kiran display team and had been used to perform its trademark aerial displays.

During December 2018, India donated six Kirans to neighbouring Myanmar, these aircraft were dispatched along with a team of specialists to train both pilots and ground crew in their operation. Publication Times Now has speculated that this gift was an intentional politically-charged decision, intended to strengthen military ties between the two countries as well as to a means to counterbalancing the growing influence of China over the region.

To aid in the development of the HAL CATS project, a Kiran mk.ii was converted into an optionally uncrewed aircraft named OMCA, further conversions are expected as the plane will be phased out of service.

== Variants ==
Kiran Mk I
Two-seat intermediate jet trainer powered by a Rolls-Royce Viper turbo-jet engine. 118 built.
Kiran Mk IA
Two-seat intermediate jet trainer with armament capability. Two underwing hardpoints fitted. 72 built.
Kiran Mk II
Improved version with four hardpoints and integral twin 7.62 mm machine guns in nose and a Bristol Siddeley Orpheus engine. 61 built.

== Operators ==
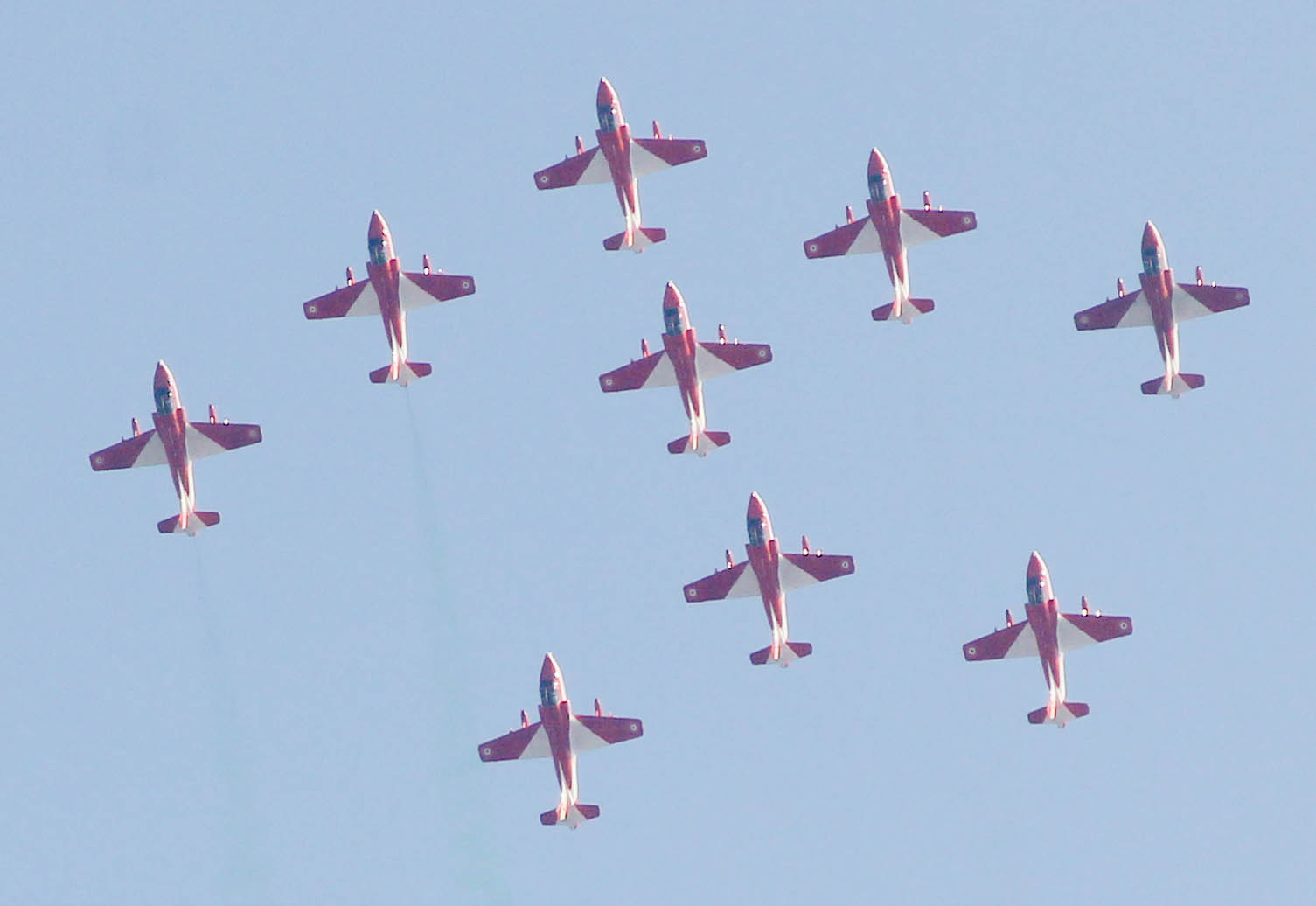
Formation of Kirans in flight

India

- Indian Air Force: 87
- Indian Navy: 20

Myanmar

- Myanmar Air Force: 6

== Specification (Kiran IA) ==
Data from Jane's All The World's Aircraft 1982–83

General characteristics

- Crew: 2
- Length: 10.60 m (34 ft 9 in)
- Wingspan: 10.70 m (35 ft 1 in)
- Height: 3.64 m (11 ft 11 in)
- Wing area: 19.00 m^{2} (204.5 sq ft)
- Aspect ratio: 6.03:1
- Airfoil: NACA 23015 at root, NACA 23012 at tip
- Empty weight: 2,560 kg (5,644 lb)
- Max takeoff weight: 4,235 kg (9,337 lb)
- Fuel capacity: 1,137 L (300 US gal; 250 imp gal) internal fuel
- Powerplant: 1 × Rolls-Royce Viper 11 turbojet, 11.12 kN (2,500 lbf) thrust

Performance

- Maximum speed: 695 km/h (432 mph, 375 kn) at sea level
- Cruise speed: 324 km/h (201 mph, 175 kn)
- Stall speed: 137–145 km/h (85–90 mph, 74–78 kn) flaps extended and landing gear deployed
- Endurance: 1 hr 45 min
- Service ceiling: 9,150 m (30,020 ft)
- Time to altitude: 20 min to 9,150 m (30,000 ft)

Armament

- two 500lb (227kg) bombs or two SNEB rocket pods containing seven 68 mm rockets or two pods with 7.62 mm machine guns, or two 50-Imp Gal (226 litre) drop tanks

== See also ==
Aircraft of comparable role, configuration, and era

- BAC Jet Provost
- Cessna T-37 Tweet
- Canadair CT-114 Tutor
- Fouga CM.170 Magister
- Saab 105
