= List of Indian military radars =

The Indian Armed Forces uses various types of radars.

== Airspace surveillance radar ==
Name	Type	Designer	Manufacturer	Dim	Freq	Range	Alt	User	Intr.	Qty	Status	Image	Notes	Ref.
THD-1955	High Power Static Radar	(France) Thomson-CSF	Bharat Electronics	3D		430 km (230 nmi)	23 km (75,000 ft)	Indian Air Force	1976	12	In service		First operationalised at Jodhpur AFS by 33 Signal Unit.	
PSM-33	Medium Power	(France) Thomson-CSF (India) Bharat Electronics	Bharat Electronics			260 km (140 nmi)		Indian Air Force	1983		In service		First operationalised at Naraina	
TRS-2215	Medium Power	(France) Thomson-CSF (India) Bharat Electronics	Bharat Electronics		S		4,000 m (13,000 ft)	Indian Air Force			In service			
INDRA I	Pulse-doppler Medium-range	(India) DRDO	Bharat Electronics	2D	L			Indian Army	N/A	6	In service		Incorporated IFF Mk X	
INDRA II	Pulse-doppler Medium-range	(India) DRDO	Bharat Electronics	2D	L			Indian Air Force	1999	69	In service		Can track up to 200 targets	
Reporter	Tactical control radar	(Netherlands) Signaal (India) Bharat Electronics	Bharat Electronics		X	40 km (25 mi)	15–4,000 m (49–13,123 ft)	Indian Army	N/A	N/A	In service			
ATCR-33S	Airport surveillance radar	(Italy) Leonardo S.p.A. (India) Bharat Electronics	Bharat Electronics	3D	S	130 km (81 mi)		Indian Air Force	2003	46	In service		Procured in batches in 2003, 2007 and 2017 and deployed across sectors in multiple air bases.	
Rohini	Medium-range primary surveillance	(India) DRDO	Bharat Electronics	3D	S	150 km (93 mi)	15 km (49,000 ft)	Indian Air Force	2008	~45	In service		Based on 3D Central Acquisition Radar. Also acts as surveillance radar for Akash Weapon System (Squadron or Group-level)	
3D Tactical Control Radar	Medium-range primary surveillance	(India) DRDO	Bharat Electronics	3D	S	90 km (56 mi)	15 km (49,000 ft)	Indian Air Force	2015	6+	In service		Based on 3D Central Acquisition Radar. Also acts as surveillance radar for Akash Weapon System (Squadron or Group-level)	
Ground Smarter 100	GaN-based AESA Multifunction radar	(France) Thales Group	Thales (6) Bharat Electronics (13)		S	180 km (110 mi)		Indian Air Force	2014	19	In service			
EL/M-2084	AESA Multifunction radar	Israel Aerospace Industries	ELTA Systems	3D	C			Indian Army Indian Air Force	2021		In service		Paired with SPYDER and MRSAM missile syetsms.	
Nebo-UM	Anti-stealth radar	(Russia) Nizhny Novgorod Research Institute of Radio Engineering	Almaz-Antey Corporation	3D	VHF	600 km (370 mi)		Indian Air Force	N/A		In service			
Surya	Anti-stealth radar	(India) DRDO	Alpha Design Technologies		VHF	360 km (220 mi)		Indian Air Force	2025	1	In service		6 on order.	
Arudhra	Medium Power, AESA radar	(India) DRDO	Bharat Electronics	4D	S	Instr–400 km (250 mi) Det–300 km (190 mi)	100 m (330 ft) to 30 km (98,000 ft)	Indian Air Force			On order		Offers 360° coverage in rotating mode with option for staring mode. Replaces PSM-33, P-40 and TRS-2215 radars. 16 ordered.	
Ashwini Low-Level Transportable Radar (LLTR)	AESA Multifunction radar	(India) DRDO	Bharat Electronics	4D	S	Instr–200 km (120 mi) Det–150 km (93 mi)	30 m (98 ft) to 15 km (49,000 ft)	Indian Air Force			On order		Used for early-warning and airspace surveillance roles.	
DRDO-L&T High Power Radar	High Power Static Radar	(India) DRDO	Larsen & Toubro	4D	N/A	>400 km (250 mi)	N/A	Indian Air Force			On order		12 ordered.	
Battery Surveillance Radar (BSR)	Primary surveillance AESA radar	(India) DRDO	Bharat Electronics		X	120 km (75 mi)	30 m (98 ft) to 6 km (20,000 ft)	Indian Army			Cleared for induction		Battery level surveillance radar for QRSAM Weapon System.	
Air Defence Tactical Control Radar (ADTCR)	Volumetric surveillance	(India) DRDO			S	90 km (56 mi)	10 km (33,000 ft)	Indian Army			Under development		Army variant of Ashwini radar. Replacement for INDRA and P-19 radars. Ready for user trials.	

== Fire-control radar ==
Name	Type	Designer	Manufacturer	Dim	Frequency	Range	Alt	User	Intr.	Qty	Status	Image	Guidance	Notes	Ref.
Upgraded Super Fledermaus		(Sweden) Ericsson Radar Electronics	Bharat Electronics		Doppler radar: E/F; Pulse-doppler radar: J	90 km (56 mi)		Indian Army	2000s	N/A	In service		L/60 and L/70 anti-aircraft guns	Original units, with a range of 15 km (9.3 mi), were procured in early 1980s	
Flycatcher		(Netherlands) Signaal	Bharat Electronics		Search: I/J band; Track: K band	20 km (12 mi)		Indian Army	1985	260	In service		L/60, L/70 anti-aircraft guns and Trishul SAM		
Atulya ADFCR		(India) DRDO	Bharat Electronics		X (AESA 3D search radar); Ka (tracking radar); EO (passive 2D tracking sensors); LRF (radar-independent ranging)	20–40 km (12–25 mi)	10–30 km (33,000–98,000 ft)	Indian Army		66	On order		L/70 anti-aircraft guns		
Mountain Fire Control Radar		Bharat Electronics	Bharat Electronics		X (AESA 3D search radar); Ka (tracking radar); EO (passive 2D tracking sensors); LRF (radar-independent ranging)	25 km (16 mi)					Under development		2 L/70 anti-aircraft guns and VSHORAD missile	Also called ADFCR Light. Developed by BEL's Defence & Aeronautics division	
Rajendra	Passive phased array radar	(India) DRDO	Bharat Electronics	3D	Search: G/H band; Track: I/J band	80 km (50 mi)	20 km (66,000 ft)	Indian Army Indian Air Force	2015	~28	In service		Akash Weapon System (Battery)	Airspace surveillance-capable. Known as Troop Level Radar (TLR) in IA and Flight Level Radar (FLR) in IAF.	
Battery Multi-Function Radar (BMFR)	Multifunction AESA radar	(India) DRDO	Bharat Electronics		X	90 km (56 mi)	30 m (98 ft) to 6 km (20,000 ft)	Indian Army			Cleared for induction		QRSAM Weapon System (Launcher Unit level)	Provides mid-course two-wat data link guidance to missiles on the move. It also features Radio Communication and Satellite communication while moving.	

== Counter-battery radar ==
Name	Designer	Manufacturer	Freq	Range	Alt	Azimuth	User	Intr.	Qty	Status	Image	Notes	Ref.
AN/TPQ-37 Firefinder	(United States) Hughes Aircraft Company	Hughes Aircraft Company	S	50 km (31 mi)		±45°	Indian Army		12	In service			
Swathi Weapon Locating Radar	(India) DRDO	Bharat Electronics	C	48 km (30 mi)	4,900 m (16,100 ft)	±45°	Indian Army	1985	49	In service		Derivative of Rajendra radar.	

== Anti-ballistic missile early-warning radar ==
Name	Designer	Manufacturer	Freq	Range	Alt	Azimuth	User	Intr.	Qty	Status	Image	Notes	Ref.
Swordfish Long Range Tracking Radar	(India) DRDO	Bharat Electronics	L	1,500 km (930 mi)	15 km (9.3 mi)	360°	Indian Army	2009	≥2	In service		Derivative of EL/M-2080 Green Pine	
VLRTR	(India) DRDO	Bharat Electronics	L	3,000 km (1,900 mi)	15 km (9.3 mi)	360°	Indian Army	2017	2	In service		Derivative of Swordfish Long Range Tracking Radar	

== Low-level/Man-portable radar ==
Name	Type	Designer	Manufacturer	Dim	Freq	Range	Alt	Azimuth	User	Intr.	Qty	Status	Image	Notes	Ref.
BEL Battle Field Surveillance Radar	Short range battle field surveillance radar	(India) DRDO	Bharat Electronics		J	Instr–18 km (11 mi) Det–14 km (8.7 mi)	4,900 m (16,100 ft)	±45°	Indian Army	2004	1400+	In service			
EL/M-2026B	Low-level lightweight radar	Israel Aerospace Industries	ELTA Systems		X	Instr–25 km (16 mi) Det–15 km (9.3 mi)			Indian Army	2010s	21				
Bharani Mk-I	Low-level lightweight radar	(India) DRDO	Bharat Electronics	2D	L	Instr–50 km (31 mi) Det–40 km (25 mi)	30–5,400 m (98–17,717 ft)	±45°	Indian Army		N/A	In service		Detects UAVs, helicopters and fixed wing aircraft at low to medium altitudes.	
Aslesha MkI	Low-level lightweight radar	(India) DRDO	Bharat Electronics	3D	S	Instr–50 km (31 mi)			Indian Air Force	2021		In service		Detects UAVs, helicopters and fixed wing aircraft. Weighs 250 kg (550 lb).	
Improved Low Level Light Weight Radar (LLLR-I)	Low-level lightweight radar	(India) DRDO	Bharat Electronics	3D	S	Instr–50 km (31 mi)			Indian Army			On order		An upgrade of Aslesha with four fixed phased-array panels.	
Aslesha MkII	Low Level Surveillance Radar	(India) Bharat Electronics	Bharat Electronics	3D	S	Instr–120 km (75 mi)	20 m (66 ft) to 120 km (390,000 ft)					Under development		Twin HMV-configuration (Sensor Vehicle and Power Supply Vehicle) with GaN-based semi-AESA radar.	

== Airborne radar ==
Name	Type	Designer	Freq	Range	User	Intr.	Qty	Status	Image	Platform	Notes	Ref.
Netra Mk 1	AEW&C	(India) DRDO		250–375 km (155–233 mi)	Indian Air Force	2017	3	In service		Embraer ERJ-145		
Uttam	GaAs-based AESA radar	(India) DRDO	X	>100 km (62 mi)				Under development		HAL Tejas (Planned); HAL Tejas Mk2 (Planned)		
Virupaaksha	GaN-based AESA radar	(India) DRDO	X	>400 km (250 mi)				Under development		Sukhoi Su-30MKI (Planned)	Based on Uttam radar	

== Naval platform-based radars ==
Name	Type	Designer	Manufacturer	Dim	Freq	Range	Alt	User	Intr.	Qty	Status	Image	Platform	Notes	Ref.
Revathi	Primary surveillance radar	(India) DRDO	Bharat Electronics	3D	S	185 km (115 mi)	18 km (59,000 ft)	Indian Navy	2007	6	In service		INS Rana (D52); INS Jalashwa (L41); Kamorta-class corvette	Based on 3D Central Acquisition Radar	
EL/M-2248 MF-STAR	Quad-panel multifunction AESA radar	Israel Aerospace Industries	ELTA Systems		S	>450 km (280 mi)		Indian Navy	2014	10	In service		Kolkata-class destroyer; Visakhapatnam-class destroyer; INS Vikrant; Nilgiri-class frigate	Based on EL/M-2084	

== See also ==
- List of active Indian military aircraft
- List of Indian military missiles
