= List of active Indian military aircraft =

Current aircraft of the Indian Armed Forces

Indian military aircraft
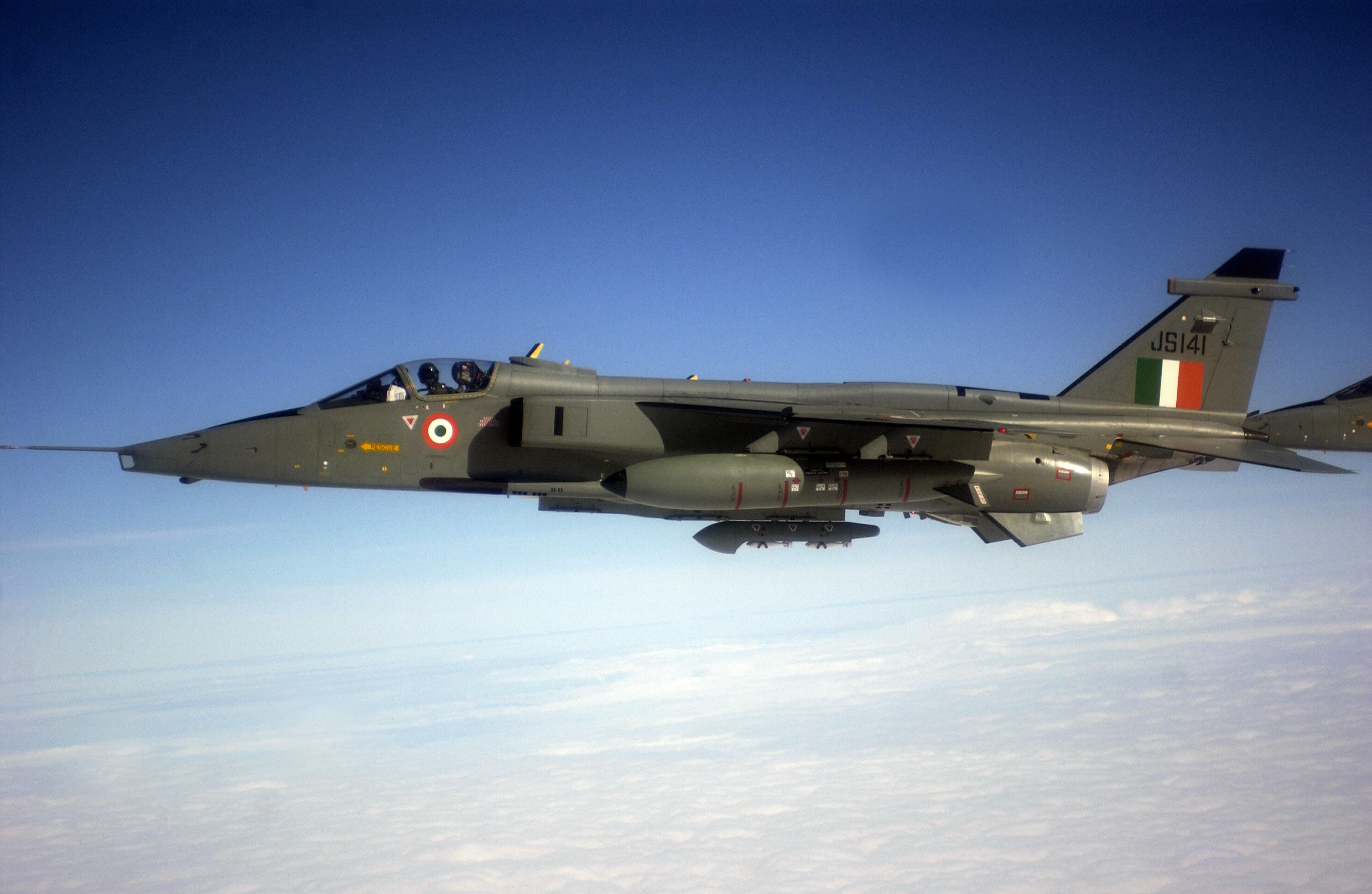
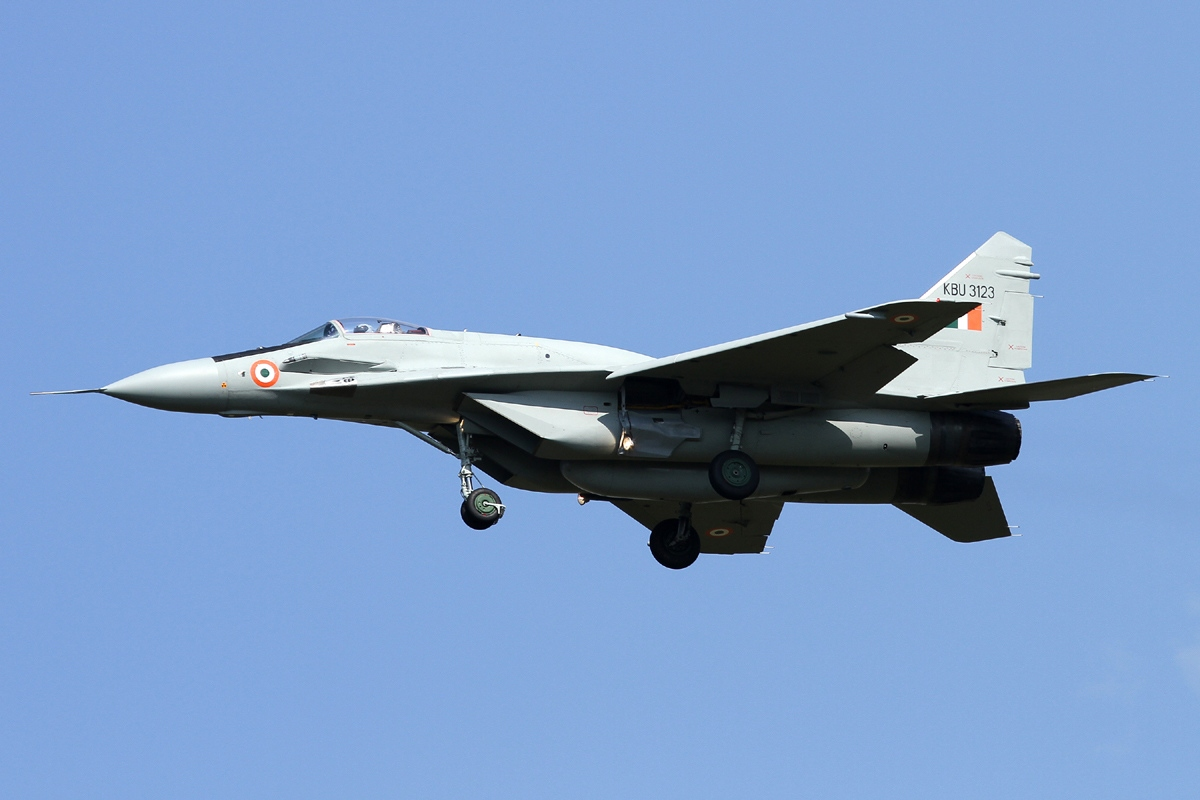
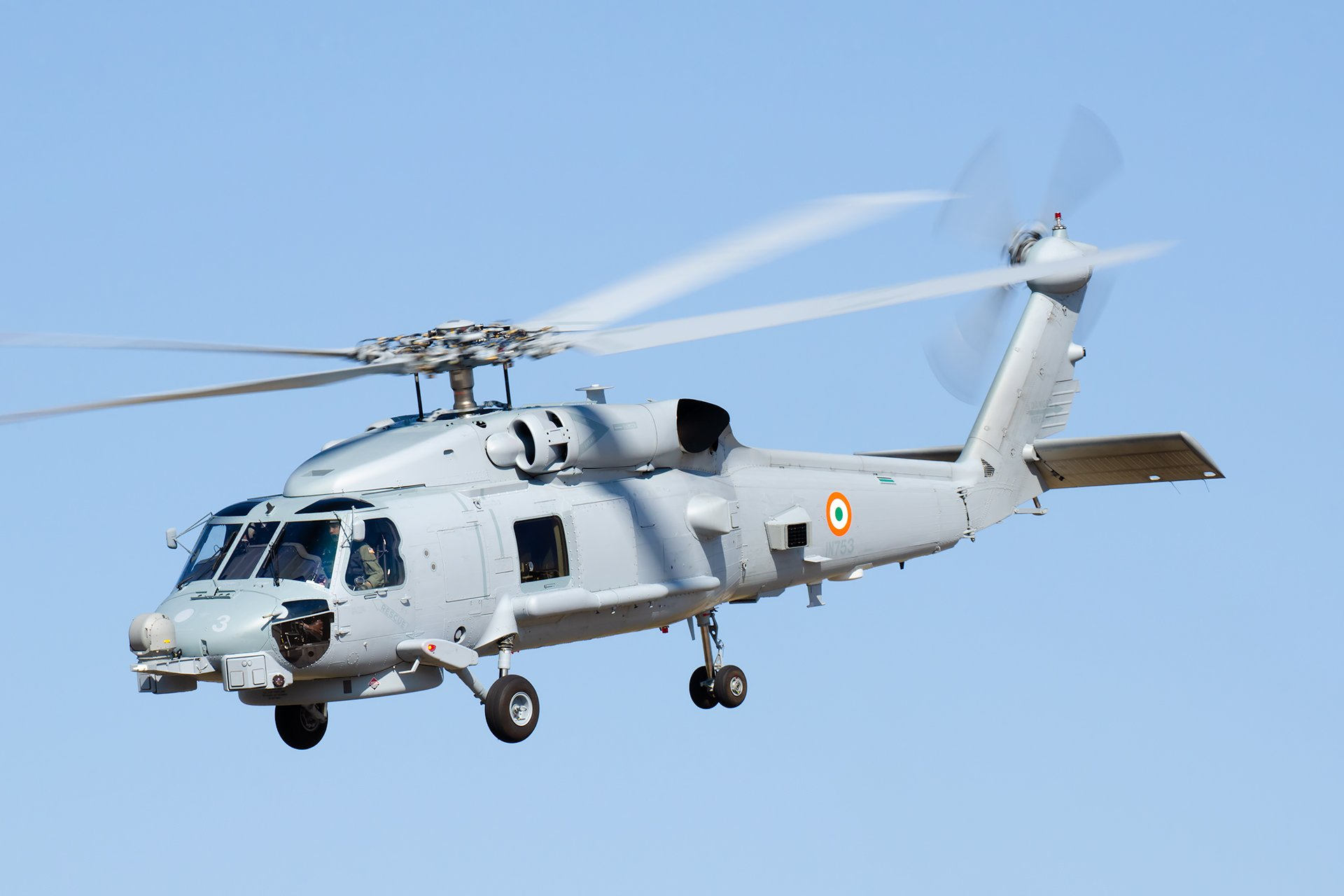
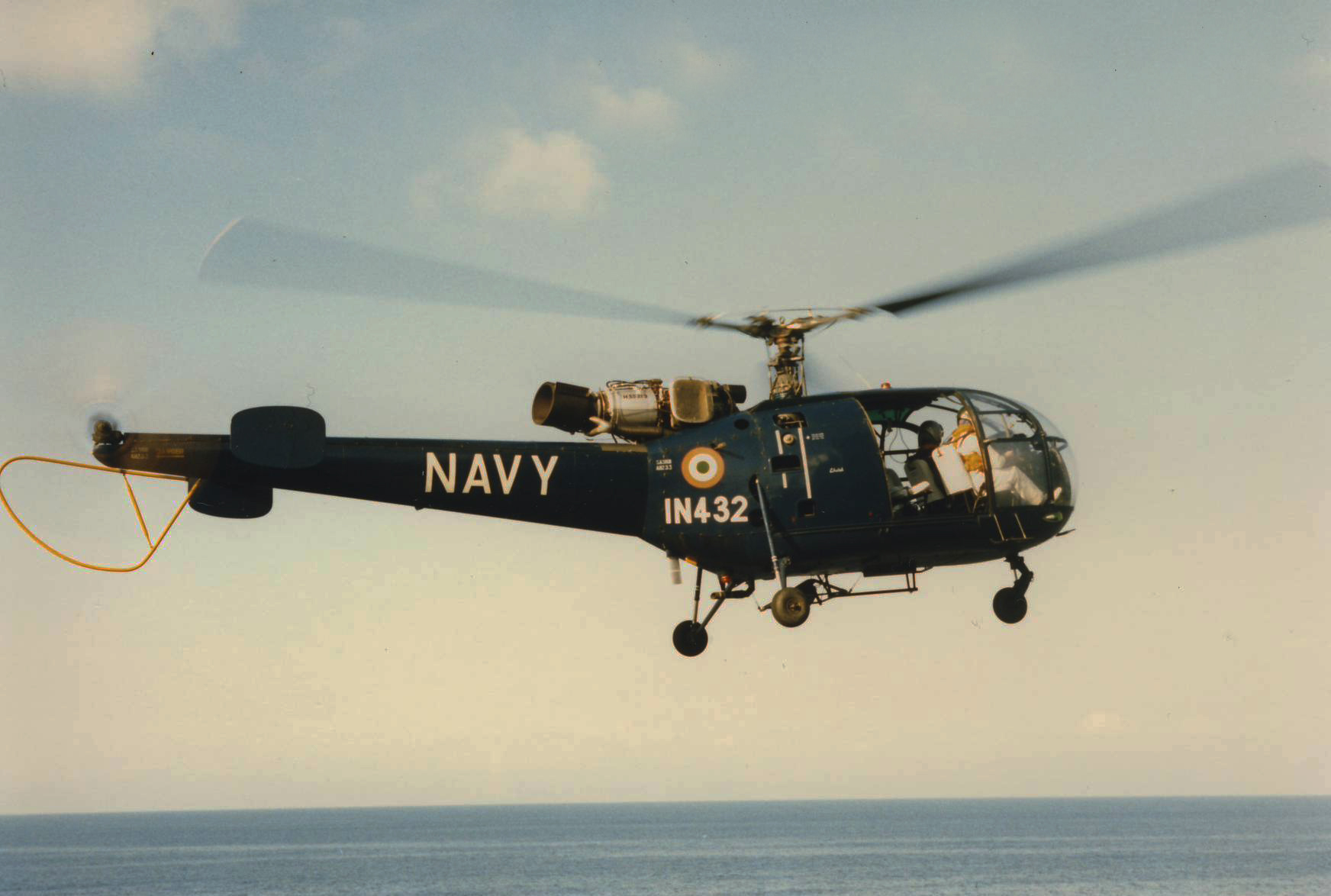
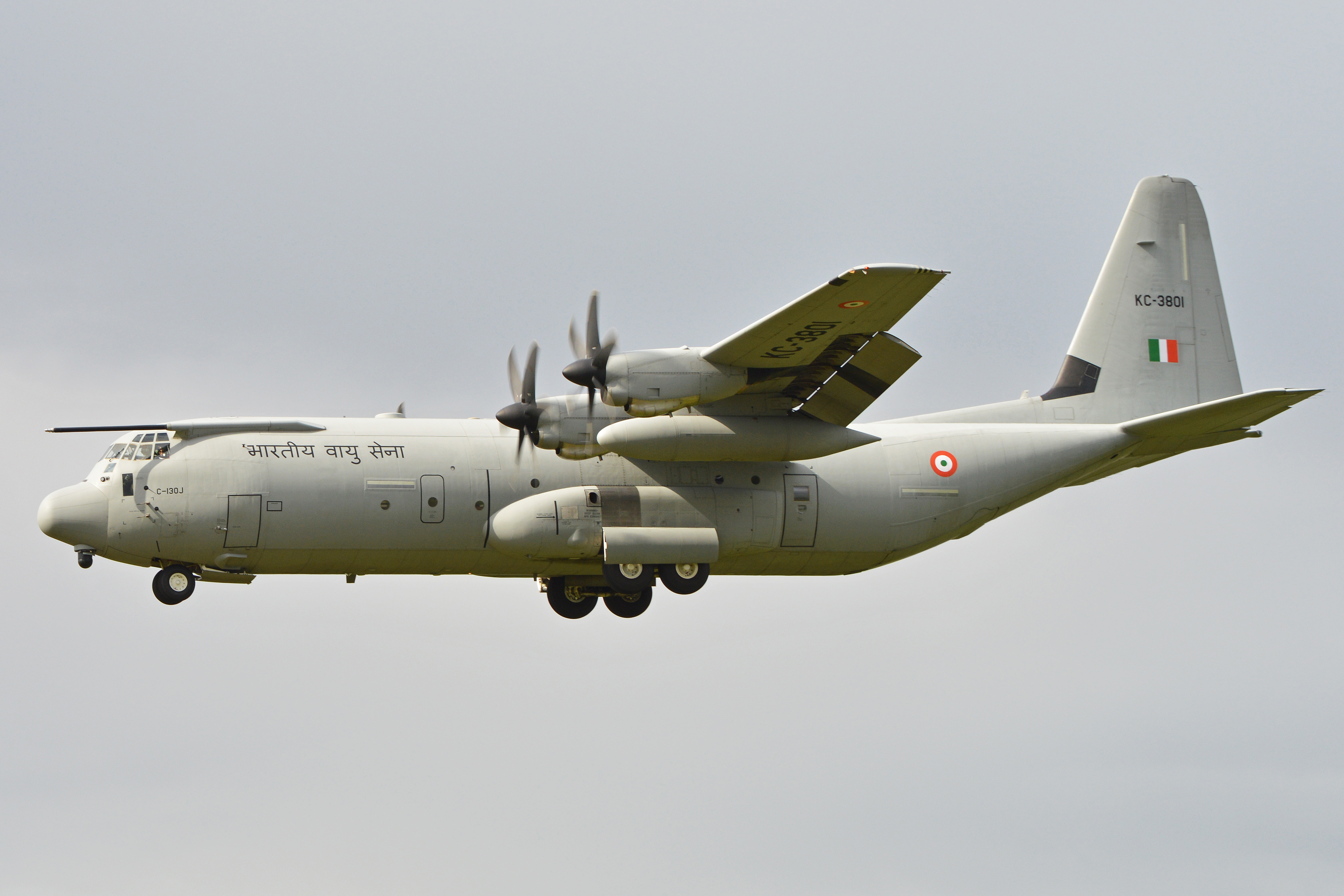
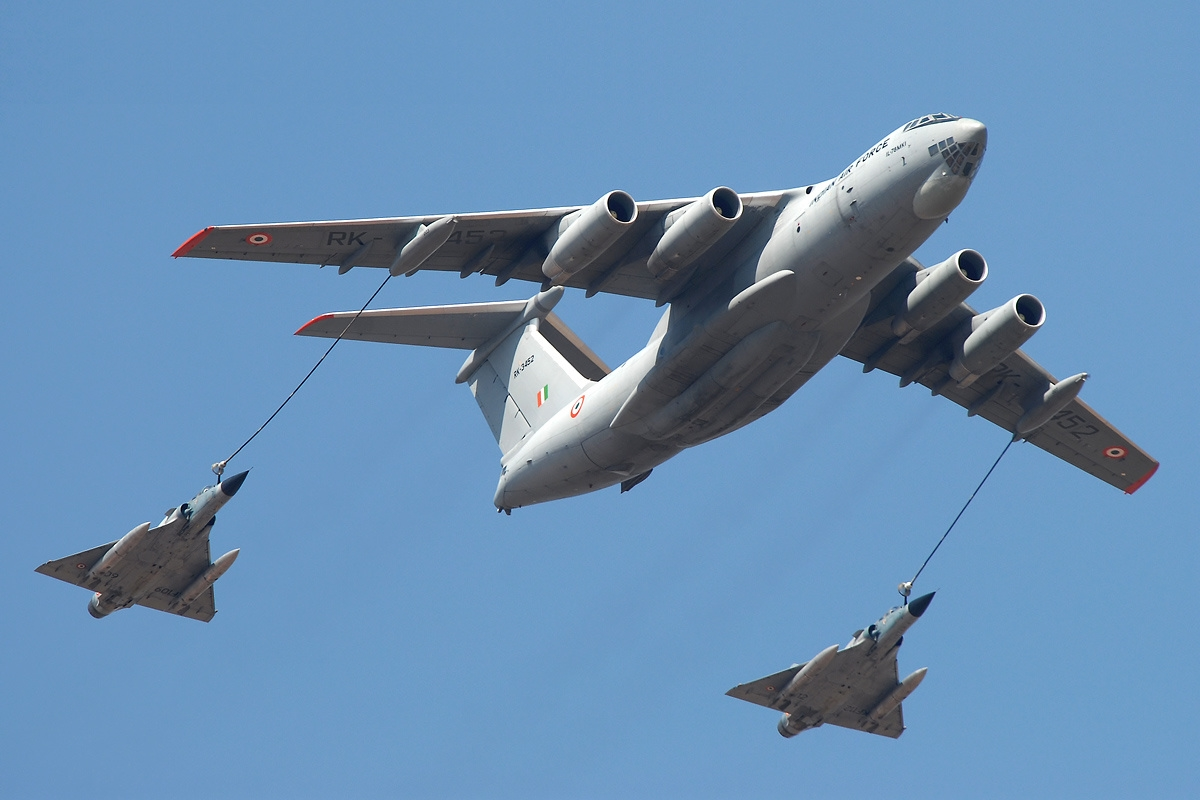
Various Indian military aircraft; Left to right:
1. SEPECAT Jaguar
2. Mikoyan MiG-29UPG
3. Sikorsky MH-60R Seahawk
4. HAL Chetak
5. Lockheed Martin C-130J Super Hercules
6. Ilyushin Il-78MKI with Dassault Mirage 2000s

The Indian Armed Forces consists of Indian Army, Indian Navy, and Indian Air Force. These three arms and the Indian Coast Guard operate a combination of combat, reconnaissance, tanker, and transport aircraft, helicopters, and unmanned aerial vehicles.

The Sukhoi Su-30MKI, assembled in India, forms the major inventory of the Indian combat aircraft. HAL Tejas, the indigenous fourth generation fighter aircraft, became part of the air force in 2015. Dassault Rafale is the latest entry into the air force, having been inducted in July 2020. Other combat aircraft include the Russian Mikoyan MiG-29, French Dassault Mirage, and British SEPECAT Jaguar aircraft. The armed forces operate a combination of various transport aircraft including tactical and strategic airlifters. Majority of this fleet is composed of the legacy Antonov An-32, Dornier 228, and Hawker Siddeley HS 748 aircraft. In the 2010s, the air force inducted large American air-lifters such as Boeing C-17 and Lockheed Martin C-130J into the fleet. In 2023, it started inducting Airbus C-295 transport aircraft to replace the older aircraft in its fleet.

The Indian helicopter fleet consists of the French Aérospatiale Alouette III and SA 315B Lama, which were license built in India. The Russian made Mil Mi-17 and Mi-24 forms the major complement of the helicopter fleet. Hindustan Aeronautics Limited has designed and built various helicopters locally for the usage of armed forces such as the HAL Dhruv, Prachand, and Rudra. Since the late 2020s, India has inducted American made Boeing AH-64 Apache and CH-47 Chinook into the fleet. The Indian fleet also consists of various other reconnaissance and trainer aircraft and unmanned aerial vehicles which include both local and imported planes.

== Air Force ==
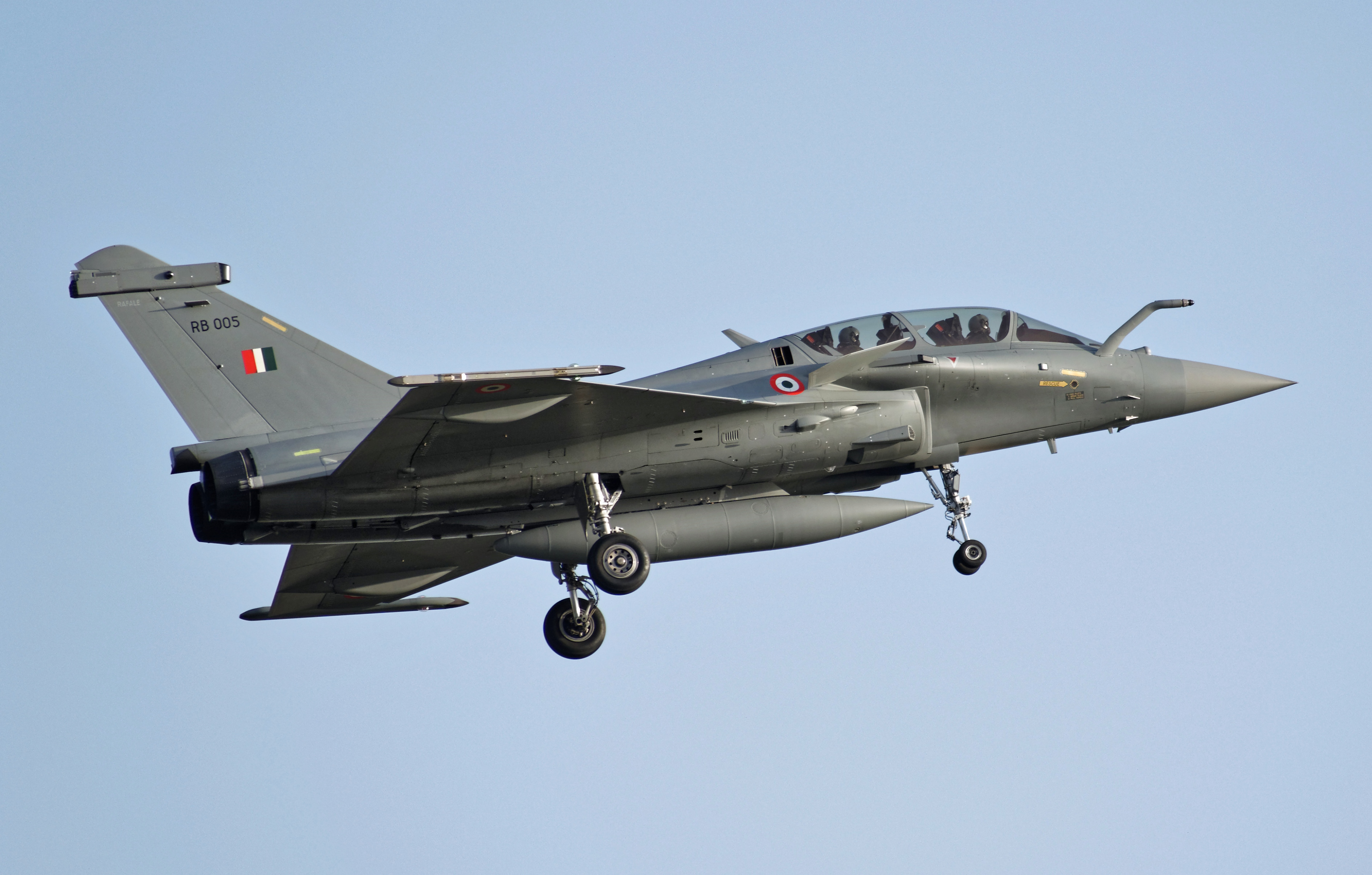
Dassault Rafale

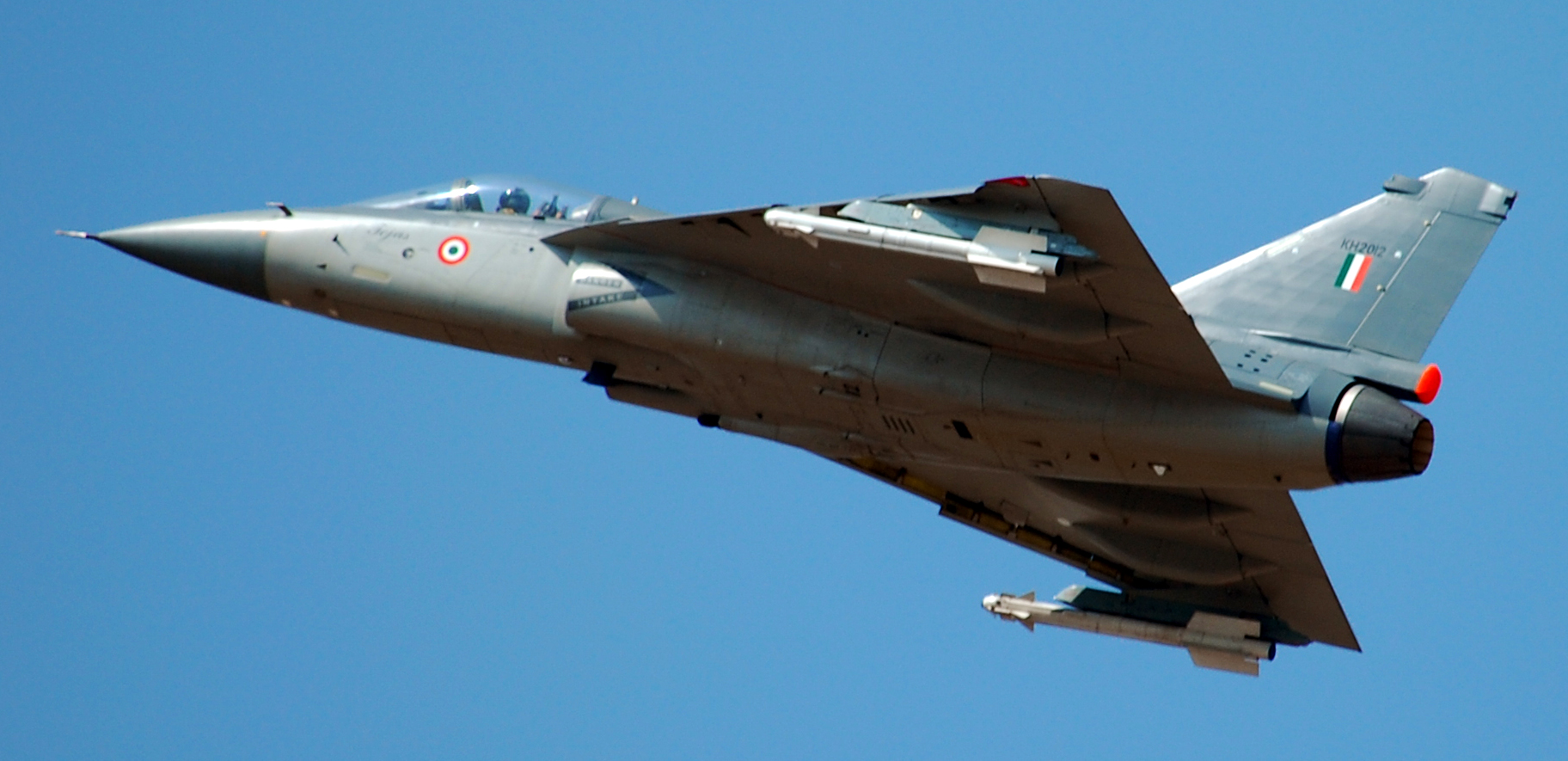
HAL Tejas

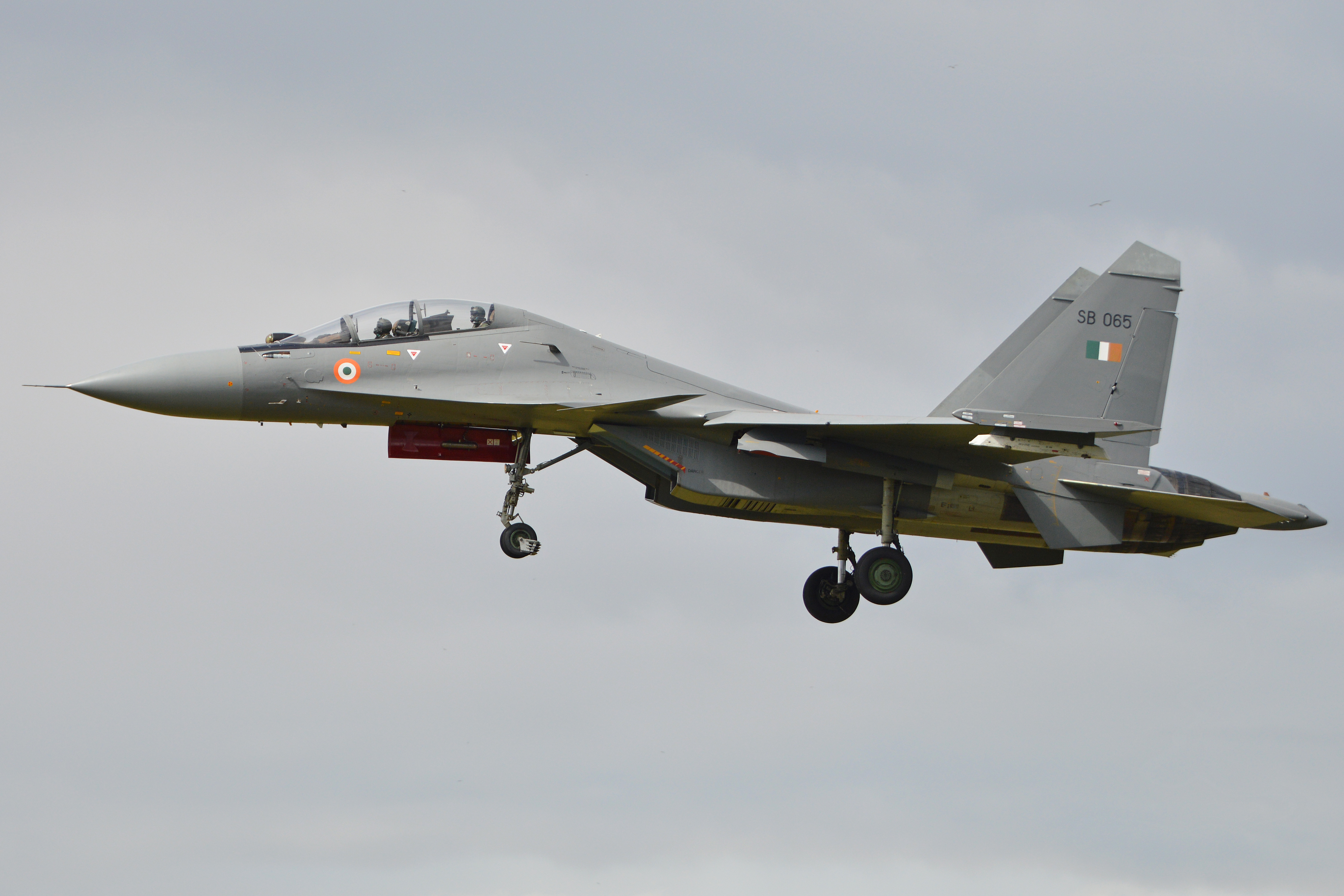
Sukhoi Su-30MKI

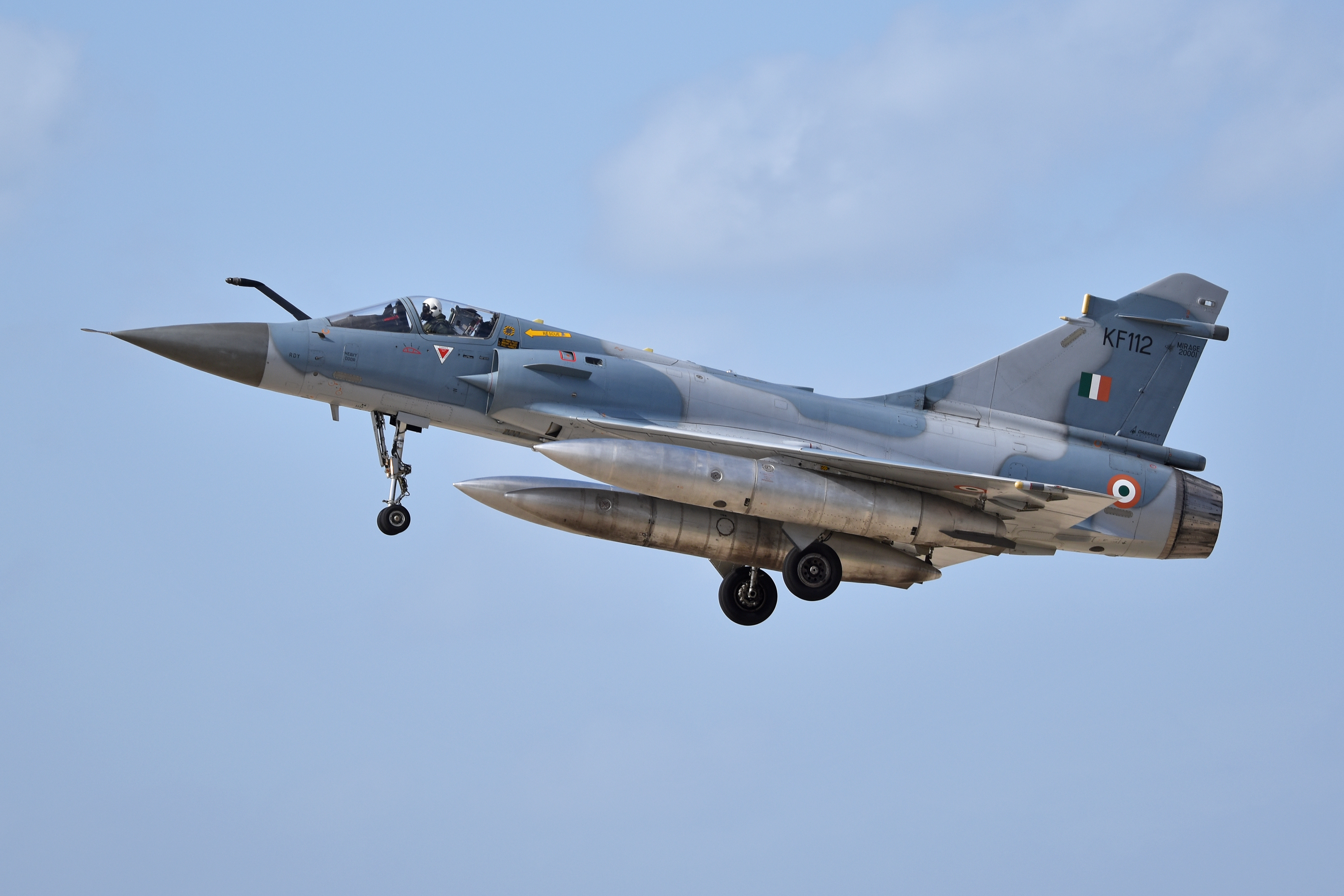
Dassault Mirage 2000I

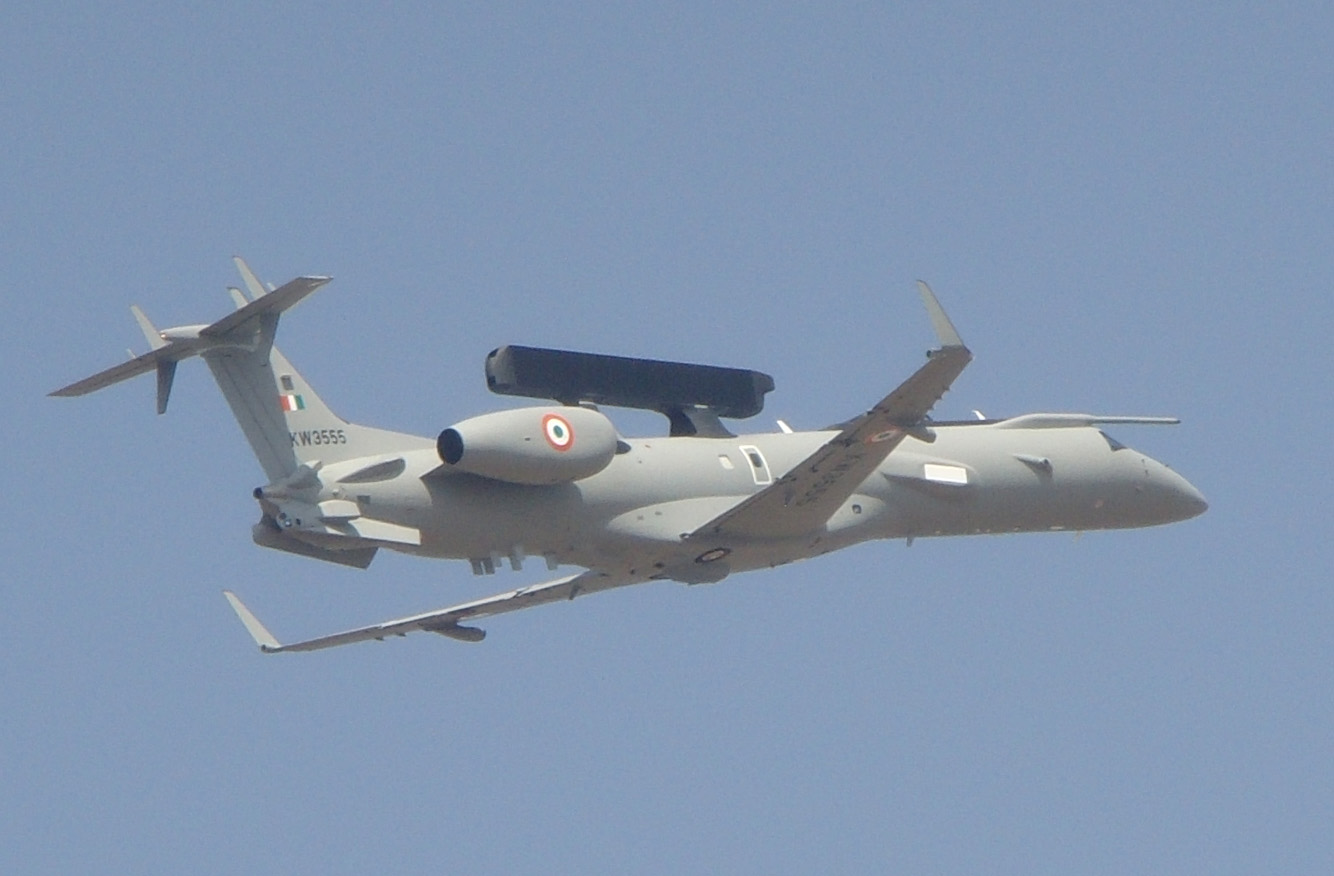
Netra AEW&C on Embraer EMB-145I

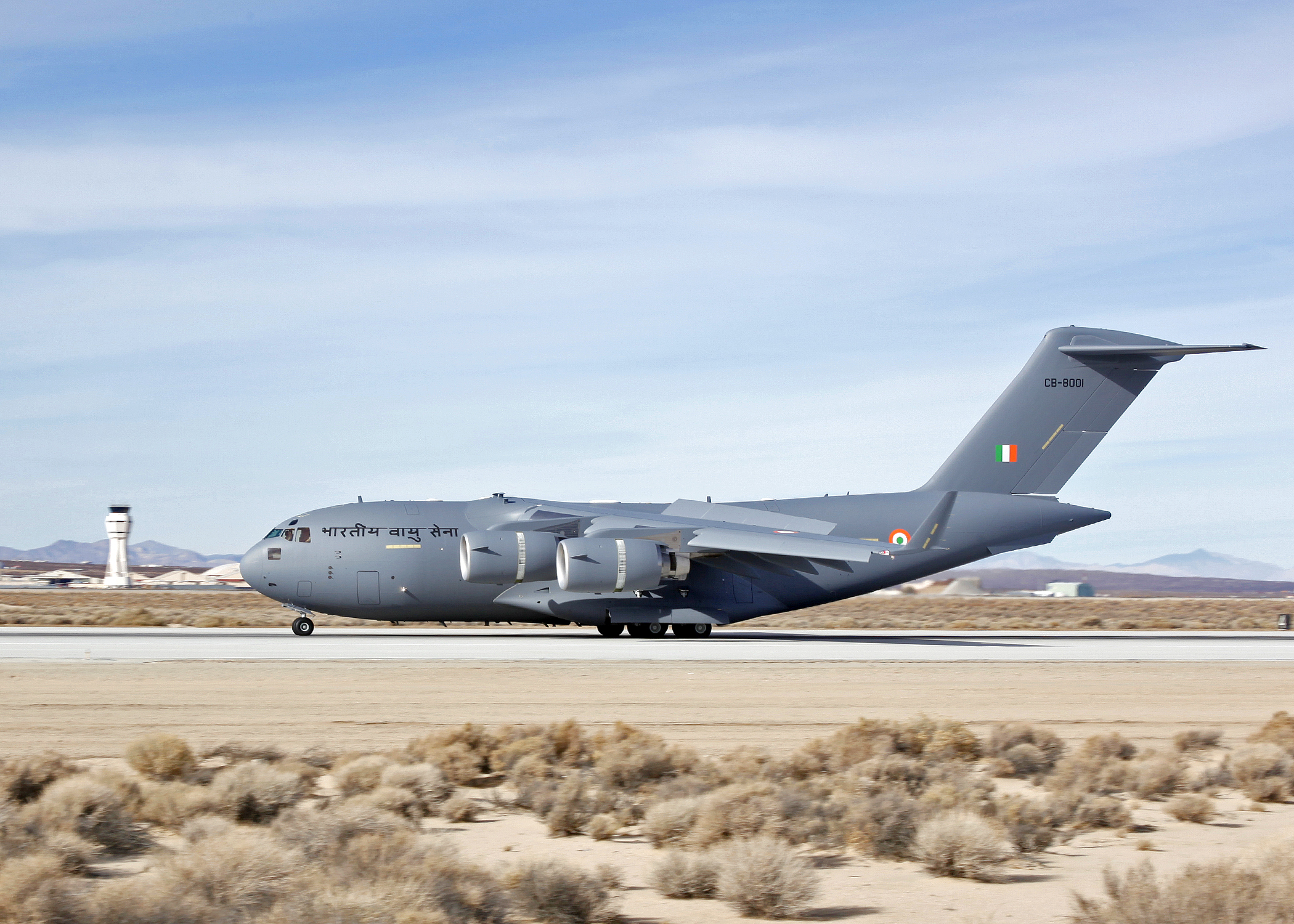
Boeing C-17 Globemaster III

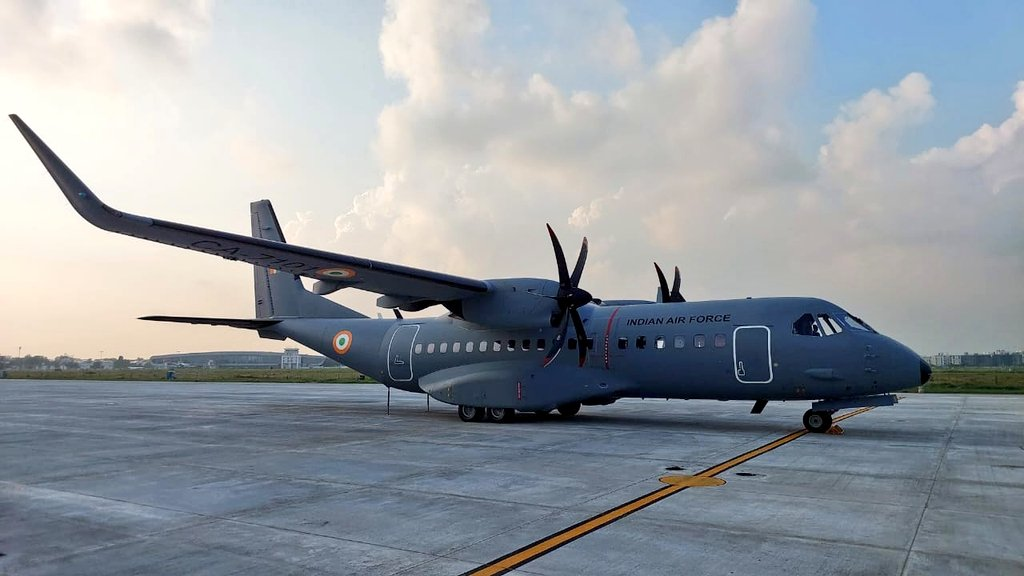
Airbus C-295

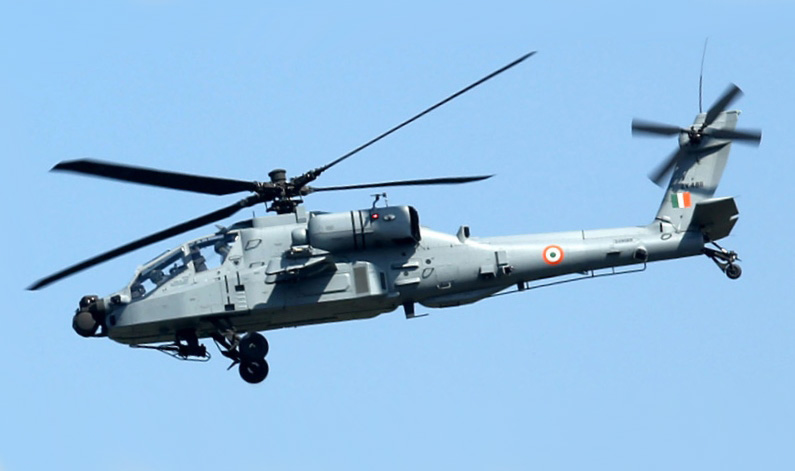
Boeing AH-64 Apache

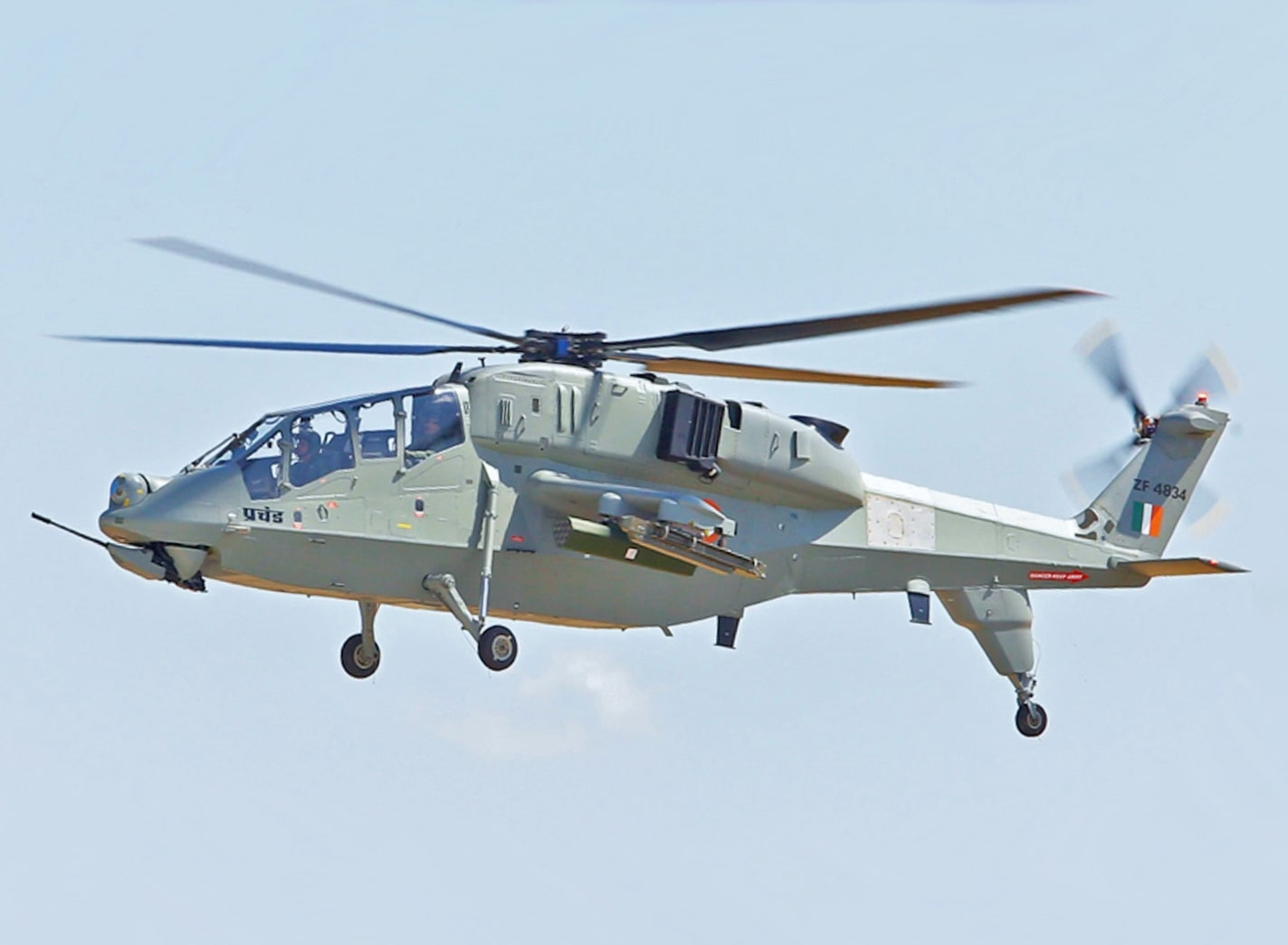
HAL Prachand

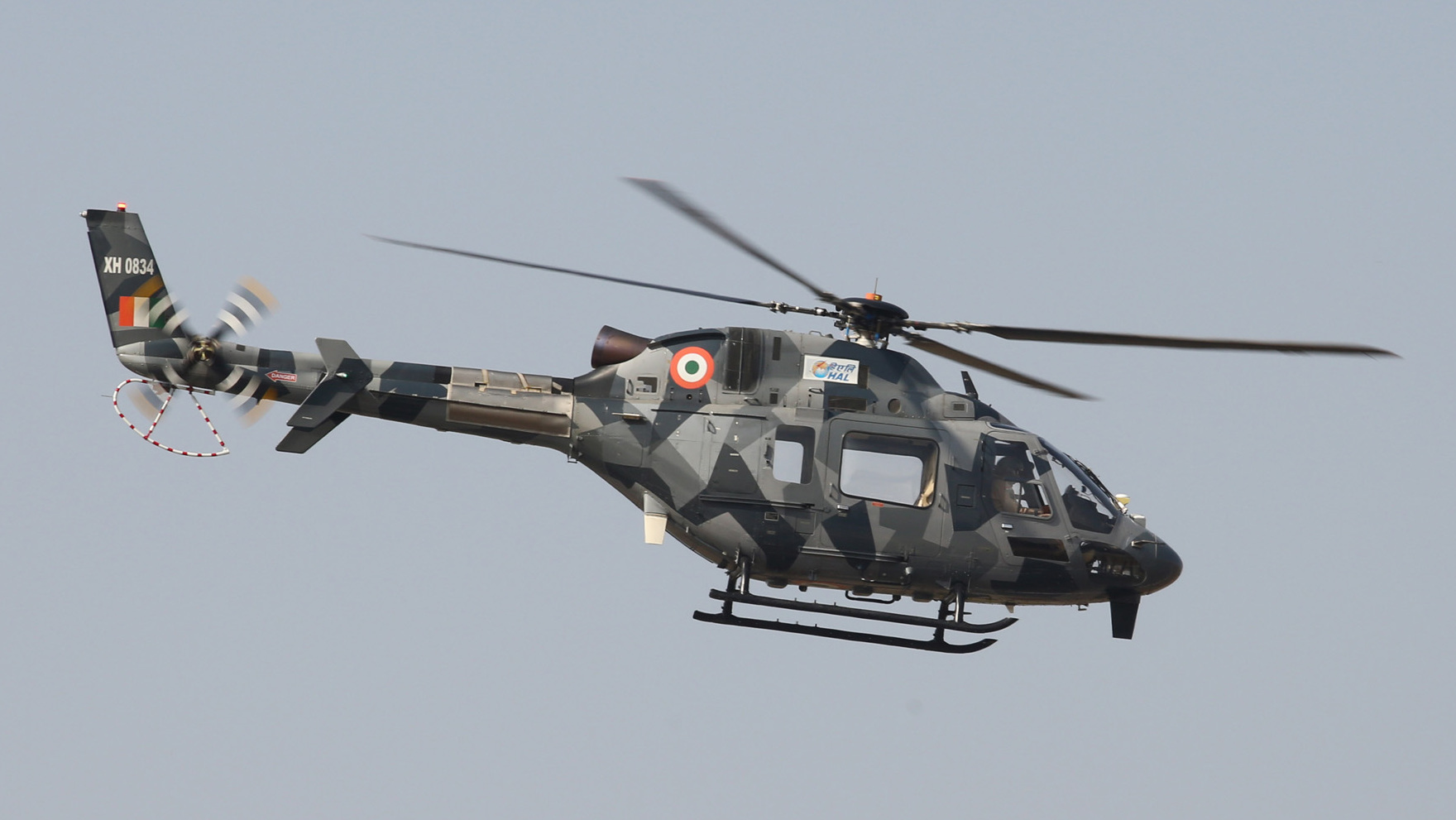
HAL LUH

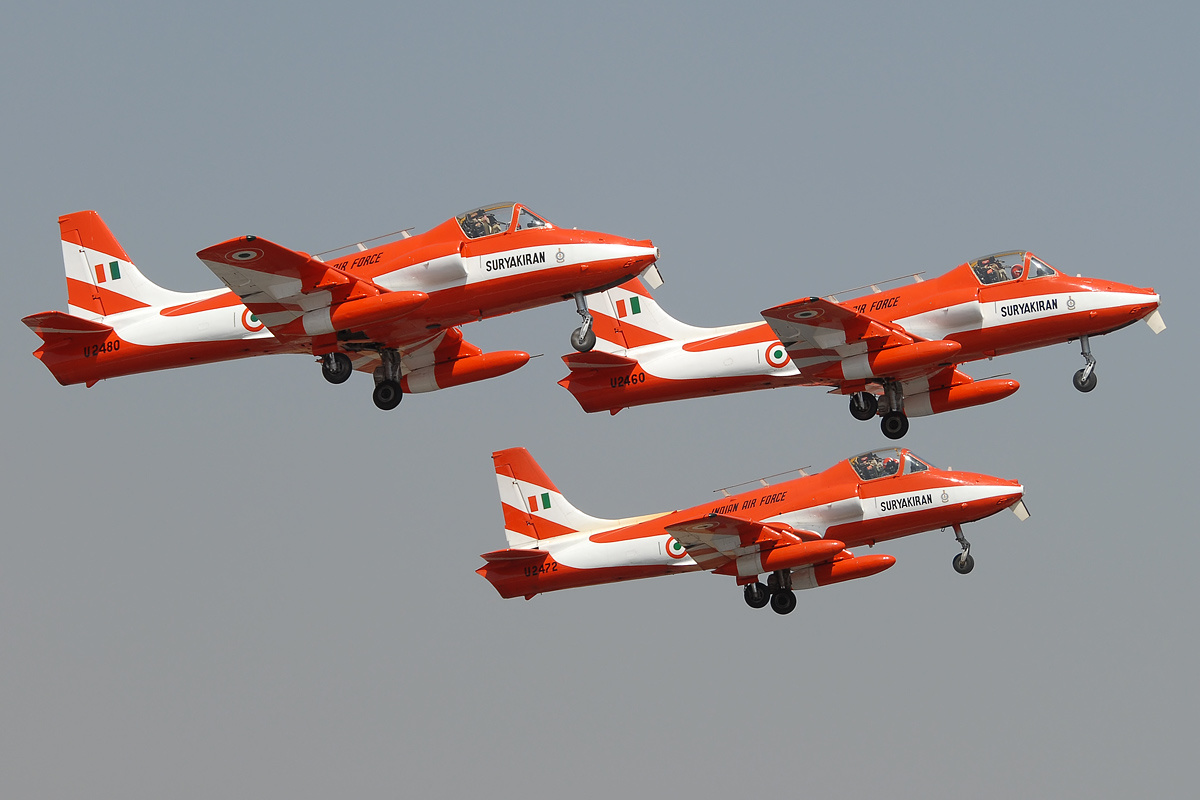
HAL Kiran

The Indian Air Force was established in 1932 as the Royal Indian Air Force of British India. The air force operates about 90 air squadrons including 29 equipped with fighter aircraft. The air force maintains a fleet of combat, patrol, and Military transport aircraft, various helicopters, and unmanned aerial vehicles across more than 60 air bases in the country.

Aircraft	Origin	Type	Variant	In service	Notes
Combat
Dassault Mirage 2000	France	Multirole	Mirage 2000H/I	36	All aircraft being upgraded to 2000I variant
Dassault Rafale	France	Multirole	Rafale EH	28	Single-seat version, 114 planned
Dassault Rafale	France	Multirole	Rafale DH	8	Two-seat version
HAL Tejas	India	Multirole	Tejas Mk 1	30	
HAL Tejas	India	Multirole	Tejas Mk 1A	–	141 on order
Mikoyan MiG-29	Soviet Union	Multirole	MiG-29B	40	
Mikoyan MiG-29	Soviet Union	Multirole	MiG-29UPG	12	Upgraded version of MiG-29B
Mikoyan MiG-29	Soviet Union	Multirole	MiG-29UB	7	Two-seat version
Sukhoi Su-30MKI	Russia / India (Note: License produced by Hindustan Aeronautics Limited)	Multirole	Su-30MKI	258	12 on order, 84 to be upgraded
SEPECAT Jaguar	United Kingdom / India	Attack	Jaguar-IM	8	Single-seat maritime strike version
SEPECAT Jaguar	United Kingdom / India	Attack	Jaguar-IS	78	Single-seat ground attack version
Fighter trainers
Dassault Mirage 2000	France	Conversion trainer	Mirage 2000TH/TI	10	All aircraft being upgraded to 2000TI variant
HAL Tejas	India	Lead-in fighter trainer / conversion trainer	Tejas Mk 1 Trainer	8	10 on order
HAL Tejas	India	Lead-in fighter trainer / conversion trainer	Tejas Mk 1A Trainer	–	29 on order
SEPECAT Jaguar	United Kingdom / India	Conversion trainer	Jaguar-IB	26	Two-seat training version
AEW&C
Beriev A-50	Soviet Union	AEW&C	A-50EI	3	
Embraer EMB-145I	Brazil / India (Note: To be fitted with AEW&CS by DRDO)	AEW&C	Netra Mk1/Mk1A	3	6 planned
Airbus A321	Europe / India	AEW&C	Netra Mk2	–	6 ex-Air India aircraft, to be modified
Reconnaissance
Bombardier Global 5000	Canada / Israel	ELINT	Global 5000	2	Operated by Aviation Research Centre of R&AW
Boeing 707	United States	Reconnaissance	707-337C	1	Operated by Aviation Research Centre of R&AW
Boeing 737	United States	Reconnaissance	737-700	2	Operated by Aviation Research Centre of R&AW
Gulfstream III	United States	Reconnaissance	III SRA	3	Operated by Aviation Research Centre of R&AW
Gulfstream G100	Israel	Reconnaissance	1125 Astra	2	Operated by Aviation Research Centre of R&AW
Tanker
Airbus A330 MRTT	France	Tanker/transport	A330 MRTT	–	One to be wet leased from French Air Force, 6 planned
Boeing KC-135	United States	Tanker	KC-135R	1	Wet leased from Metrea
Ilyushin Il-78	Soviet Union	Tanker	Il-78MKI	6	
Transport
Airbus A321	Europe	Transport	A321-200	4	
Boeing 777	United States	Transport	777-300ER	2	Used as Air India One
Embraer Legacy 600	Brazil	VIP transport	Legacy 6000	4	
Airbus C-295	Europe / India (Note: To be manufactured by Tata Advanced Systems)	Tactical airlifter	C-295W	16	40 on order
Antonov An-32	Soviet Union	Tactical airlifter	An-32RE	55	
Antonov An-32	Soviet Union	Tactical airlifter	An-32	47	
Dornier 228	Germany / India	Tactical airlifter	228-201	62	6 on order
Hawker Siddeley HS 748	United Kingdom	Tactical airlifter	HS 748	56	
Lockheed Martin C-130J	United States	Tactical airlifter	C-130J-30	12	
Boeing C-17	United States	Strategic airlifter	C-17A	11	
Ilyushin Il-76	Soviet Union	Strategic airlifter	Il-76MD	17	
Helicopters
Aérospatiale Alouette III	France / India	Utility	Chetak	79	
Aérospatiale Alouette III	France / India	Utility	Cheetal	18	
Aérospatiale SA 315B	France / India	Utility	Cheetah	18	
HAL Dhruv	India	Utility	Dhruv Mk I/III	95	
HAL Light Utility Helicopter	India	Utility	LUH	–	6 on order
Boeing CH-47	United States	Transport	CH-47F	15	
Mil Mi-17	Russia	Transport	Mi-17V-5	222	
Boeing AH-64	United States	Attack	AH-64E	22	
HAL Prachand	India	Attack	Prachand	10	66 on order
HAL Rudra	India	Attack	Rudra	16	
Mil Mi-24	Russia	Attack	Mi-25/35P	15	
Trainer
BAE Hawk	United Kingdom / India	Advanced trainer	Hawk 132	102	
HAL Kiran	India	Intermediate trainer	HJT-16	77	
HAL HTT-40	India	Basic trainer	HTT-40	3	67 on order
Pilatus PC-7	Switzerland	Basic trainer	PC-7 Mk II	74	
Pipistrel Virus	Slovenia	Ab-initio trainer	Garud	72	
UAV
IAI Heron	Israel	Surveillance	Heron Mk II	9	2 on order
IAI Searcher	Israel	Surveillance	Searcher Mk II	Few	
MQ-9 Reaper	United States	Combat / Surveillance	SkyGuardian	–	8 on order

== Army Aviation Corps ==
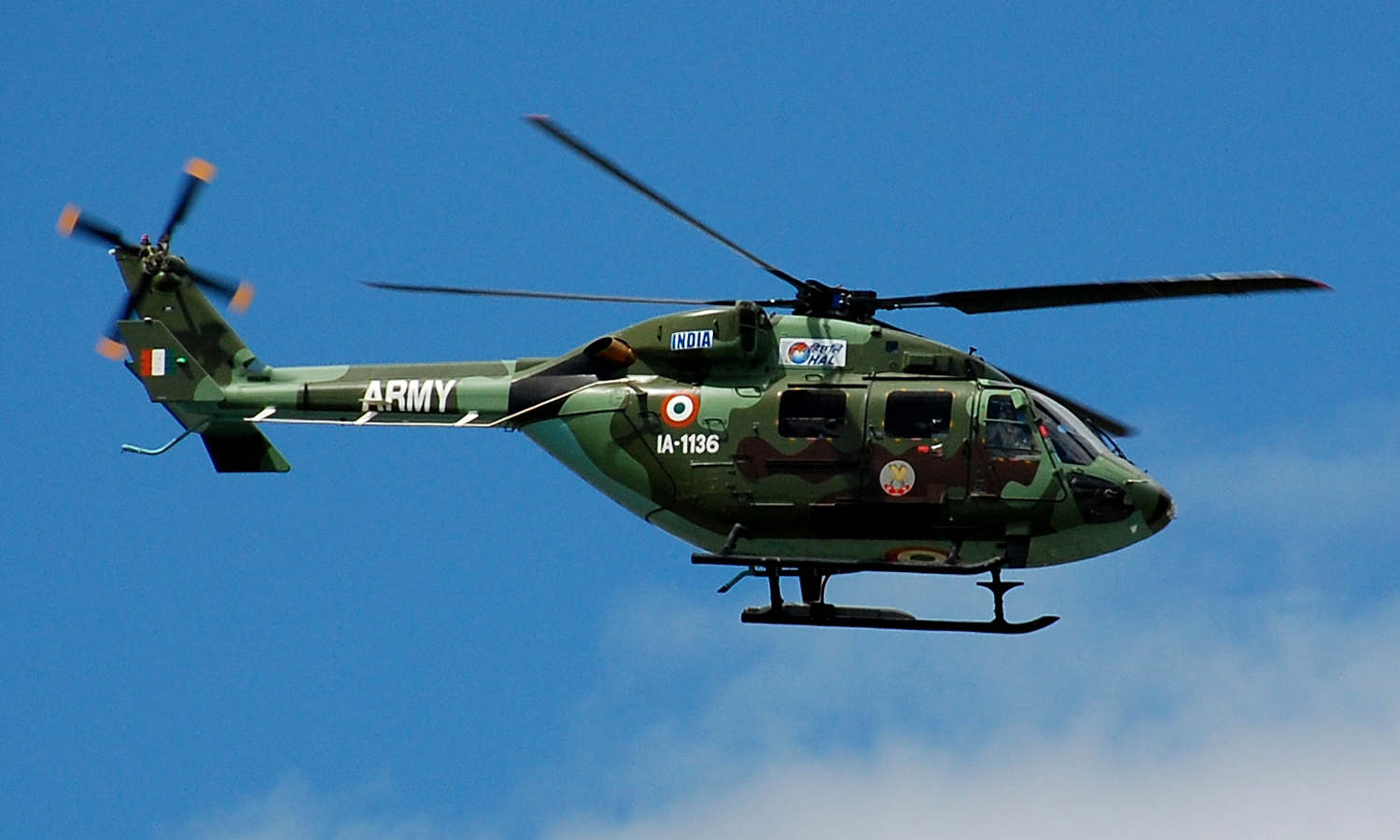
HAL Dhruv

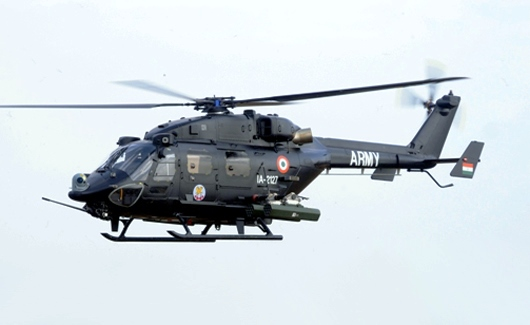
HAL Rudra

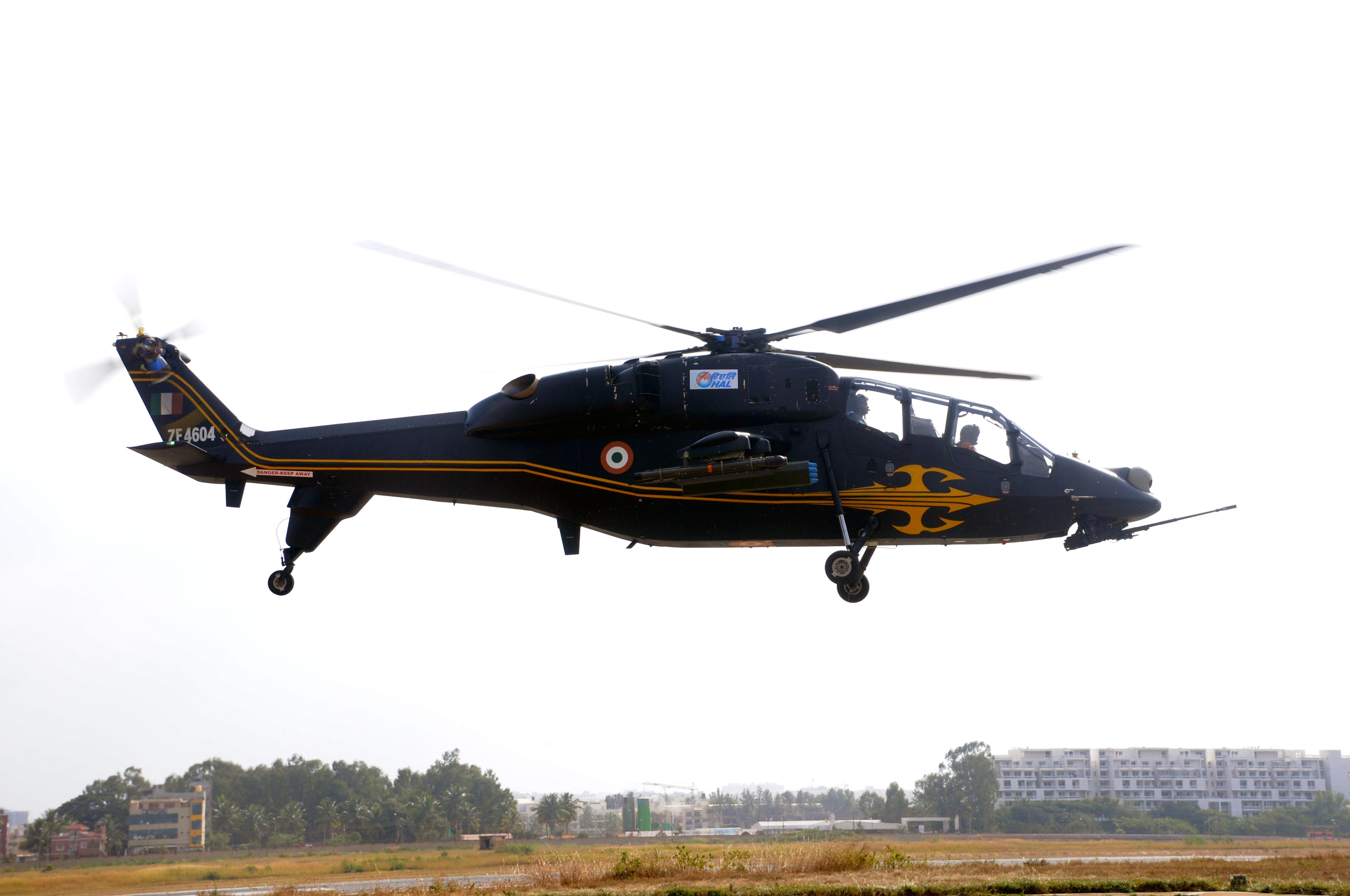
HAL Prachand

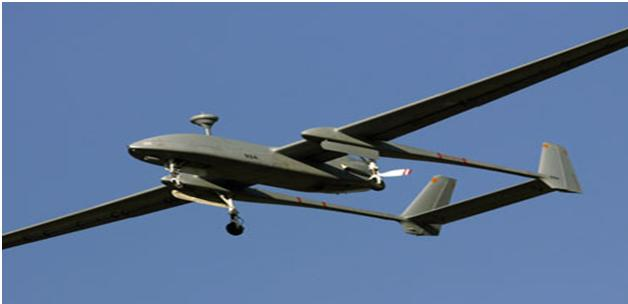
IAI Heron

The Army Aviation Corps was formed on 1 November 1986. It operates a series of helicopters, and unmanned aerial vehicles.

Aircraft	Origin	Type	Variant	In service	Notes
Helicopters
Aérospatiale Alouette III	France / India	Utility	Chetak	60	To be phased out by 2033.
Aérospatiale SA 315B	France / India	Utility	Cheetah	115	To be phased out by 2033.
HAL Dhruv	India	Utility	Dhruv Mk I/II/III	78	25 on order
HAL Light Utility Helicopter	India	Utility	LUH	–	6 on order; 110 planned
Boeing AH-64	United States	Attack	AH-64E	6	
HAL Prachand	India	Attack	Prachand	5	90 on order; 95 planned
HAL Rudra	India	Attack	Rudra	74	
UAV
Asteria AT	India	Surveillance	AT-15	Unknown	
DRDO Nishant	India	Surveillance	Nishant	13	
IAI Heron	Israel	Surveillance	Heron Mk II	4	
IAI Searcher	Israel	Surveillance	Searcher Mk I/II	12	
IFT Switch	India	Surveillance	Switch 1.0	200	More on order
Johnnette JF	India	Surveillance	JF-2	Unknown	
Newspace Beluga/Nimbus	India	Swarm	Beluga/Nimbus	100	
Endure Sabal	India	Cargo	Sabal 20	Unknown	
Raphe mPhibr MR	India	Cargo	MR-20	48	
Gati	India	Grenade launcher	Gati	–	20 on order
MQ-9 Reaper	United States	Combat / Surveillance	SkyGuardian	–	8 on order
Elbit Hermes 900	Israel / India (Note: Manufactured by Adani Defence in partnership with Elbit Systems)	Surveillance	Drishti-10	1	1 on order

== Naval Air Arm ==
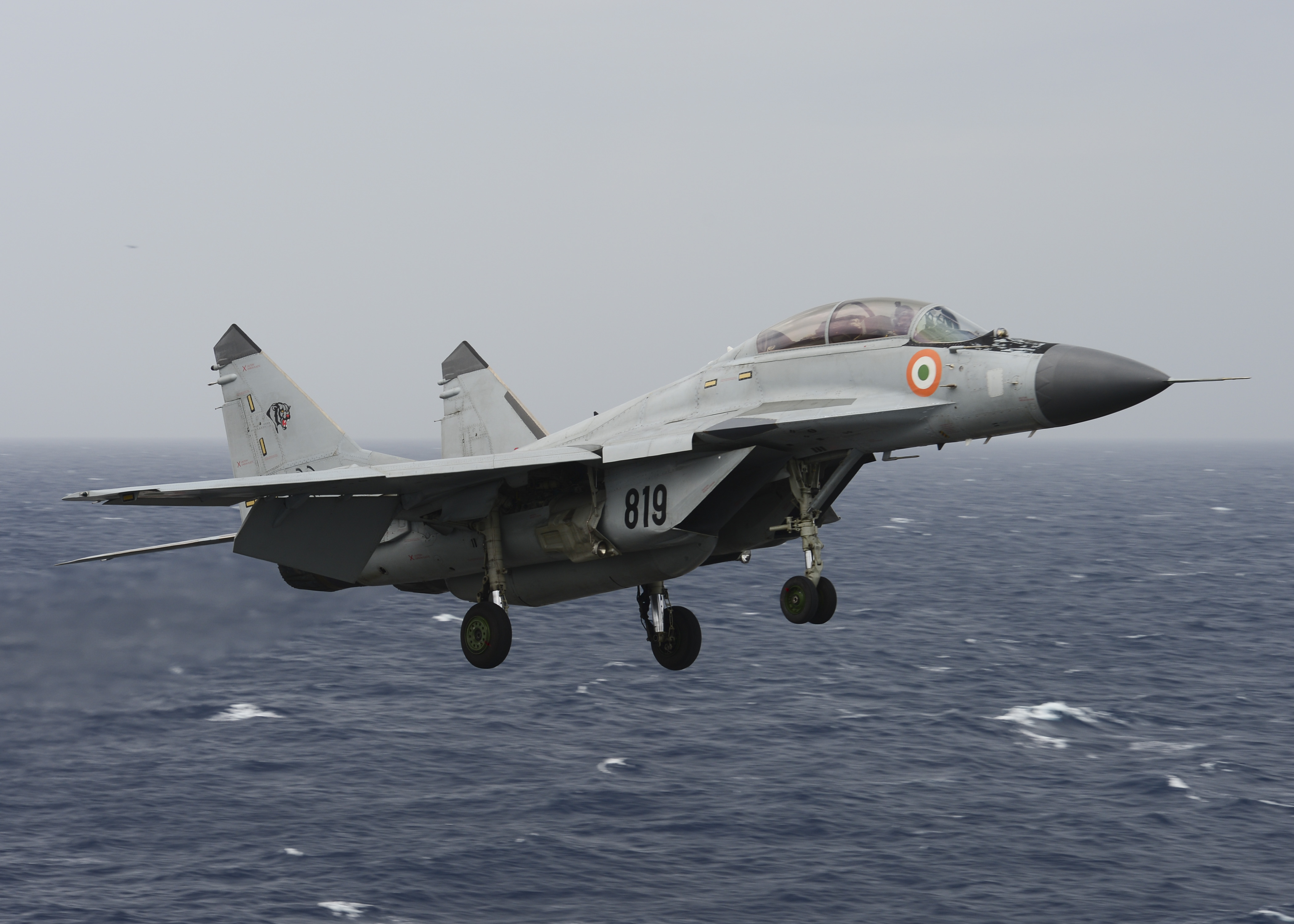
MiG-29K operates from aircraft carriers

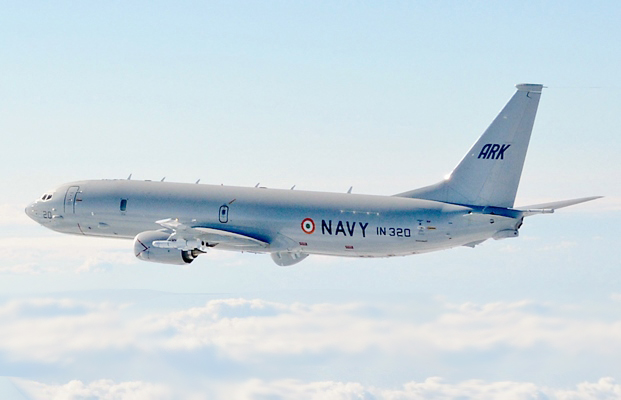
Boeing P-8I maritime patrol aircraft armed with the AGM-84 Harpoon

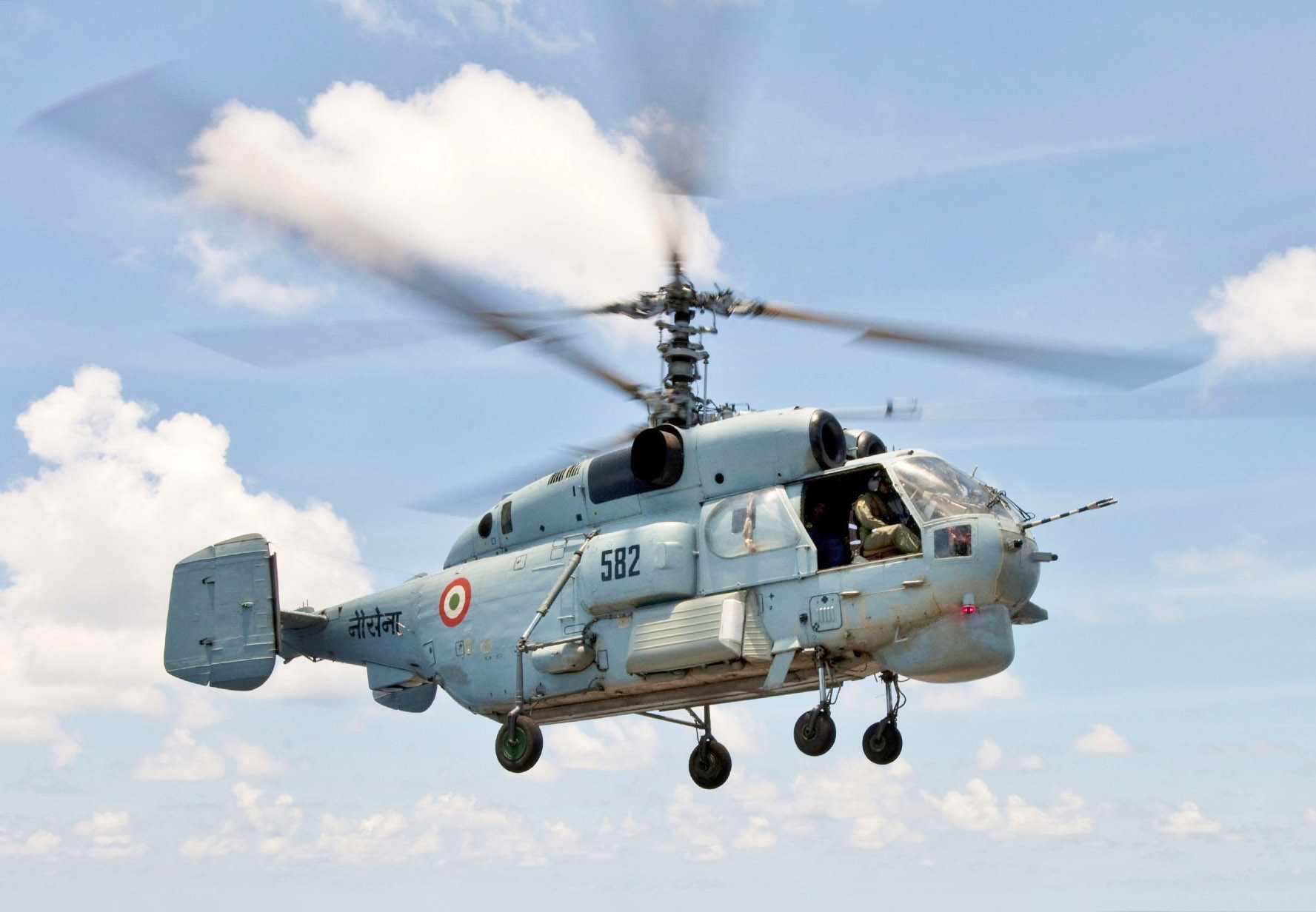
Kamov Ka-31 naval helicopter

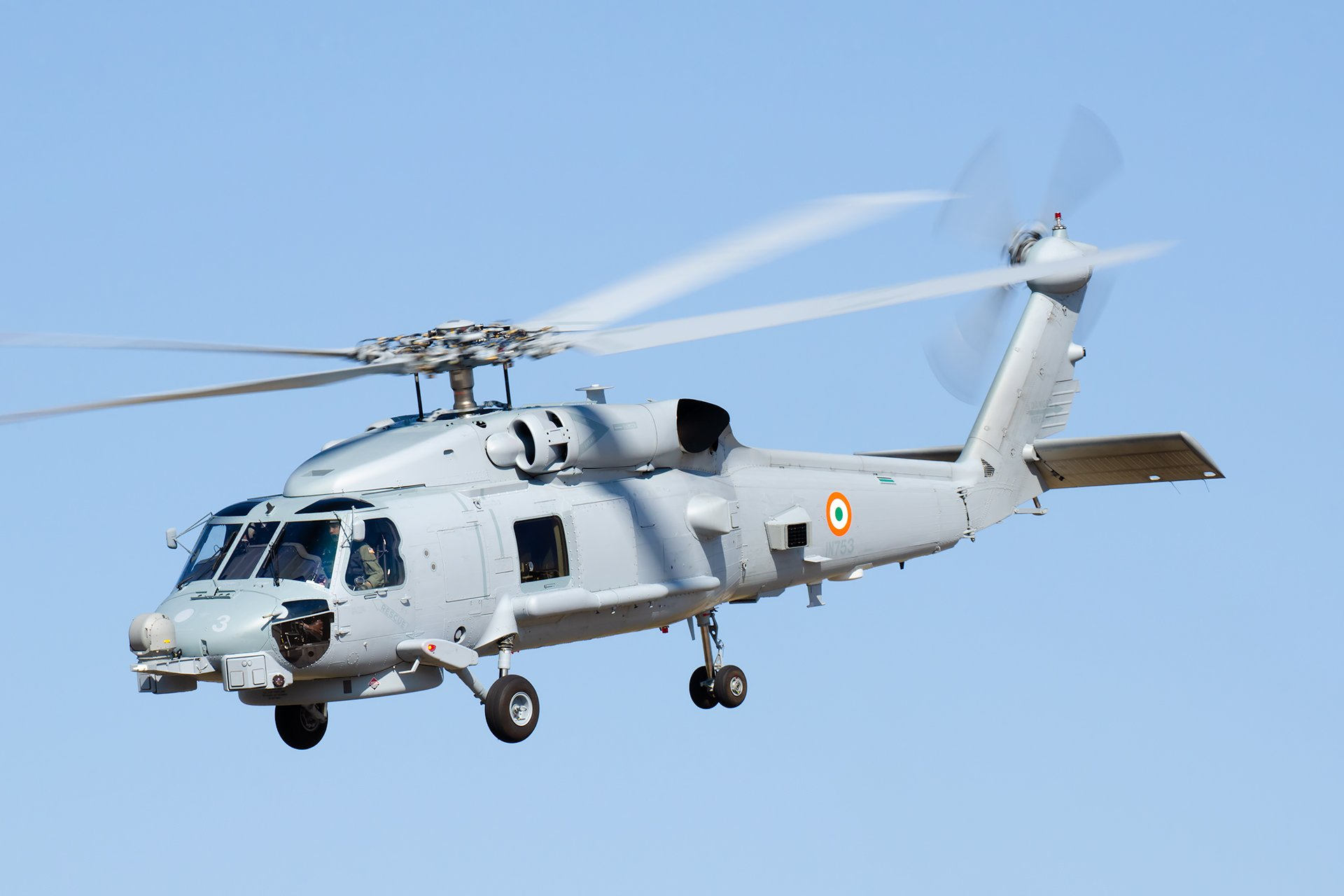
Sikorsky MH-60R Seahawk naval helicopter

The air arm of the Indian Navy was established in 1948. The navy operates 26 air squadrons stationed across eight naval air stations that operate under the flag officers of the various naval commands. The air arm maintains a fleet of combat and maritime patrol aircraft, various helicopters, and unmanned aerial vehicles.

Aircraft	Origin	Type	Variant	In service	Notes
Combat
Dassault Rafale	France	Multirole	Rafale M	–	26 (22 single-seat and four twin-seat) on order
Mikoyan MiG-29K	Russia	Multirole	MiG-29K	34	
Mikoyan MiG-29K	Russia	Multirole	MiG-29KUB	6	Two seater
Patrol / Utility
Boeing P-8	United States	ASW / Patrol	P-8I	12	6 planned
Britten-Norman BN-2	United Kingdom	Patrol / Utility	BN-2B/2T	4	
Dornier 228	Germany / India	Patrol / Surveillance	228-201	31	Includes 4 upgraded, rest being upgraded. 8 more on order
Helicopters
Aérospatiale Alouette III	France / India	Utility	Chetak	42	
HAL Dhruv	India	Utility	Dhruv Mk I/III	24	
Kamov Ka-27	Russia	ASW	Ka-28	14	
Westland Sea King	United Kingdom	ASW	WS-61 Mk 42B	25	
Westland Sea King	United Kingdom	Utility	WS-61 Mk 42C	25	
Kamov Ka-31	Russia	AEW	Ka-31	14	
Sikorsky SH-60	United States	Combat / Utility	MH-60R	22	2 on order
Trainer
BAE Hawk	United Kingdom / India	Jet trainer	Hawk 132	17	
HAL Kiran	India	Jet trainer	HJT-16	18	
Pipistrel Virus	Slovenia	Ab-initio trainer	Garud	12	
UAV
Elbit Hermes 900	Israel / India	Surveillance	Drishti-10	1	10 planned
IAI Heron	Israel	Surveillance	Heron Mk I	10	
General Atomics MQ-9 Reaper	United States	Combat / Surveillance	SeaGuardian	2	15 on order

== Coast Guard ==
The Indian Coast Guard is a maritime armed force, which was formed in 1978. It is involved in the protection of the maritime and offshore assets, and protecting the oceanic boundaries. The coast guard operates various ships and aircraft including fixed wing reconnaissance aircraft and helicopters.

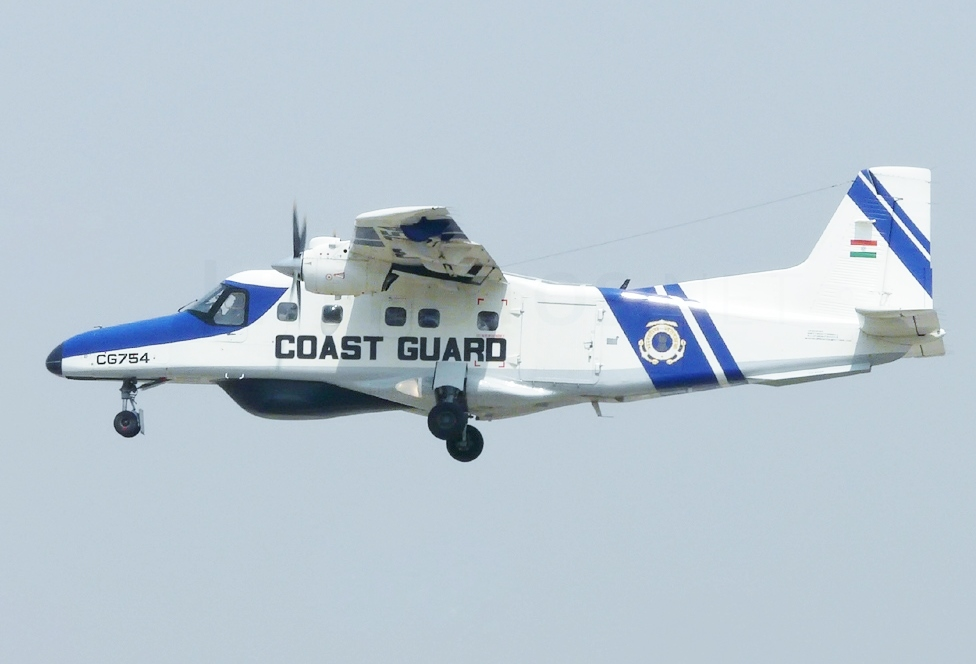
Dornier 228 of the Indian Coast Guard

Aircraft	Origin	Type	Variant	In service	Notes
Patrol
Dornier 228	Germany / India	Patrol / Reconnaissance	228-101/201	41	2 upgraded in 2024, 2 inducted in 2026; 8 on order
Helicopters
Aérospatiale Alouette III	France / India	Utility	Chetak	19	
HAL Dhruv	India	Utility	Dhruv Mk I	4	
HAL Dhruv	India	Utility	Dhruv Mk III	19	11 on order

== See also ==
- Active military equipment by country
- Historical aircraft of the Indian Air Force
- Indian Army equipment
- Indian military missiles
- Indian military radars
- Indian Navy ships
- Indian weapons of mass destruction
