= Bharani Mk-I =

Indian 2D lowlevel lightweight surveillance radar

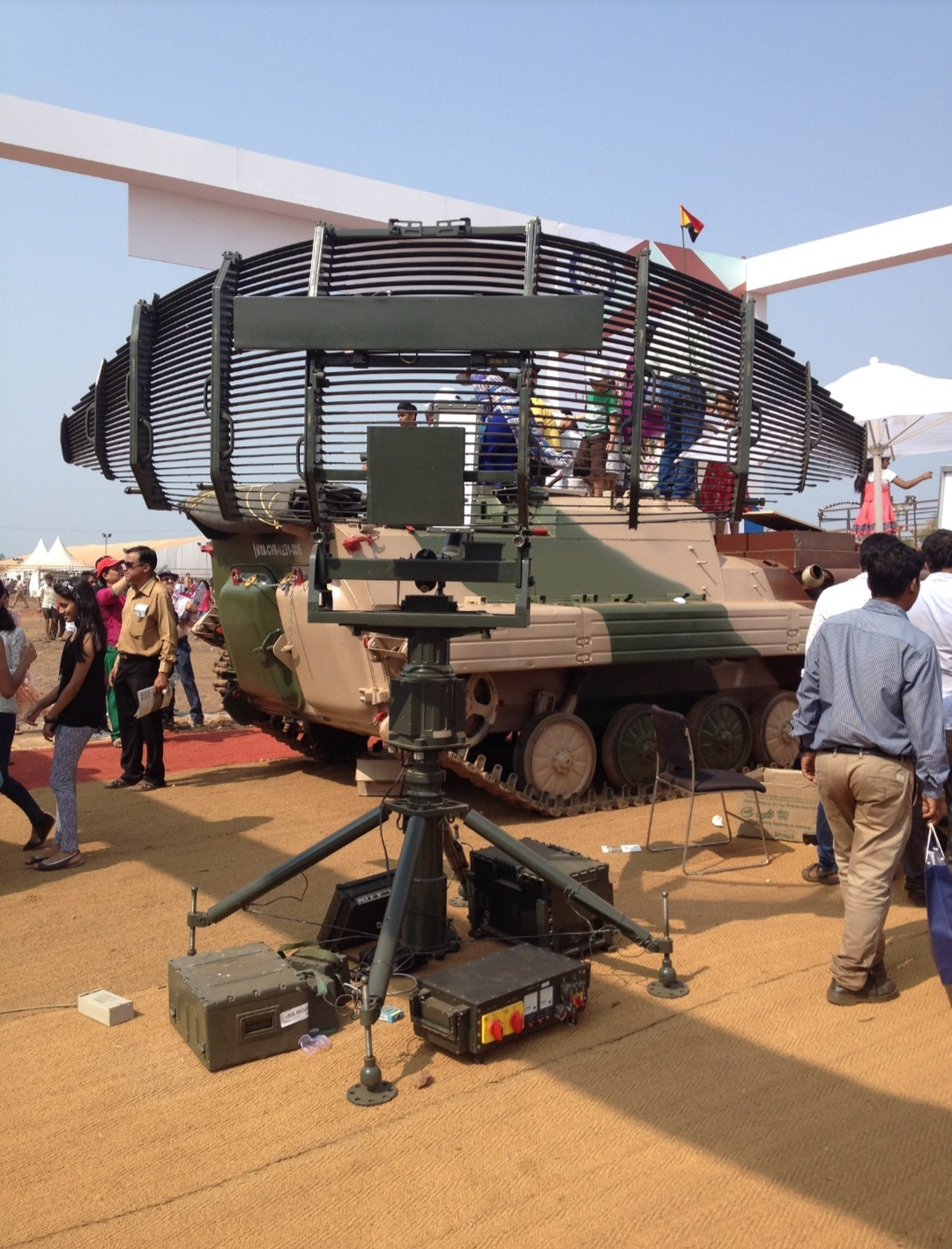
- Type: 2D low level lightweight radar
- Place of origin: India

Service history
- Used by: Indian Army

Production history
- Designer: DRDO
- Manufacturer: Bharat Electronics Limited
- Developed from: Electronics and Radar Development Establishment

Bharani Mk-I is a two dimensional lowlevel lightweight surveillance radar made in India by the Defence Research and Development Organisation . It to provide low-level air surveillance in mountainous terrain for aerial targets like unmanned aerial vehicles (UAVs), remotely piloted vehicles (RPVs), helicopters and fixed-wing aircraft flying at low and medium altitudes. It is a lightweight, battery-powered system for rapid deployment in Indian Army for air defence units.

== Namesake ==
It was named after Bharani a day in Hindu calendar which refers to the second lunar mansion (nakshatra) in Hindu astronomy.

== History ==
Bharani radar was developed by DRDO's Electronics and Radar Development Establishment to provide the Indian Army with a lightweight radar, capable of filling low level air surveillance gaps, particularly in mountain areas. Before induction with the Indian Army, the radar underwent user trials in three phases, including in mountain terrains, which was successfully completed in 2011. Thereafter, the Ministry of Defence approved the acquisition of 16 systems.
