= Aslesha Mk-I =

Indian 3D surveillance radar

- Type: 3D low-level surveillance radar
- Place of origin: India

Service history
- Used by: Indian Air Force

Production history
- Designer: Defence Research and Development Organisation
- Manufacturer: Bharat Electronics Limited
- Developed from: Electronics and Radar Development Establishment

Aslesha Mk-I is a three dimensional low level surveillance radar developed in India by the Defence Research and Development Organisation (DRDO). It was designed to detect and track low- and medium-altitude aerial targets, including hovering helicopters, fighter aircraft and unmanned aerial vehicles.

== Description ==
Aslesha is an S-band, 3D radar with gallium nitride (GaN)-based active electronically scanned array (AESA) technology. DRDO states that the system has a range of approximately 50 km and can operate in either networked or standalone configurations.

== Development ==
The development of the Aslesha radar was undertaken by DRDO to meet an Indian Air Force requirement for a lightweight low-level surveillance radar. It was began in 2004, and Bharat Electronics Limited received a production contract on 2012 for 21 systems.

== Operational use ==
Aslesha radar was inducted in the Indian Air Force by 2021.

== Further development ==
The Improved Low Level Light Weight Radar, abbreviated as LLLR(I), is a variant of Aslesha radar family. The systems feature four fixed phased-array panels with GaN-based AESA technology derived from the Aslesha Mk-I radar. This ensures 360° detection coverage without rotation mechanism. It can detect fighter aircraft as well as micro drones at low altitudes with additional prioritised aerial targeting capability which improves is role as counter unmanned air system (C-UAS).

On 21 October 2026, Bharat Electronics received a contract worth ₹770 crore (US$80 million) to supply the LLLR(I) radar systems to the Indian Army.
