= Aero India =

Biennial air show and aviation exhibition in Bengaluru, India

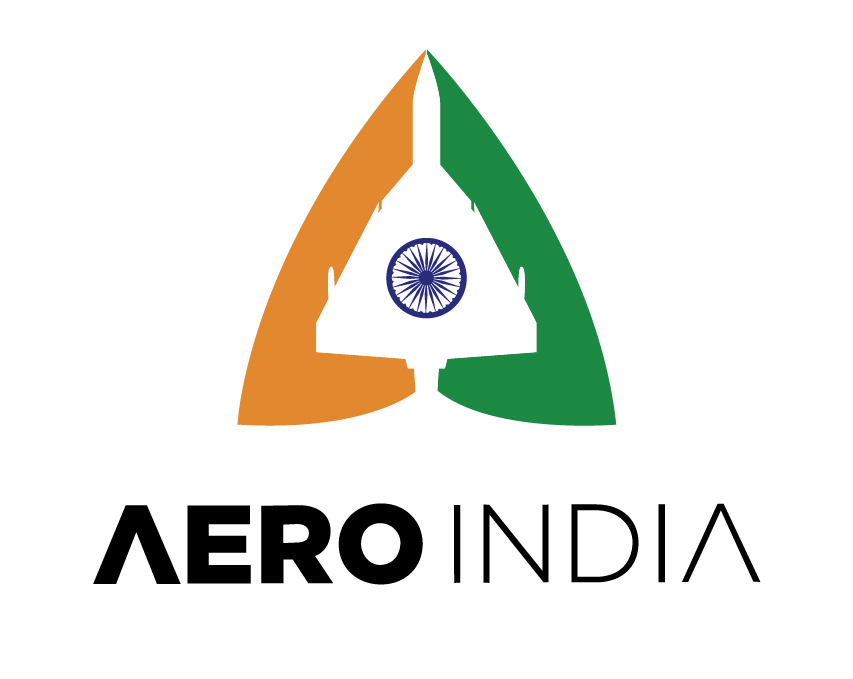
- Aero India logo
- Status: Active
- Genre: Air show and Exhibition
- Dates: February
- Frequency: Biennial: Odd years
- Venue: Yelahanka Air Force Station
- Locations: Yelahanka, Bengaluru, Karnataka
- Coordinates: 13°08′09″N 77°36′27″E
- Country: India
- Established: 1996; 30 years ago
- Most recent: 2025
- Next event: 2027
- Participants: 731 exhibitors (2023)
- Attendance: 2,075,000 (2011)
- Area: 108,250 sq m (2015)
- Major events: Aerobatics; Static display
- Organiser: Defence Exhibition Organisation
- Website: www.aeroindia.gov.in

Aero India is a biennial air show and aviation exhibition held in Bengaluru, India, at the Yelahanka Air Force Station. It is organised by the Defence Exhibition Organisation, Ministry of Defence.

== Organisers ==
The Ministry of Defence, Indian Air Force, Hindustan Aeronautics Limited (HAL), Defence Research and Development Organisation (DRDO), Department of Space, Defence Exhibition Organisation, the Union Civil Aviation Ministry and other such organisations organise the Aero India show.

== Air shows ==
The first edition of the air show was held in 1996. Subsequently, the Aero India has emerged as a significant military aviation exhibition. The Mikoyan MiG-35 and F-16IN Super Viper were unveiled for the first time at the 6th and 7th editions of Aero India respectively.

The 15th and the most recent edition of the Aero India was held from 10 to 14 February 2025. The theme of the event is "The Runway to a Billion Opportunities". While only business visitors will be allowed on the first three days of the event, general public will have a chance to visit and enjoy the air shows on the last two days.

== Gallery ==
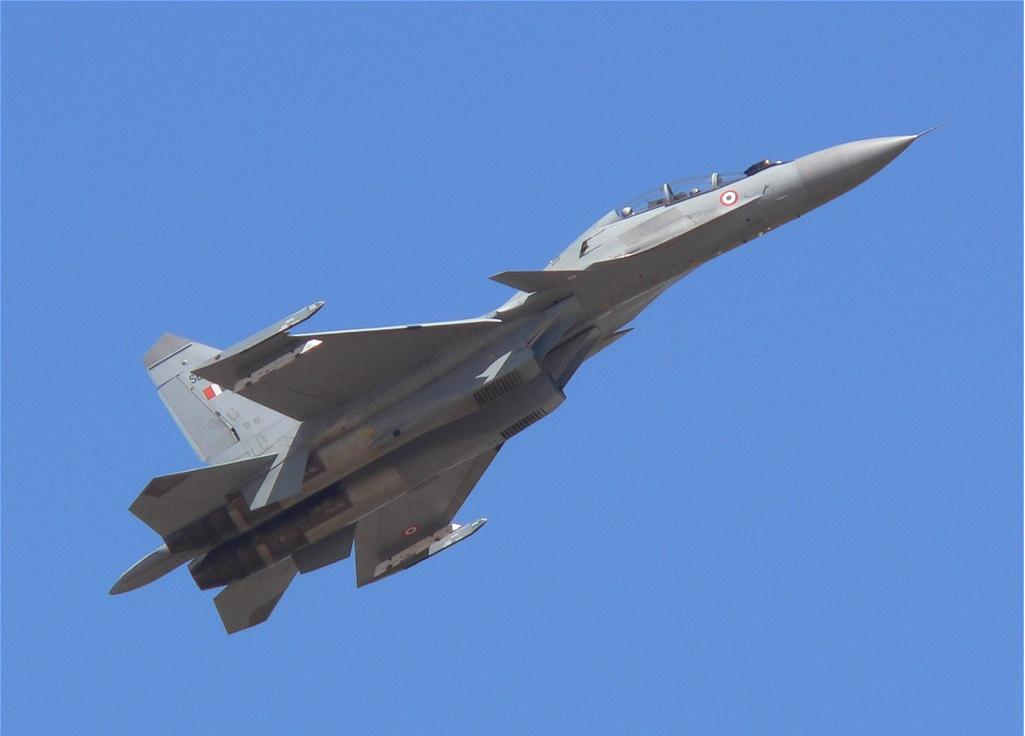
An IAF Sukhoi Su-30MKI at Aero India 2007

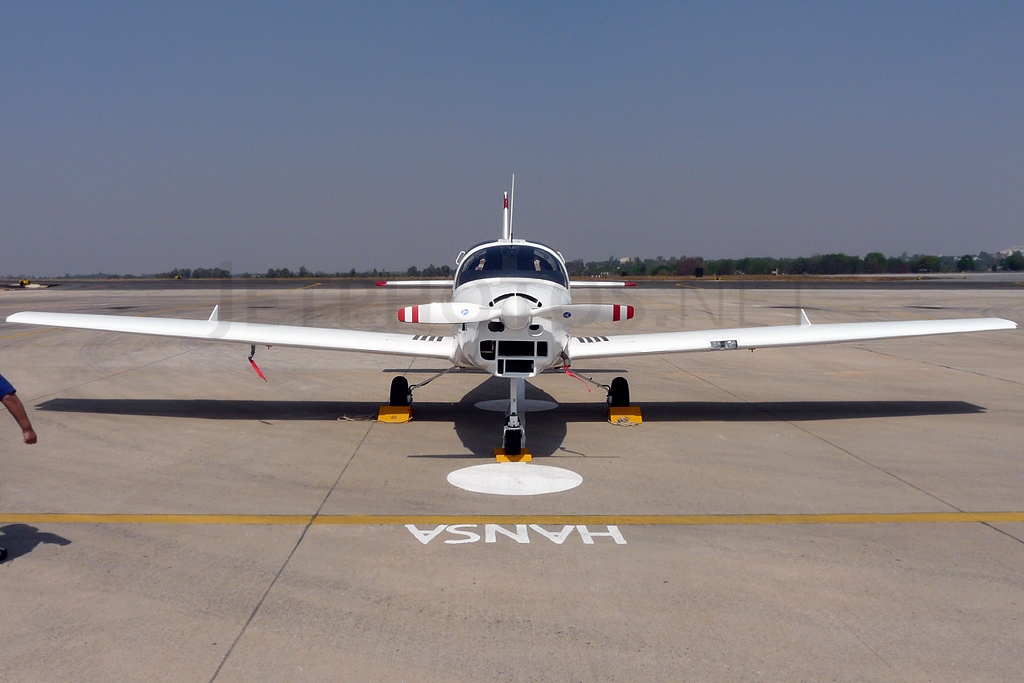
NAL Hansa at Aero India

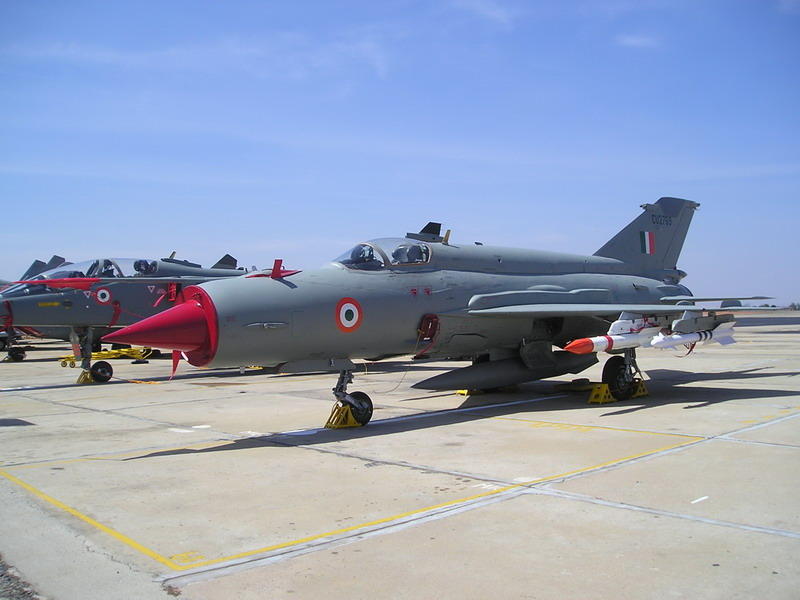
An IAF MiG-21 Bison at Aero India 2005

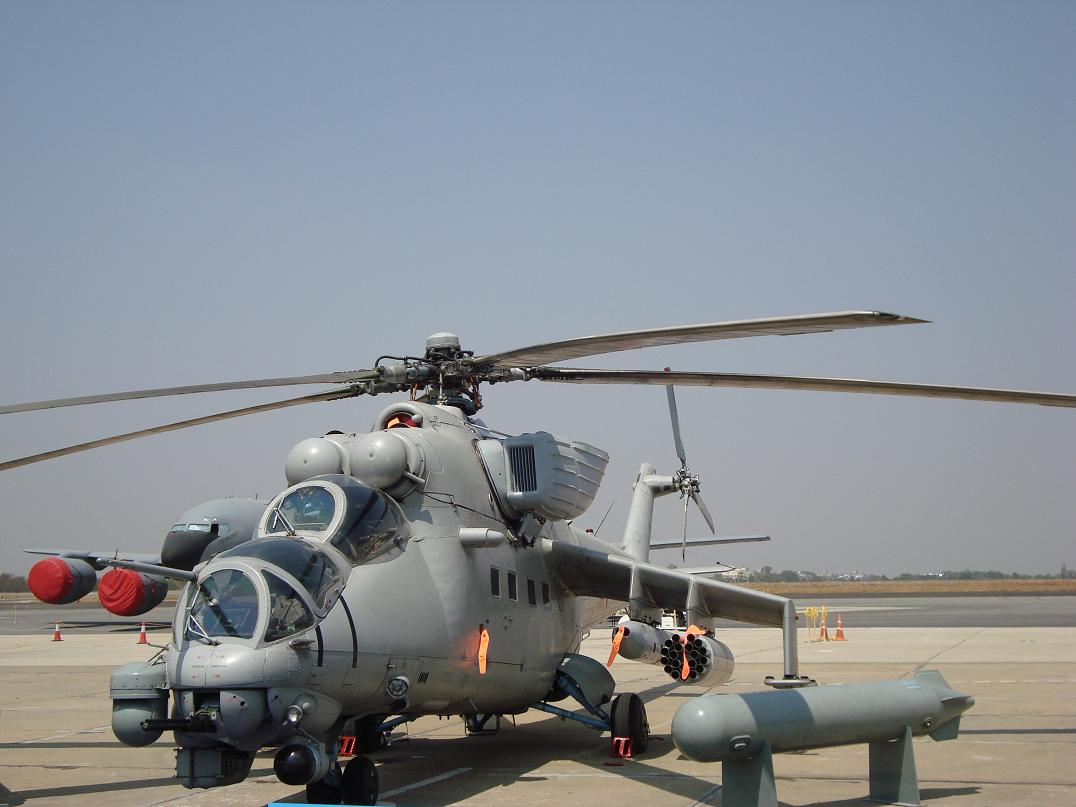
An IAF Mi-35 Hind at Aero India 2009

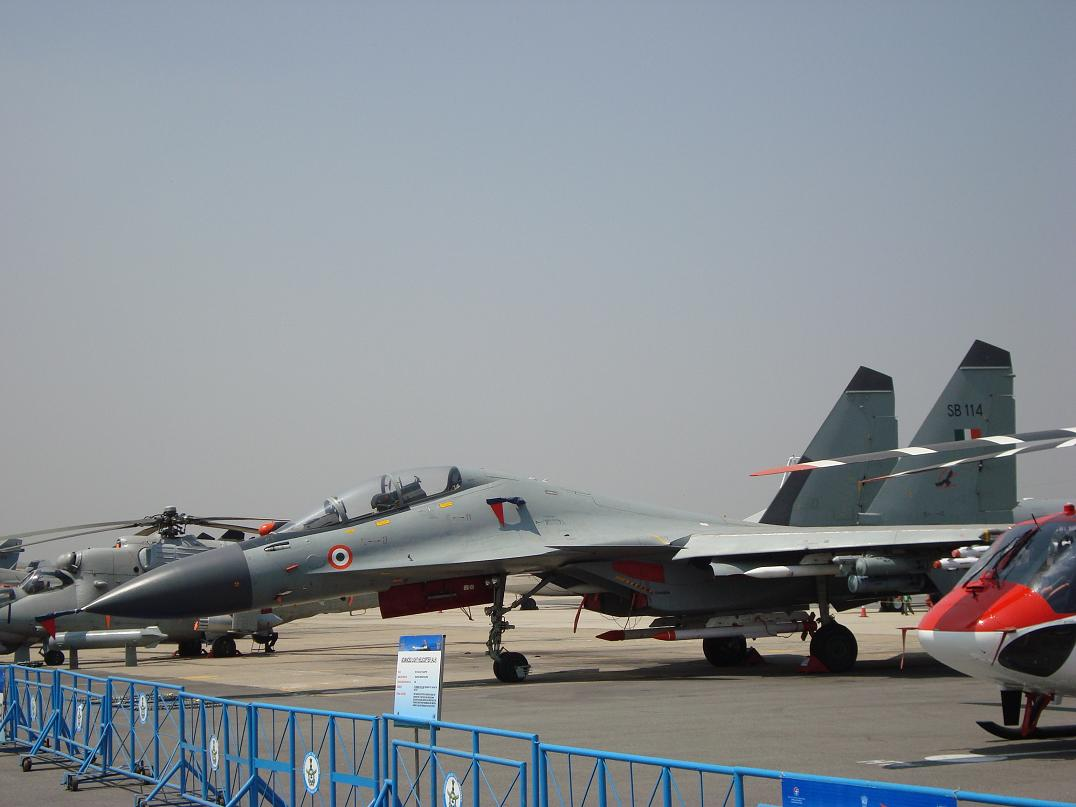
A Sukhoi Su-30MKI at Aero India 2009

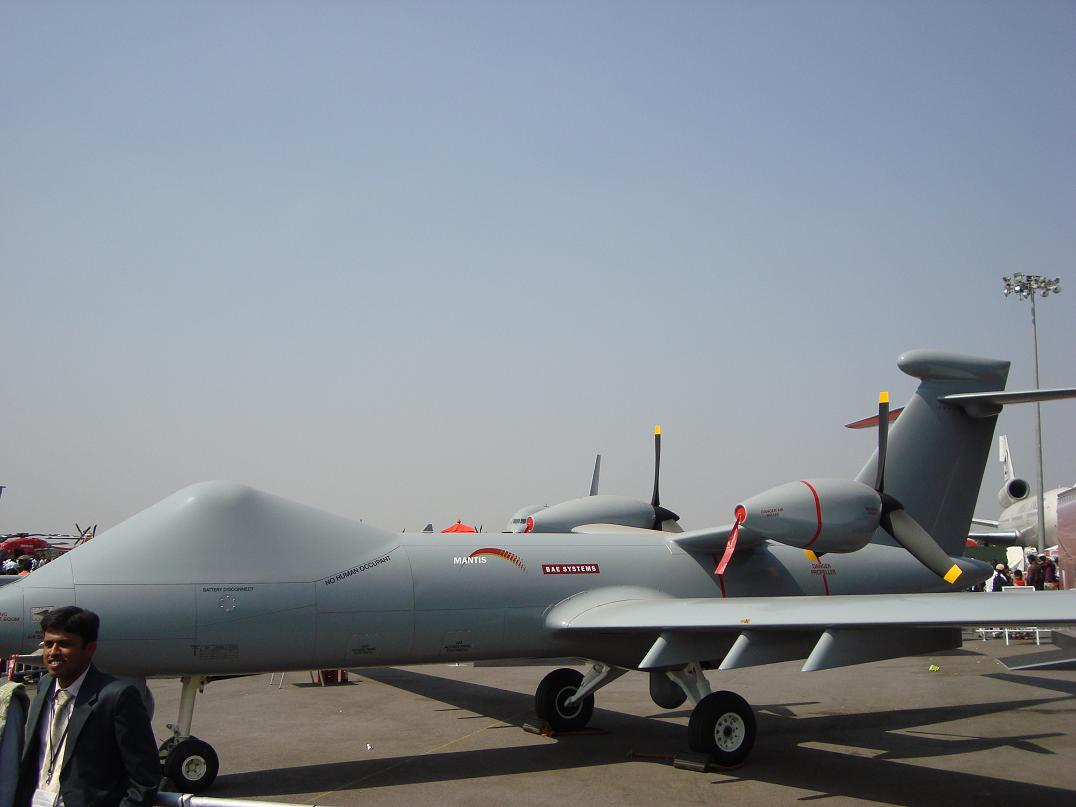
A BAE Systems Mantis at Aero India 2009

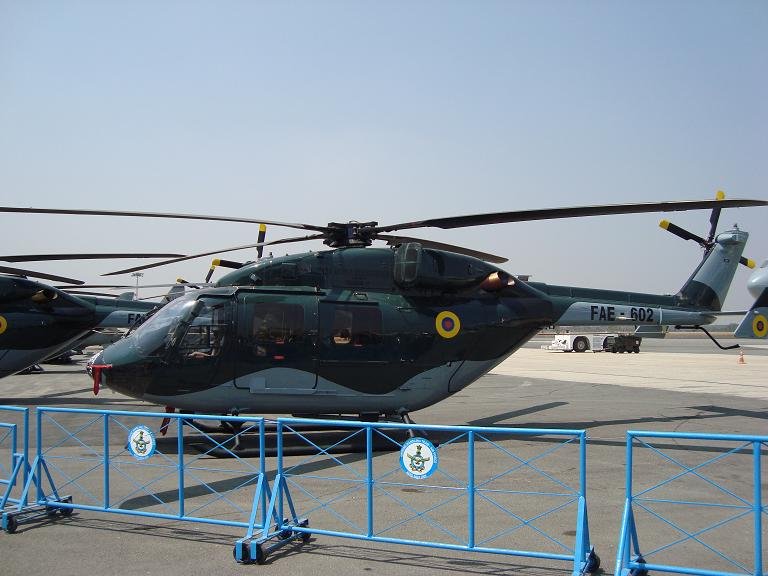
HAL Dhruv helicopters at Aero India 2009

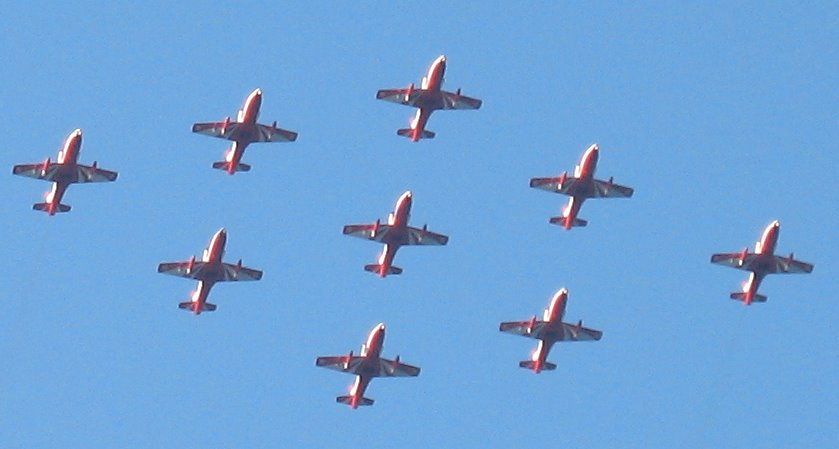
IAF Surya Kiran aerobatic team at Aero India 2009

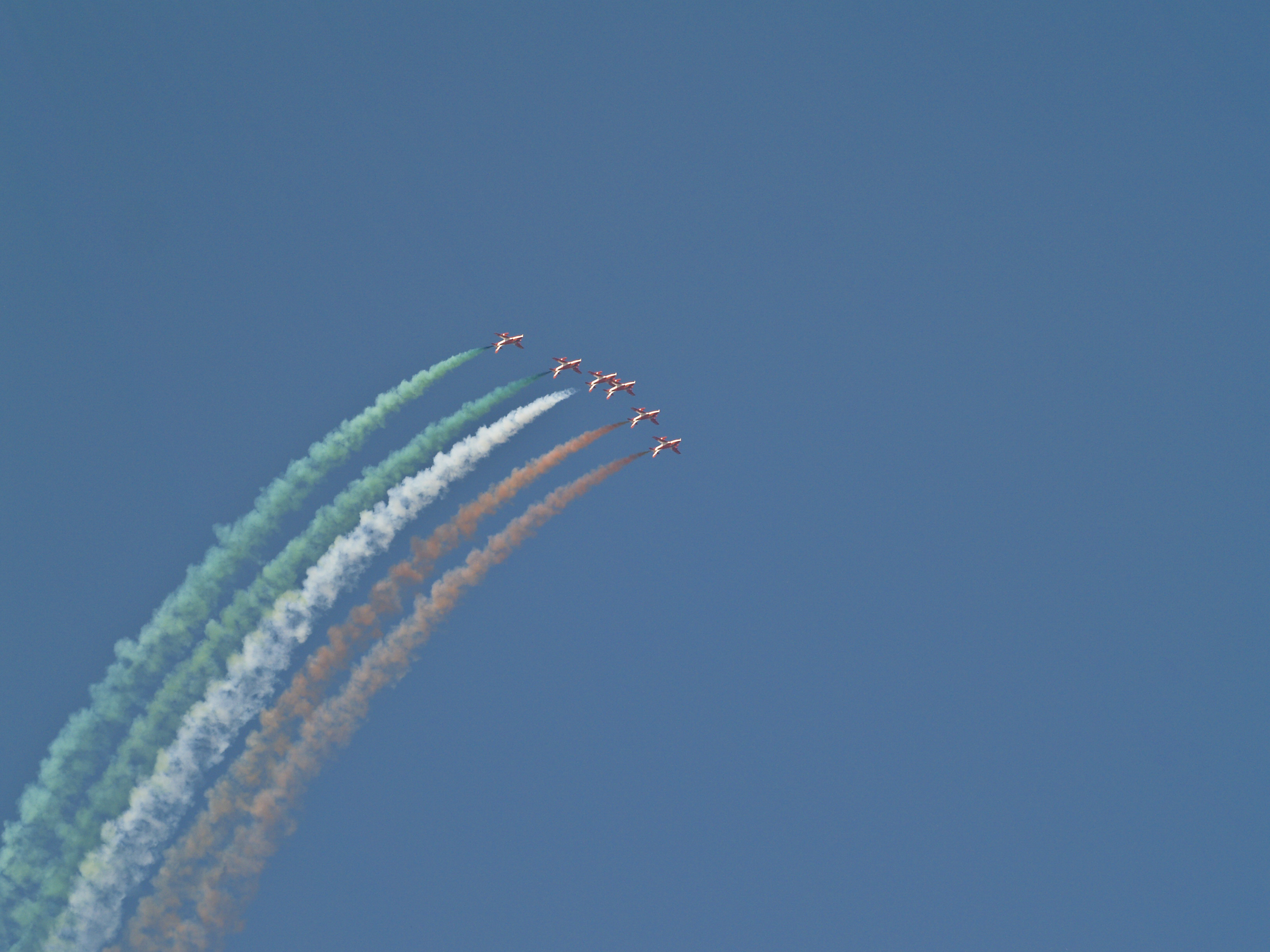
Surya Kiran aerobatic team at Aero India 2009

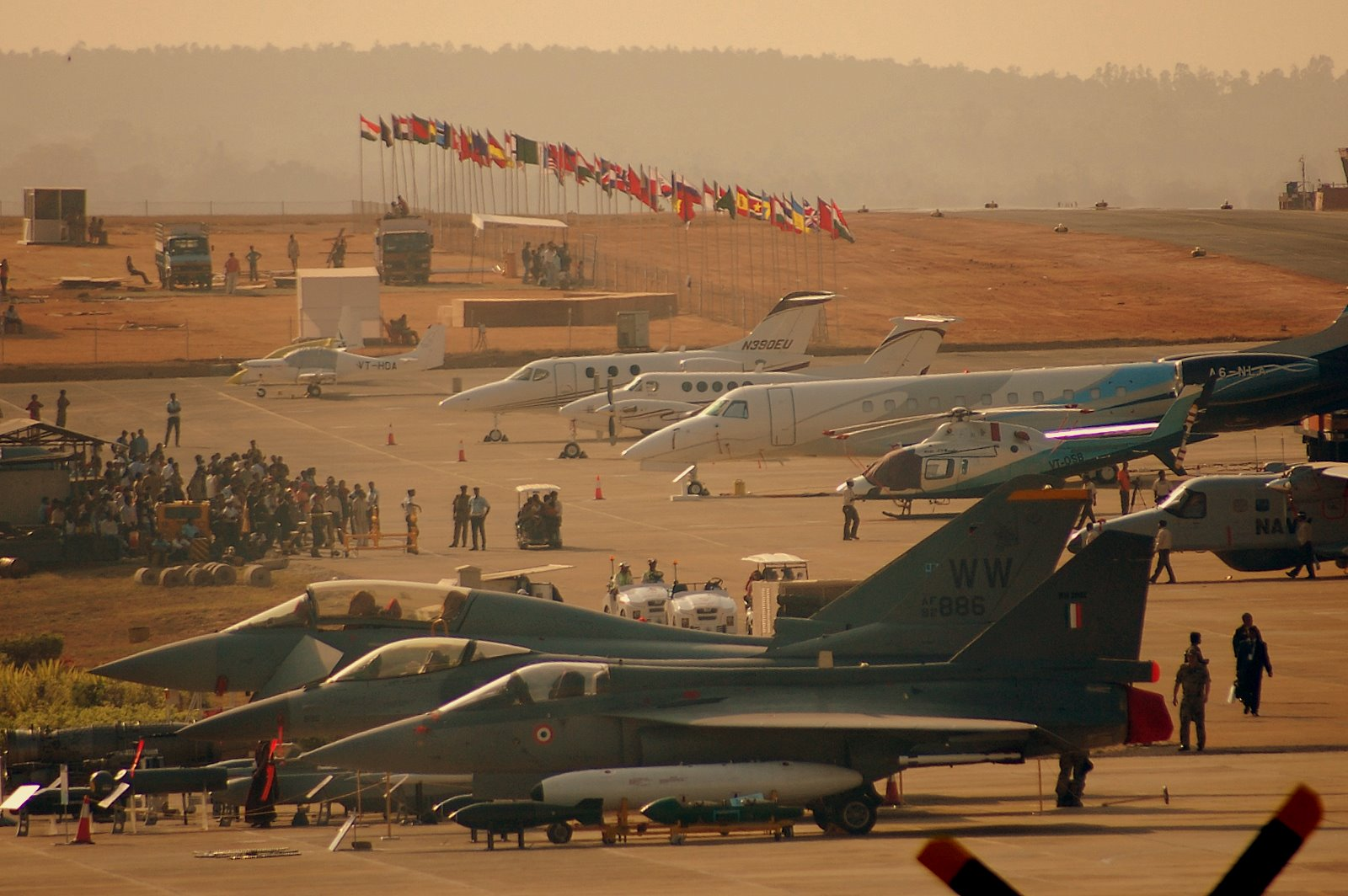
HAL Tejas, F-16 and Eurofighter Typhoon at Aero India 2011

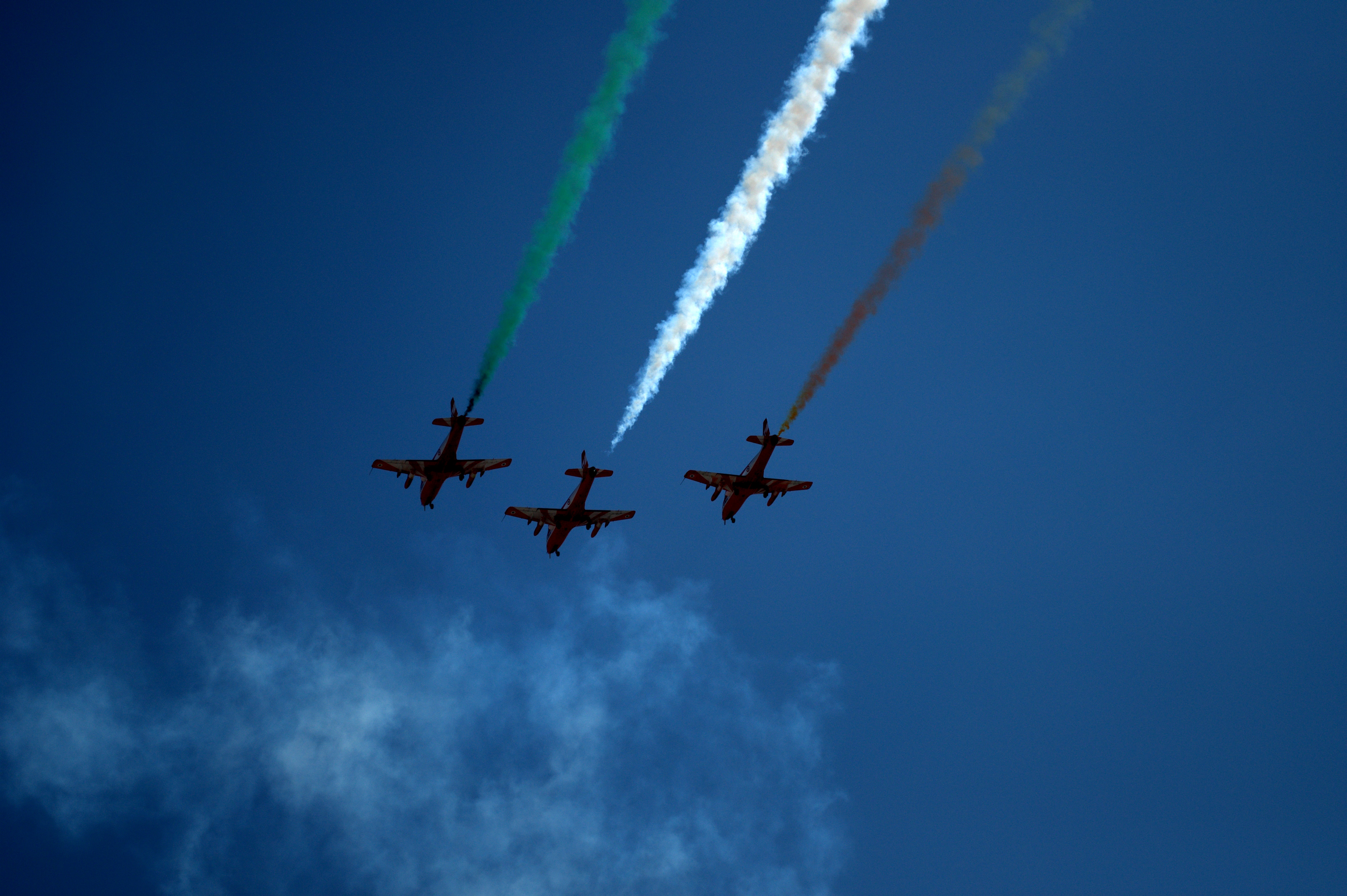
Surya Kiran aerobatic team tn Aero India 2011

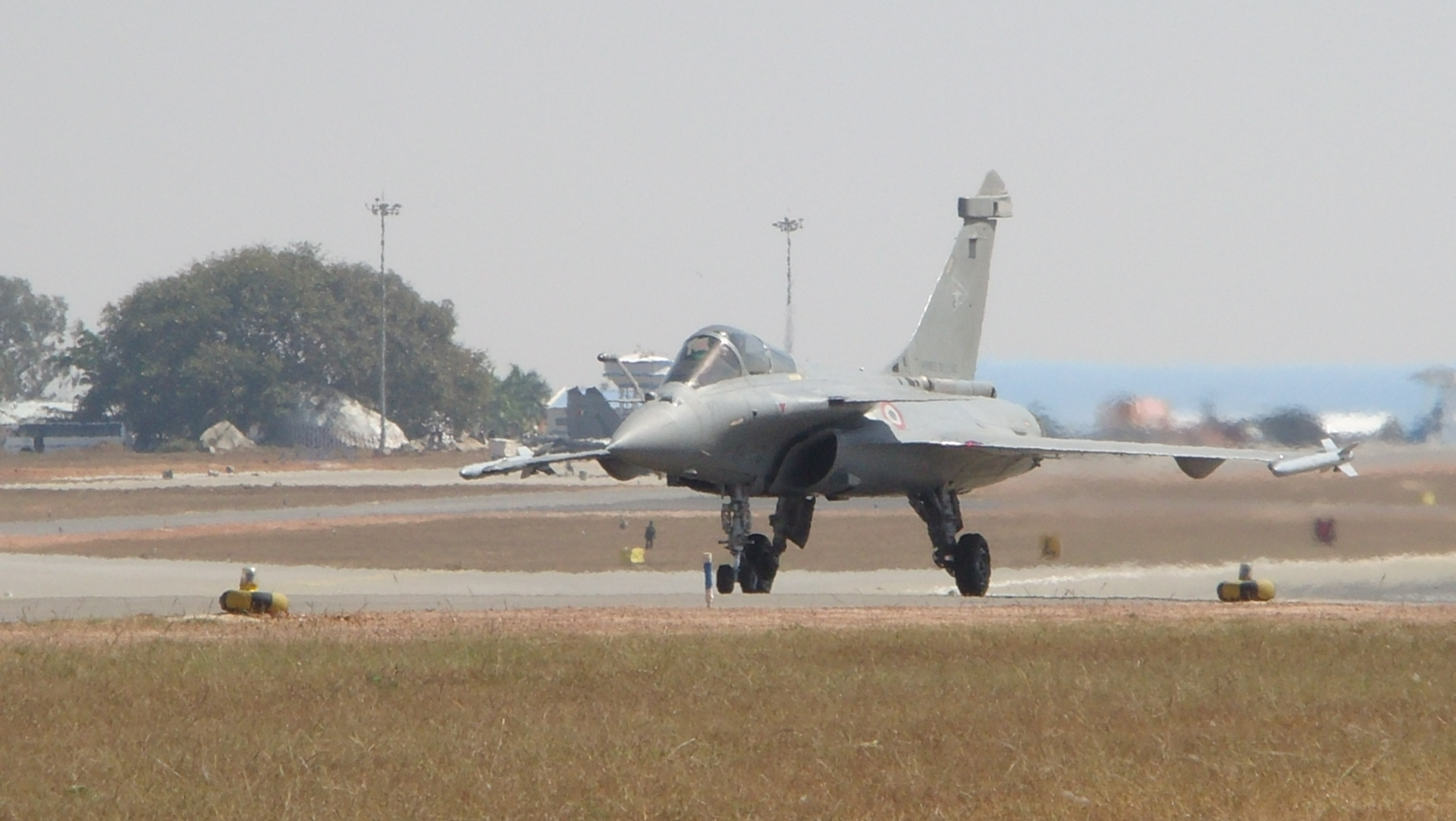
A Dassault Rafale at Aero India 2011

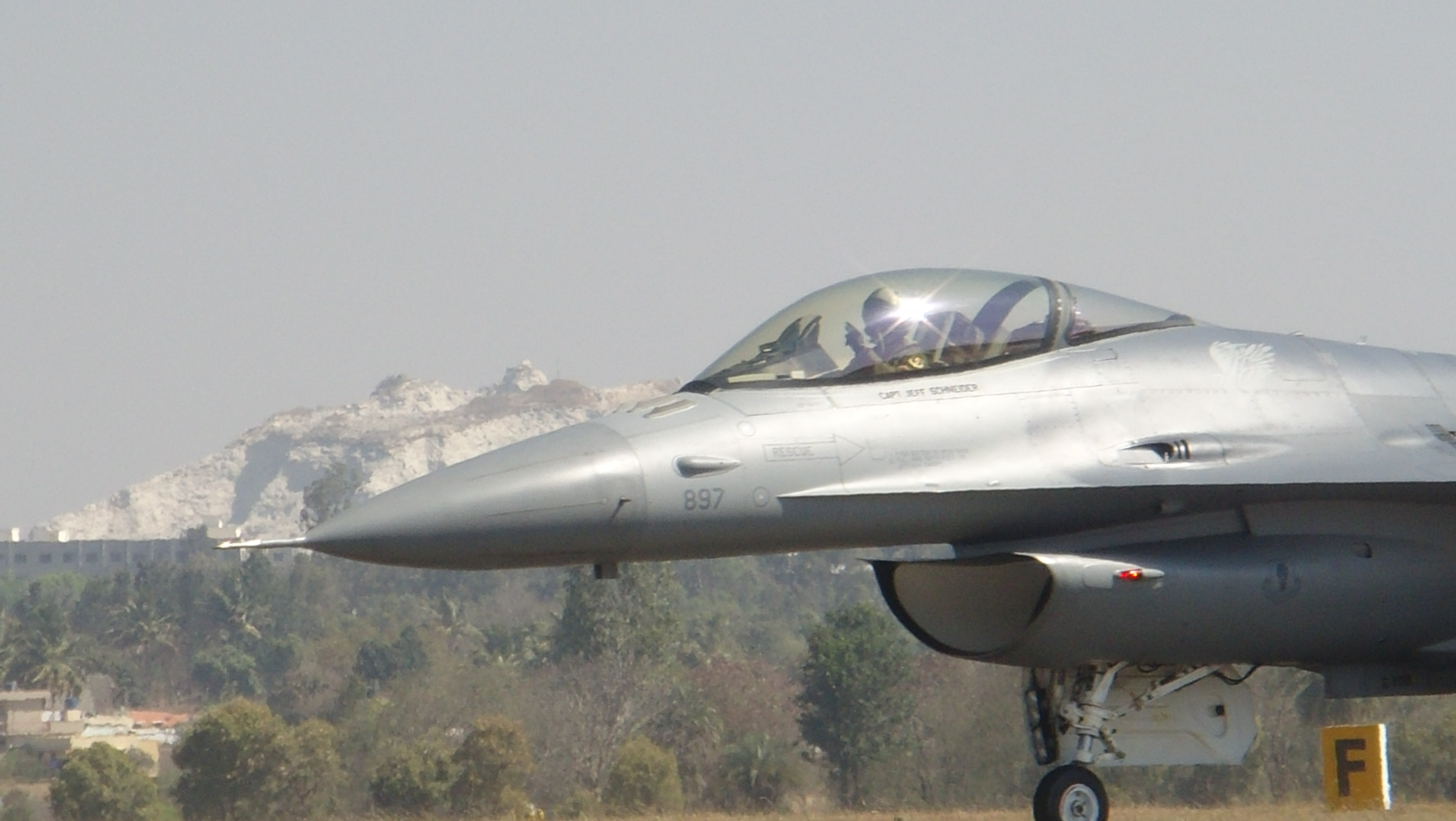
USAF F-16 at Aero India 2011

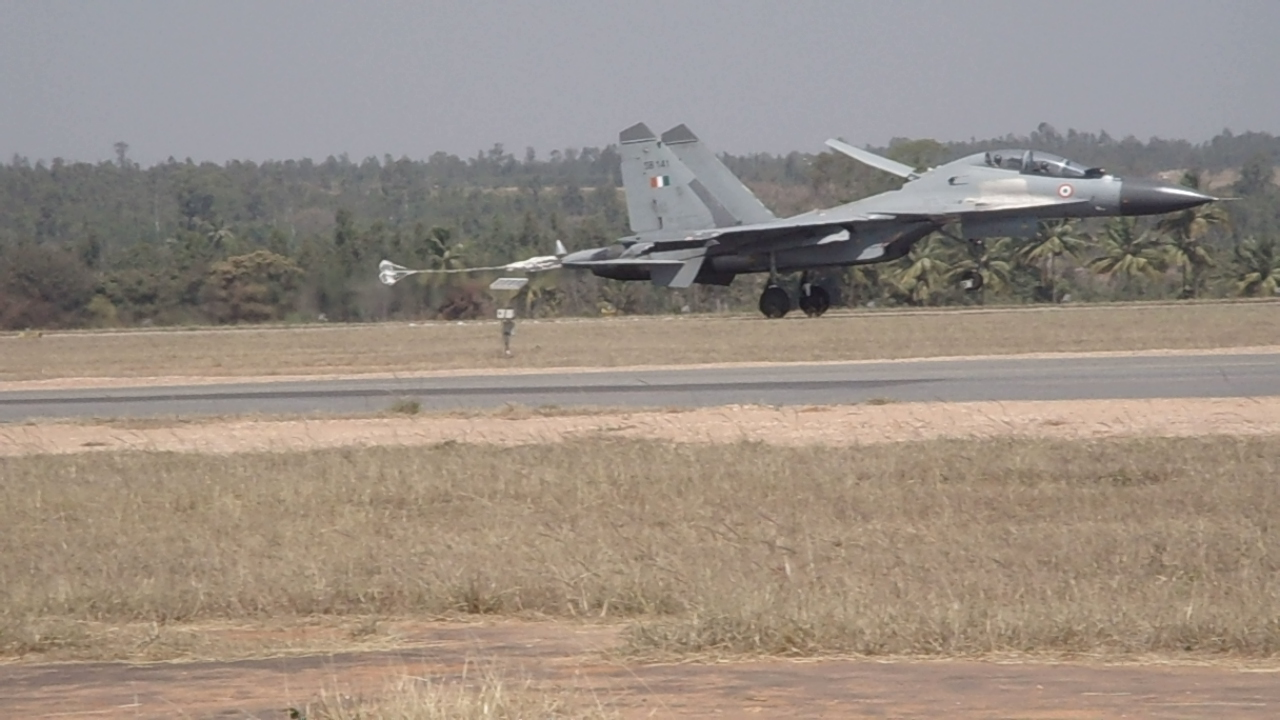
A Sukhoi Su-30MKI at Aero India 2011

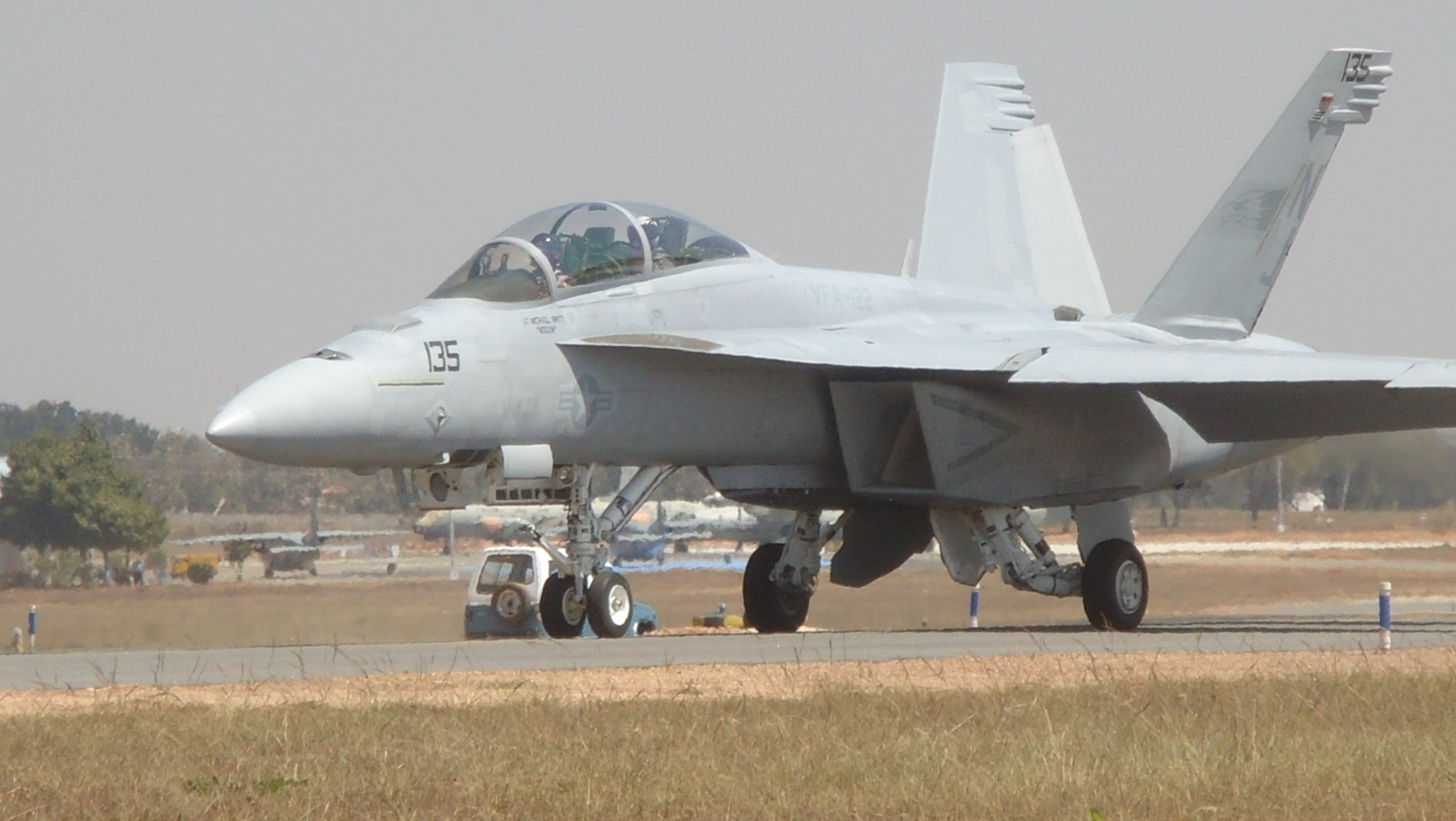
A F/A-18F Super Hornet at Aero India 2011

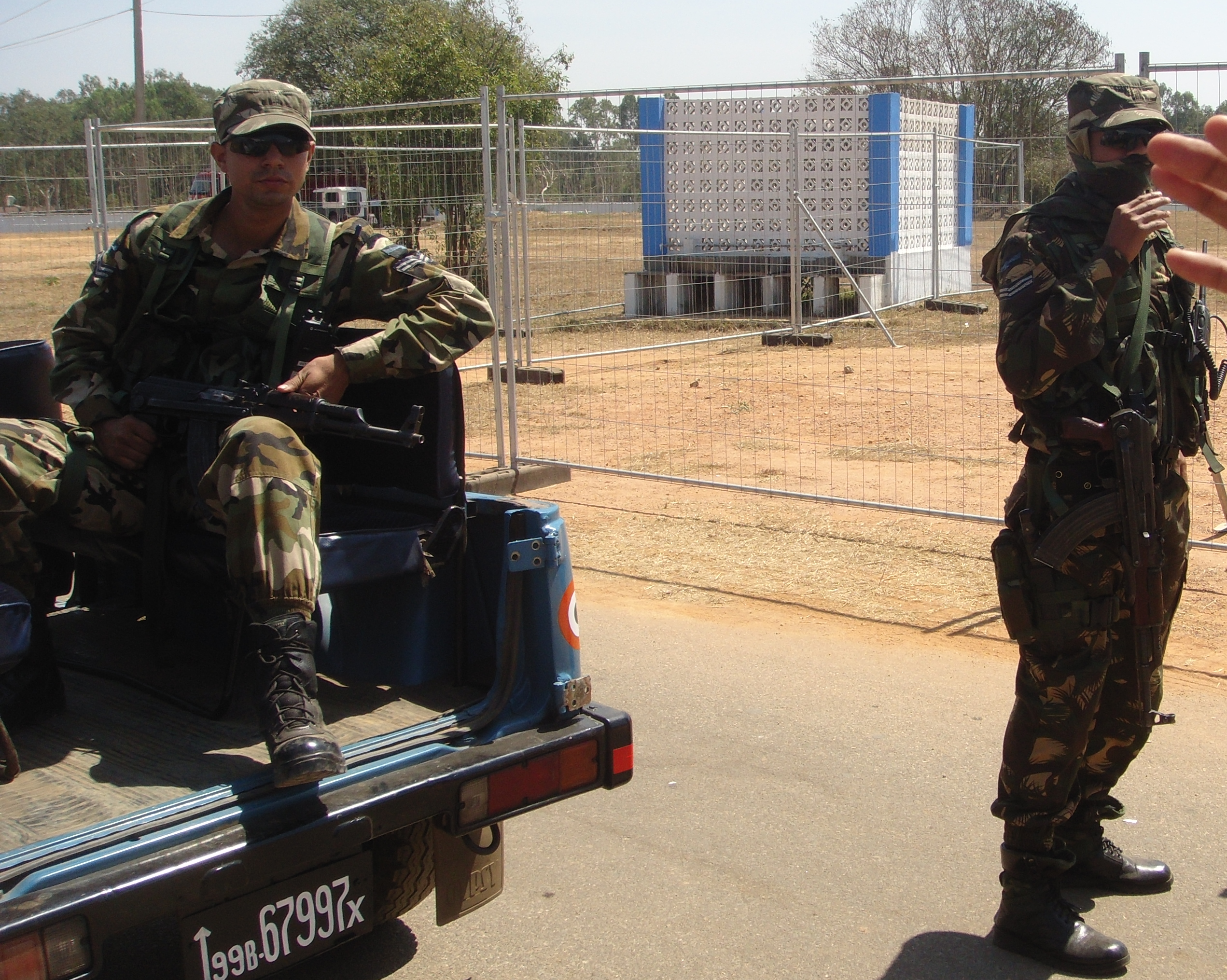
IAF Garud Commandos at Aero India 2011

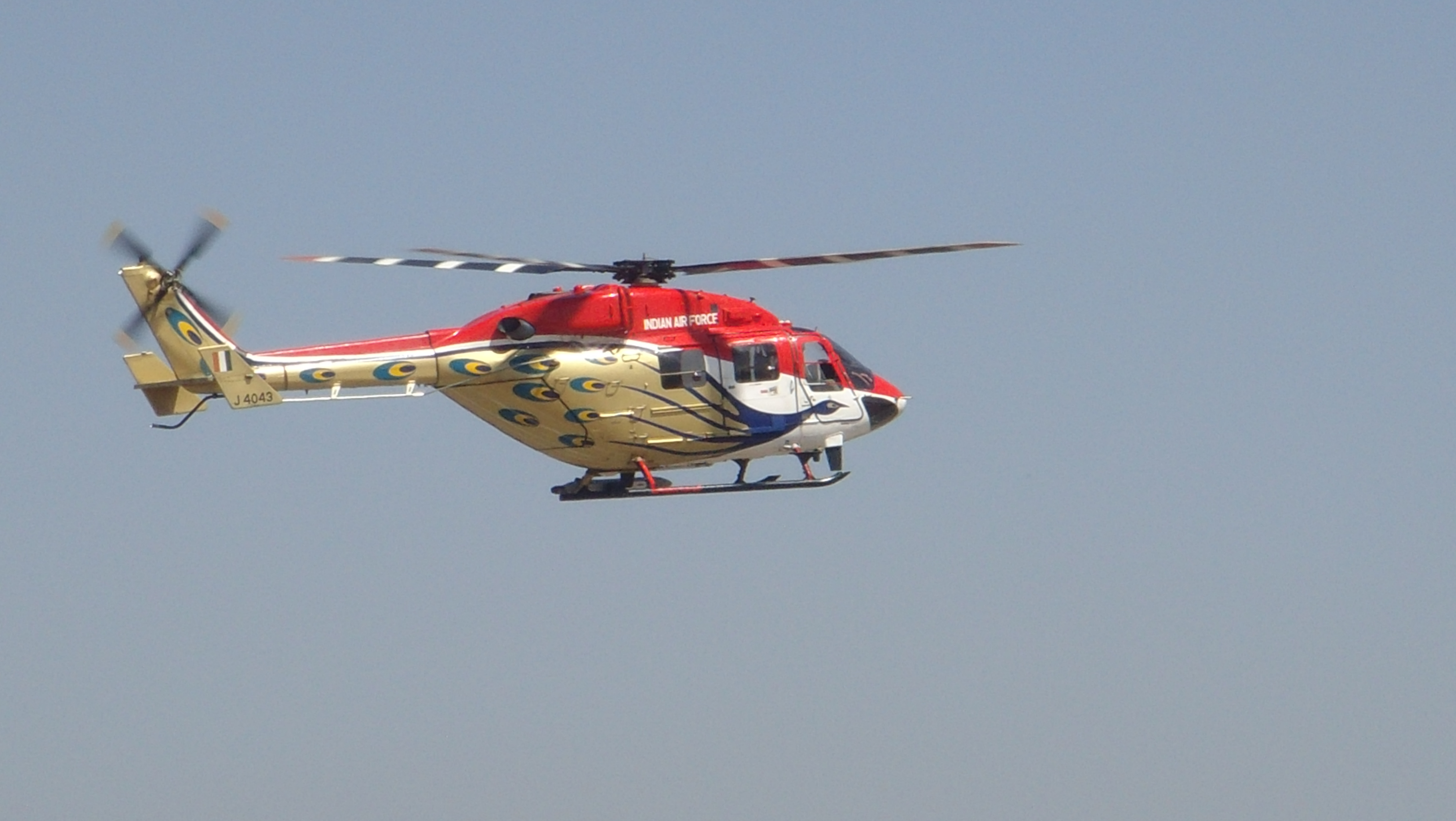
HAL Dhruv of Sarang display team at Aero India 2011

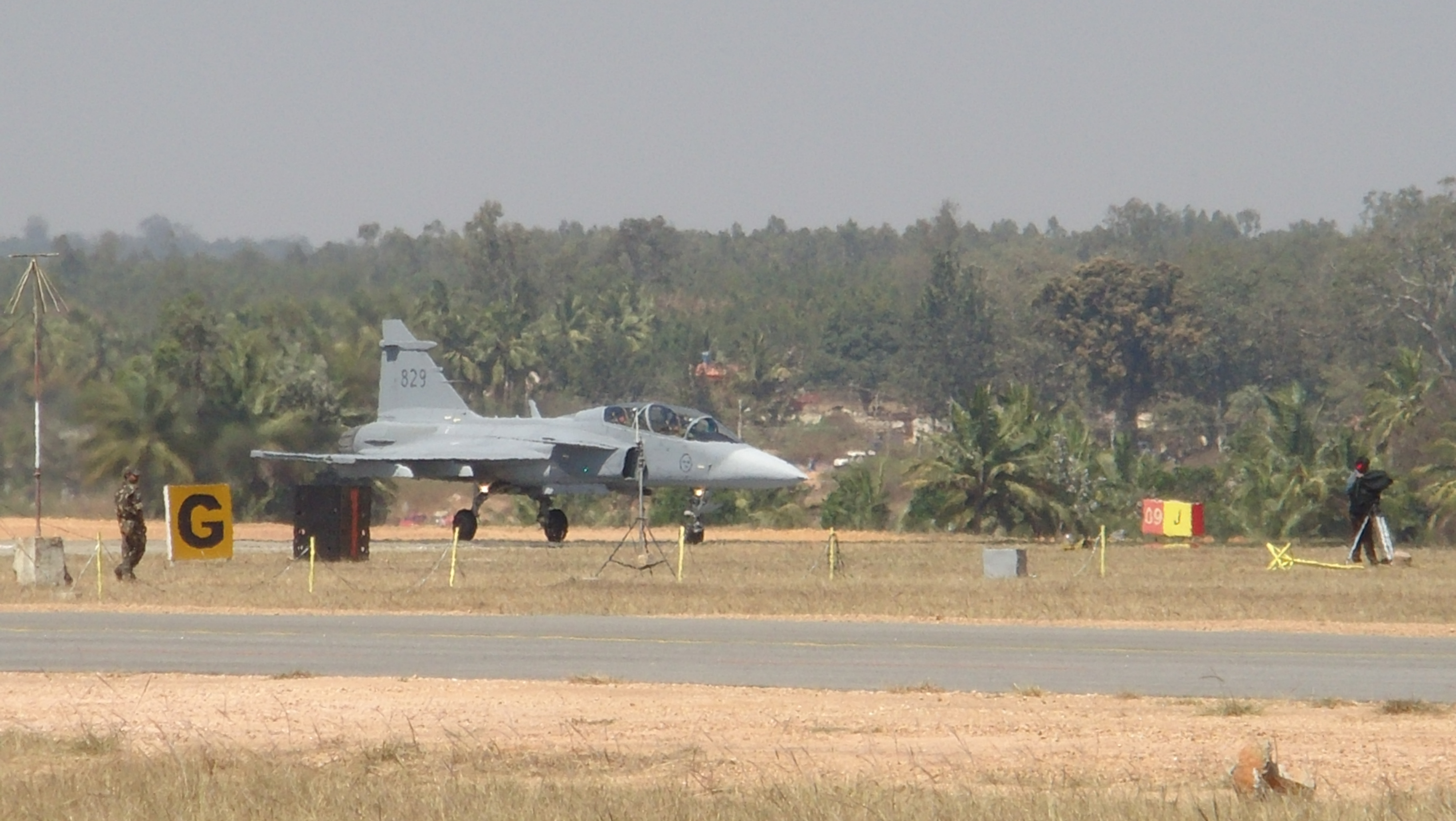
A Swedish Air Force Saab Gripen at Aero India 2011

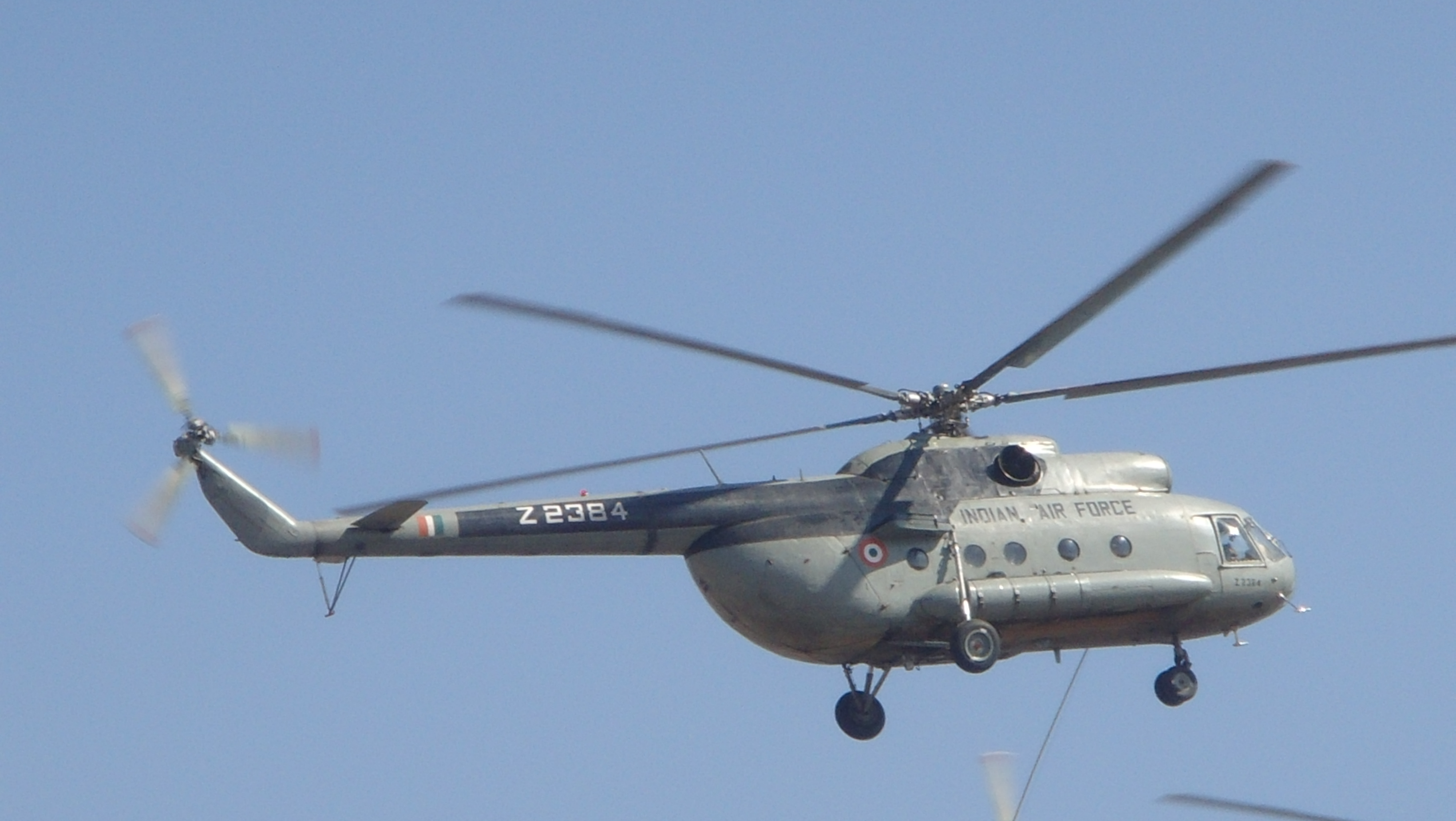
A Mil Mi-8 at Aero India 2011

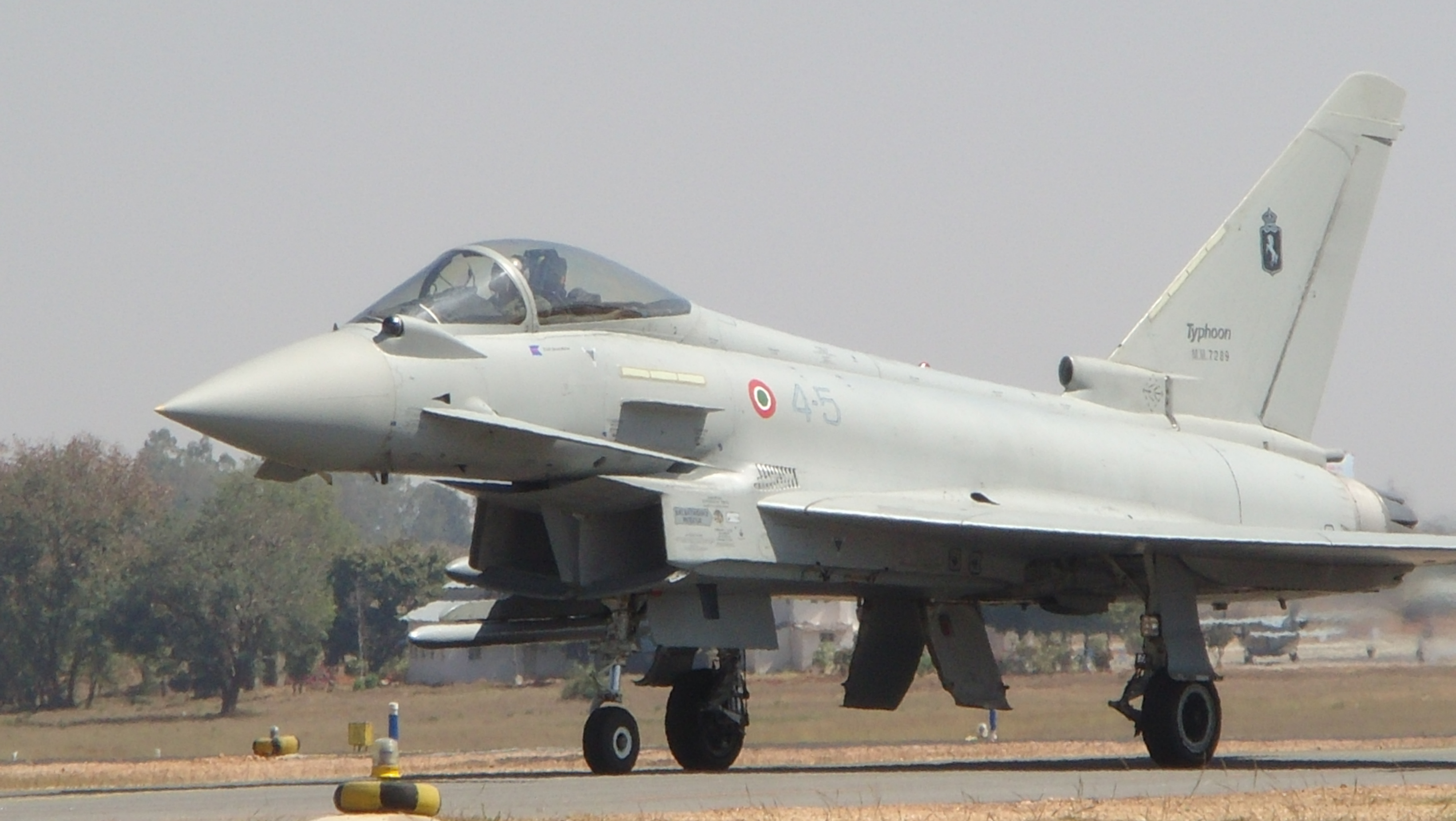
A Eurofighter Typhoon at Aero India 2011

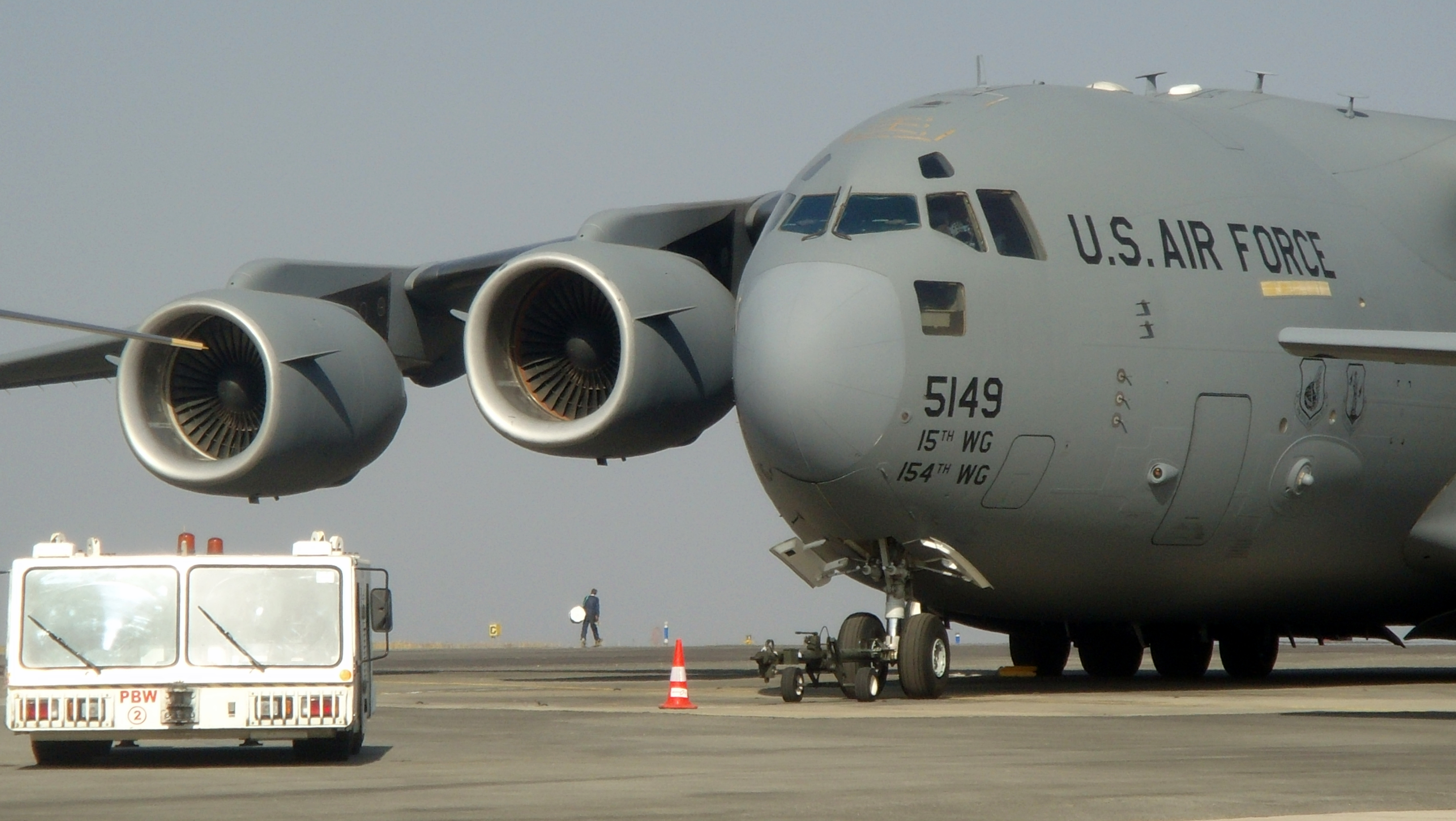
A USAF C-17 Globemaster III at Aero India 2013

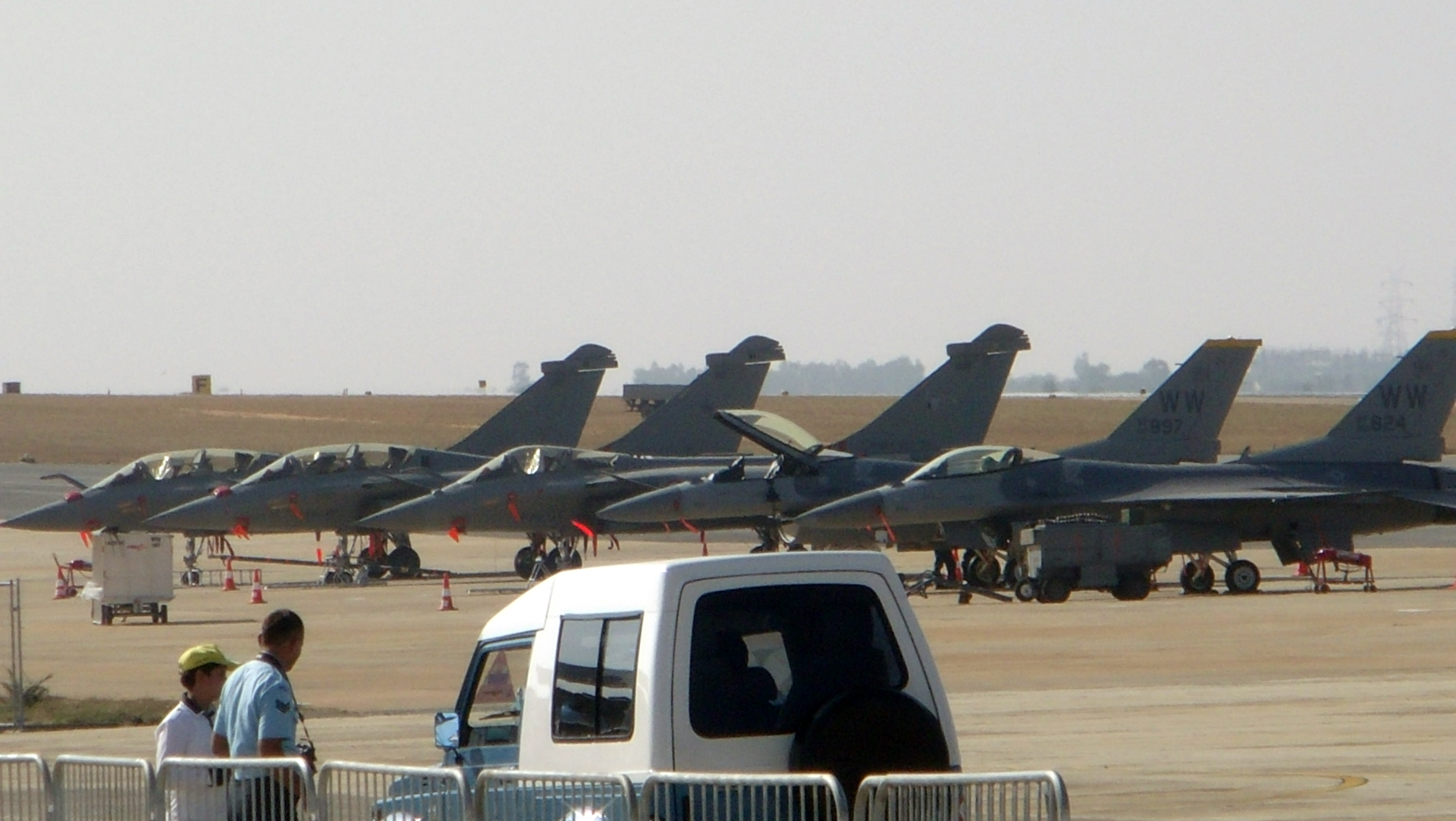
Two Dassault Rafale B, One Rafale C and two USAF F-16 C at Aero India 2013

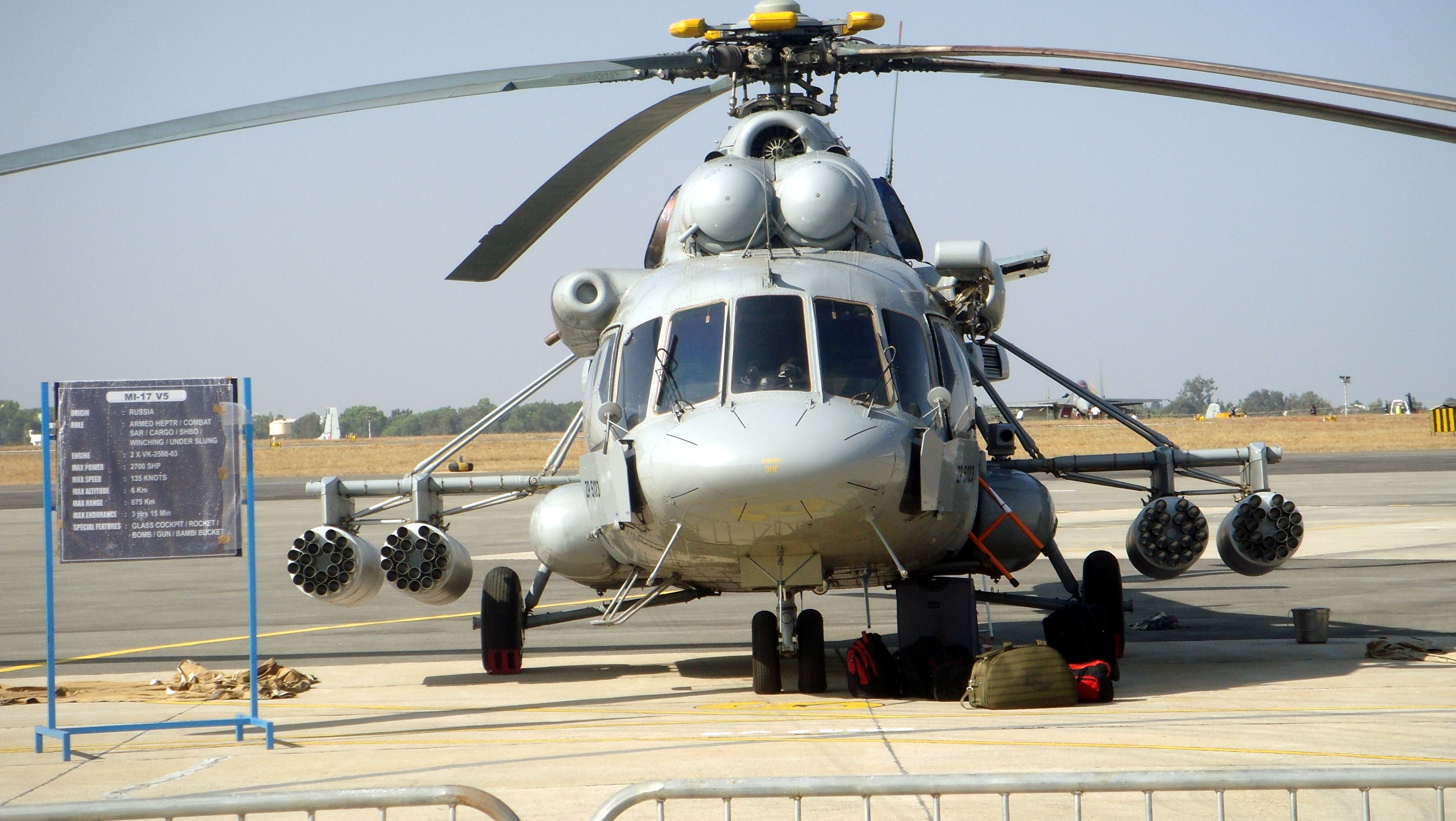
IAF Mi 17 V5 at Aero India 2013

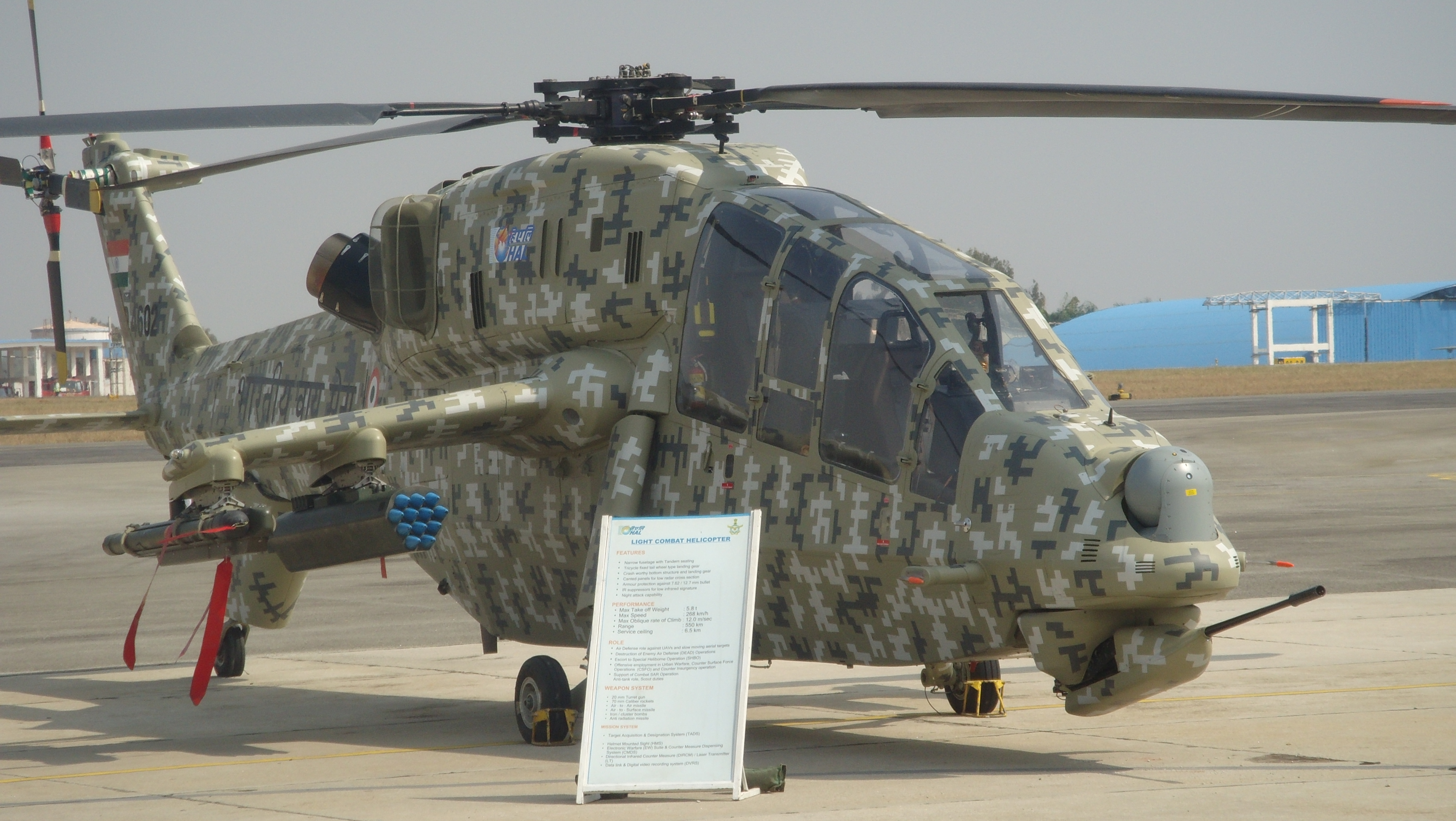
HAL Light Combat Helicopter (LCH) in digital camouflage at Aero India 2013, static display

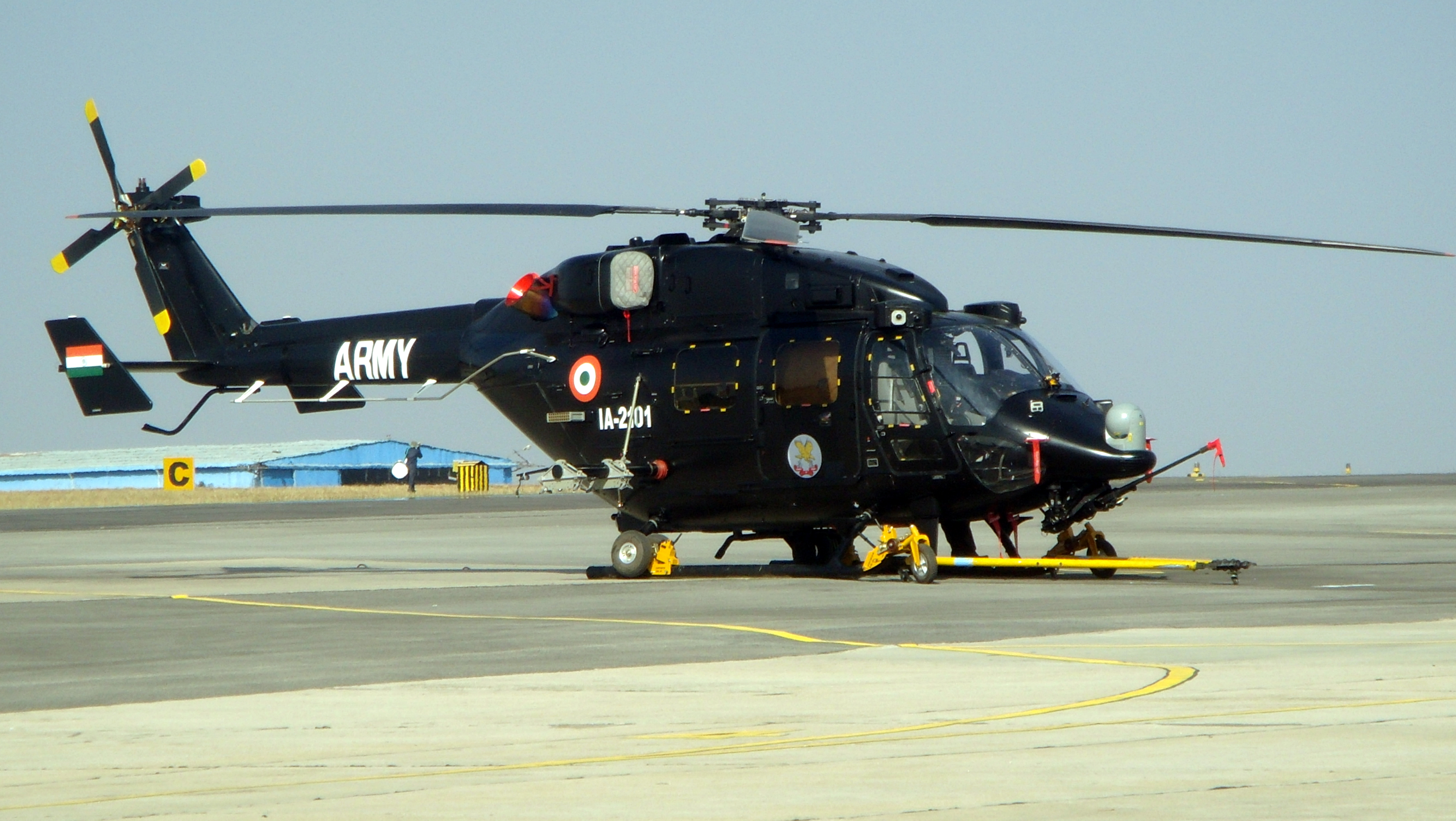
A HAL Rudra at Aero India 2013

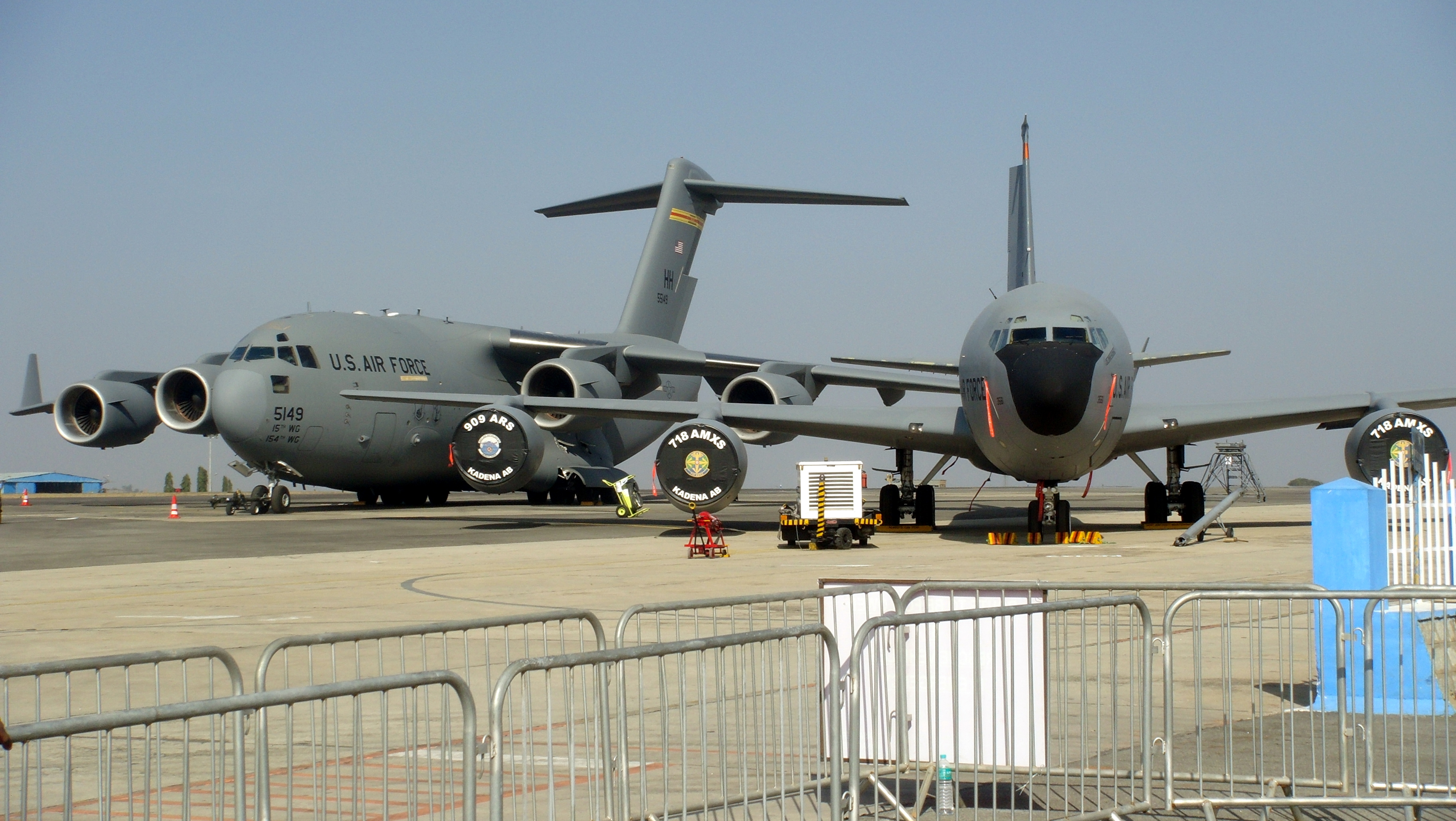
Boeing KC-135 Stratotanker (right) and C-17 Globemaster III (left) Aero India 2013

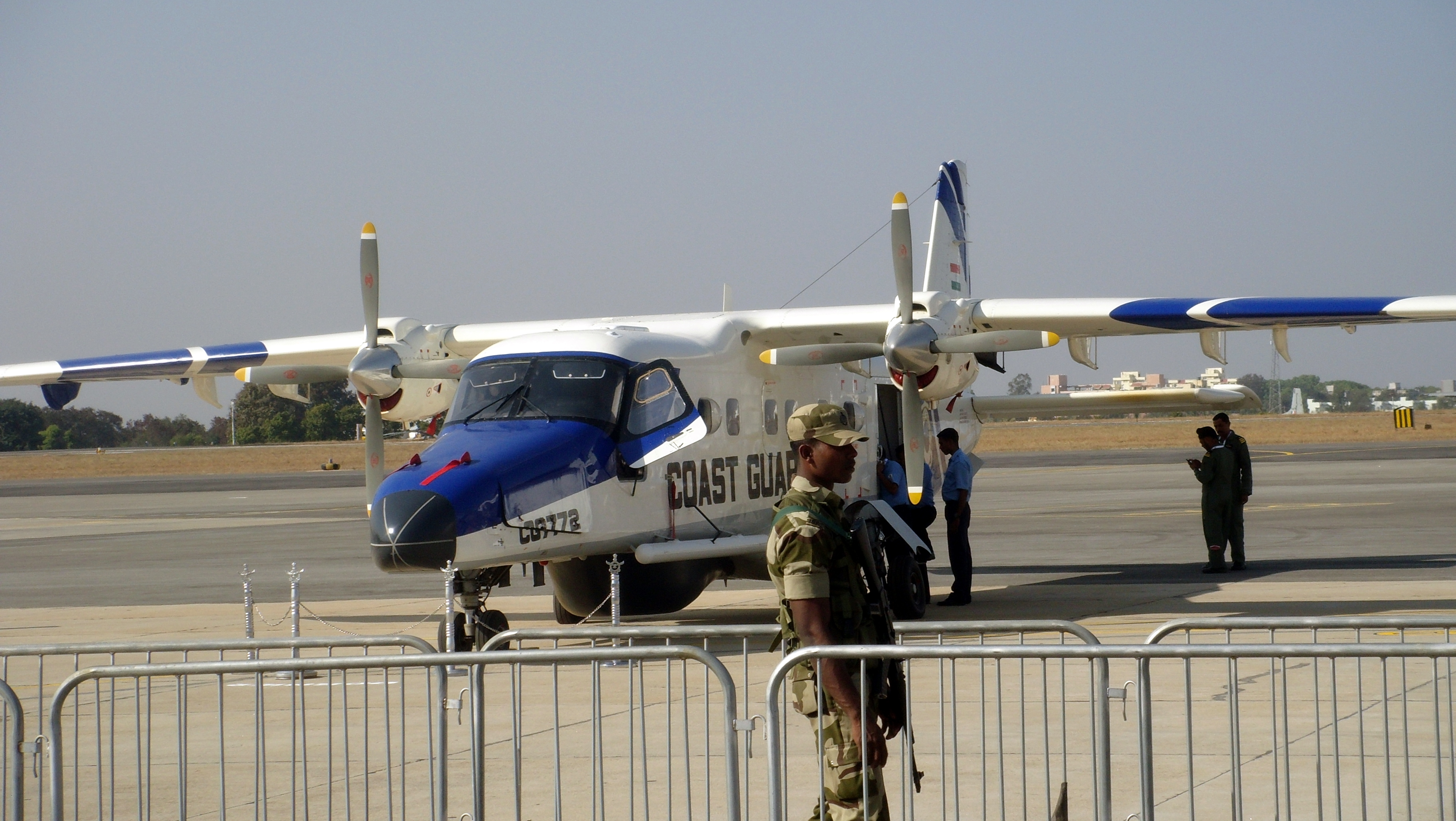
Indian Coast Guard Dornier 228 at Aero India 2013

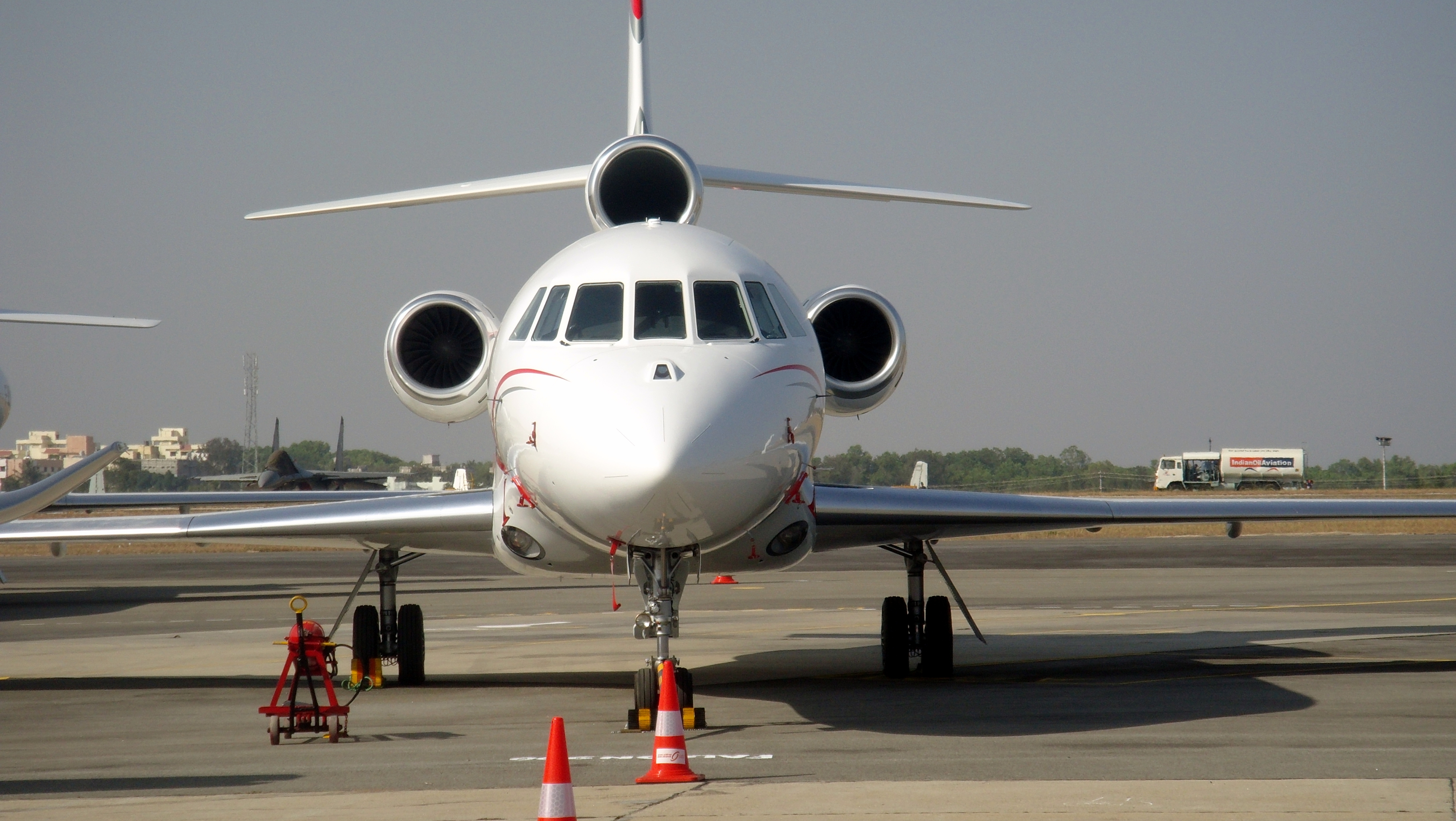
French Dassault Falcon 900LX at Aero India 2013

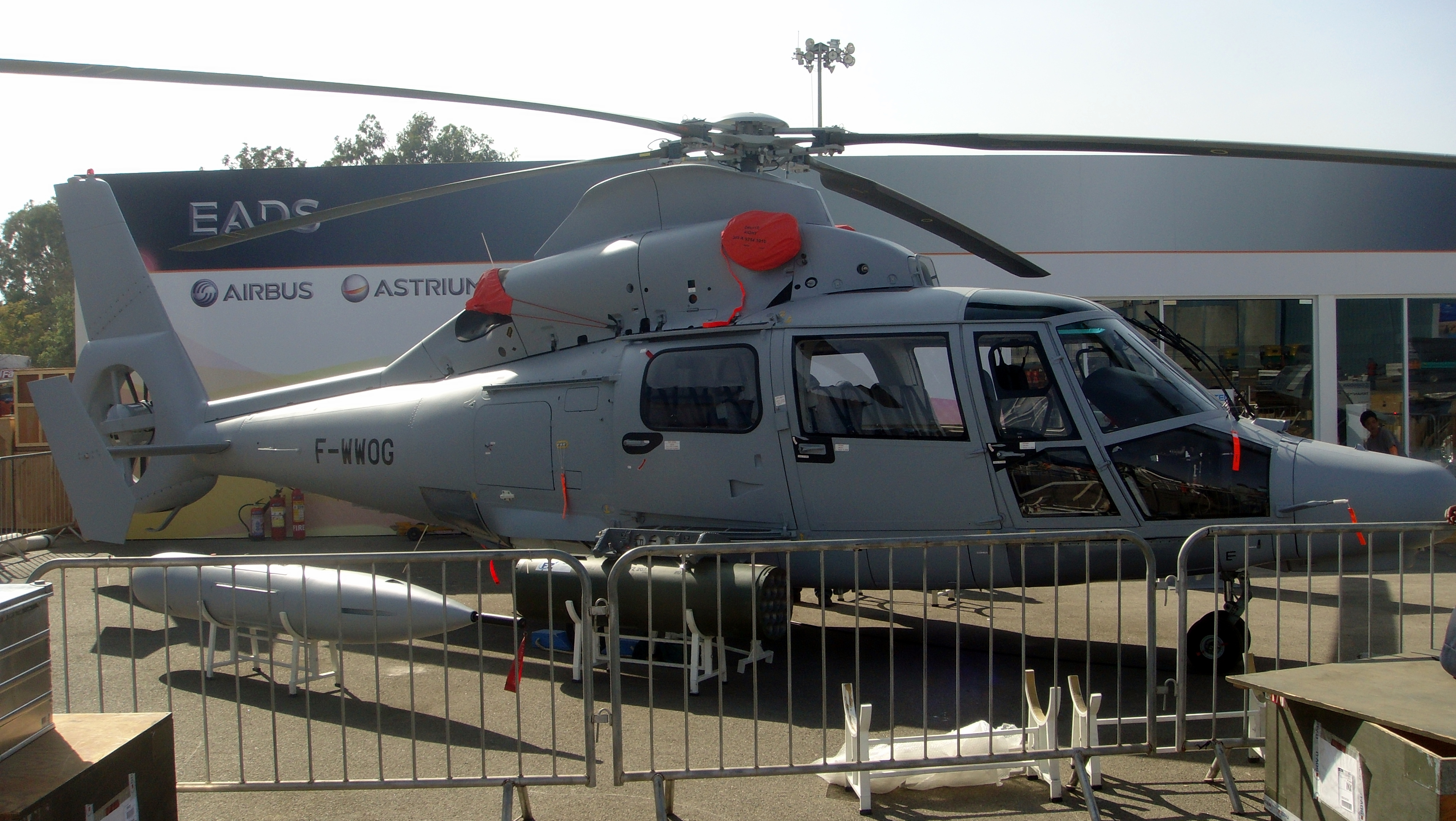
Eurocopter AS365 Dauphin at Aero India 2013

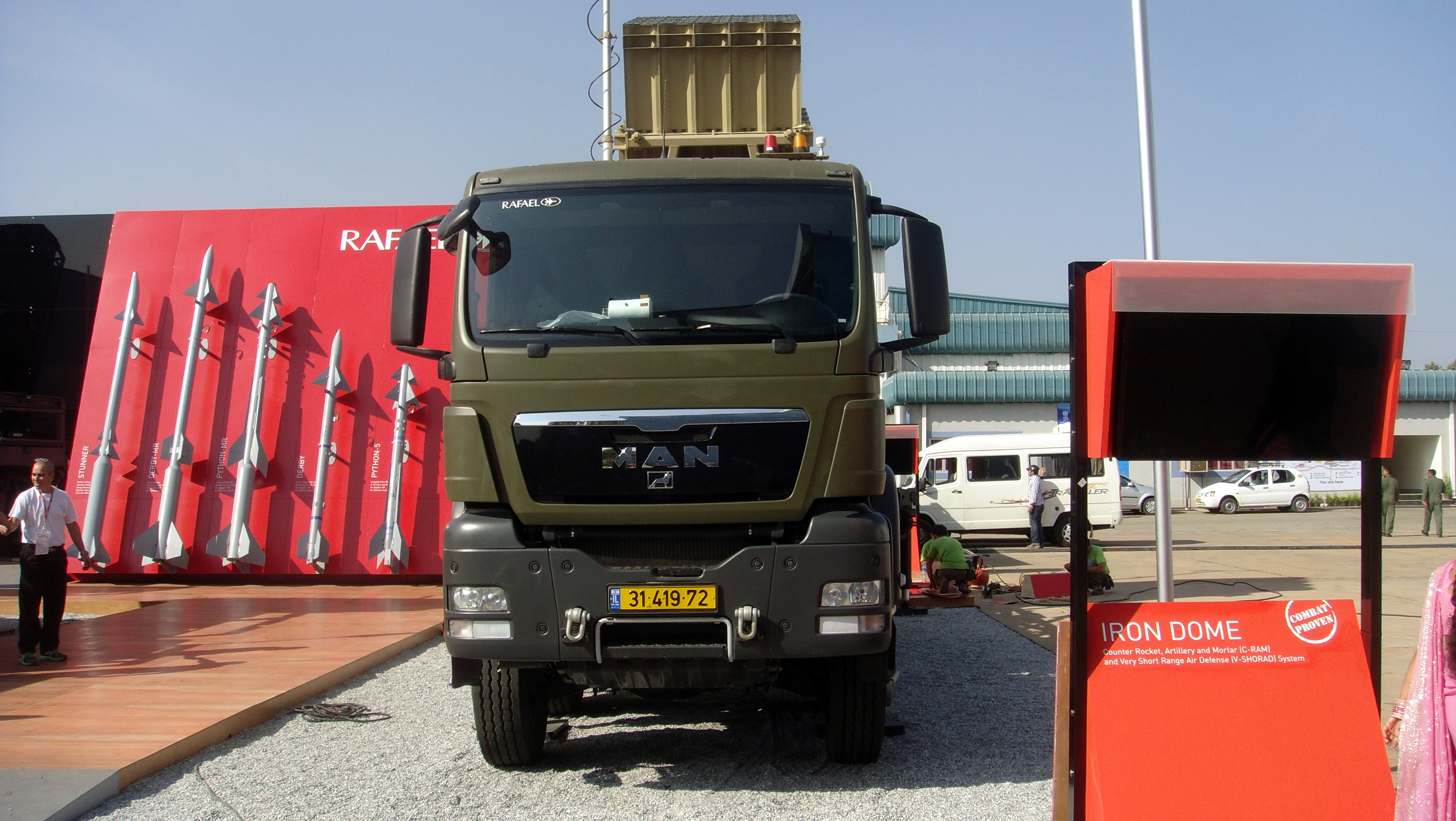
Rafael Very Short Range Air Defense (V-SHORAD) system at Aero India 2013

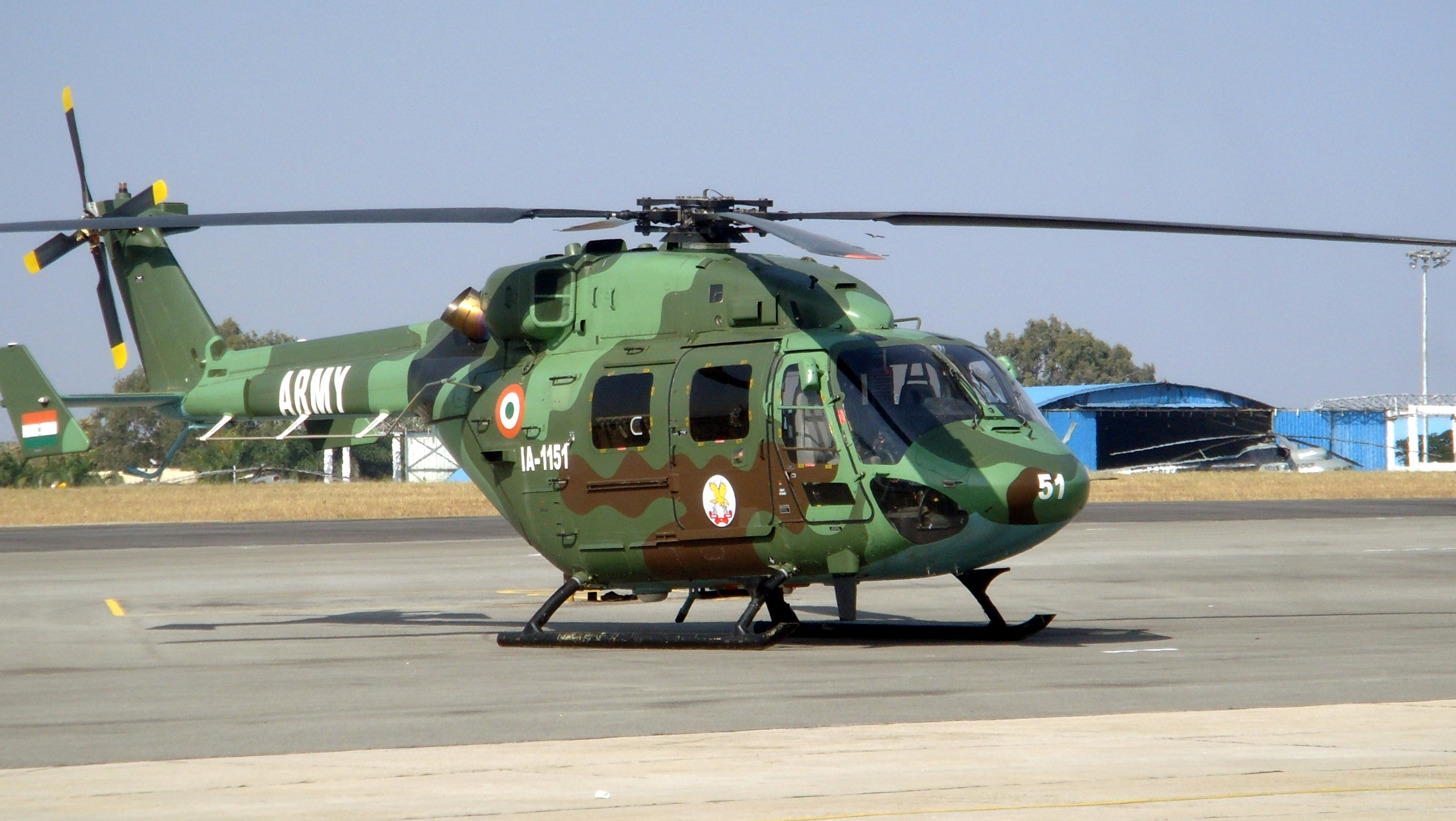
An Indian Army Dhruv at Aero India 2013

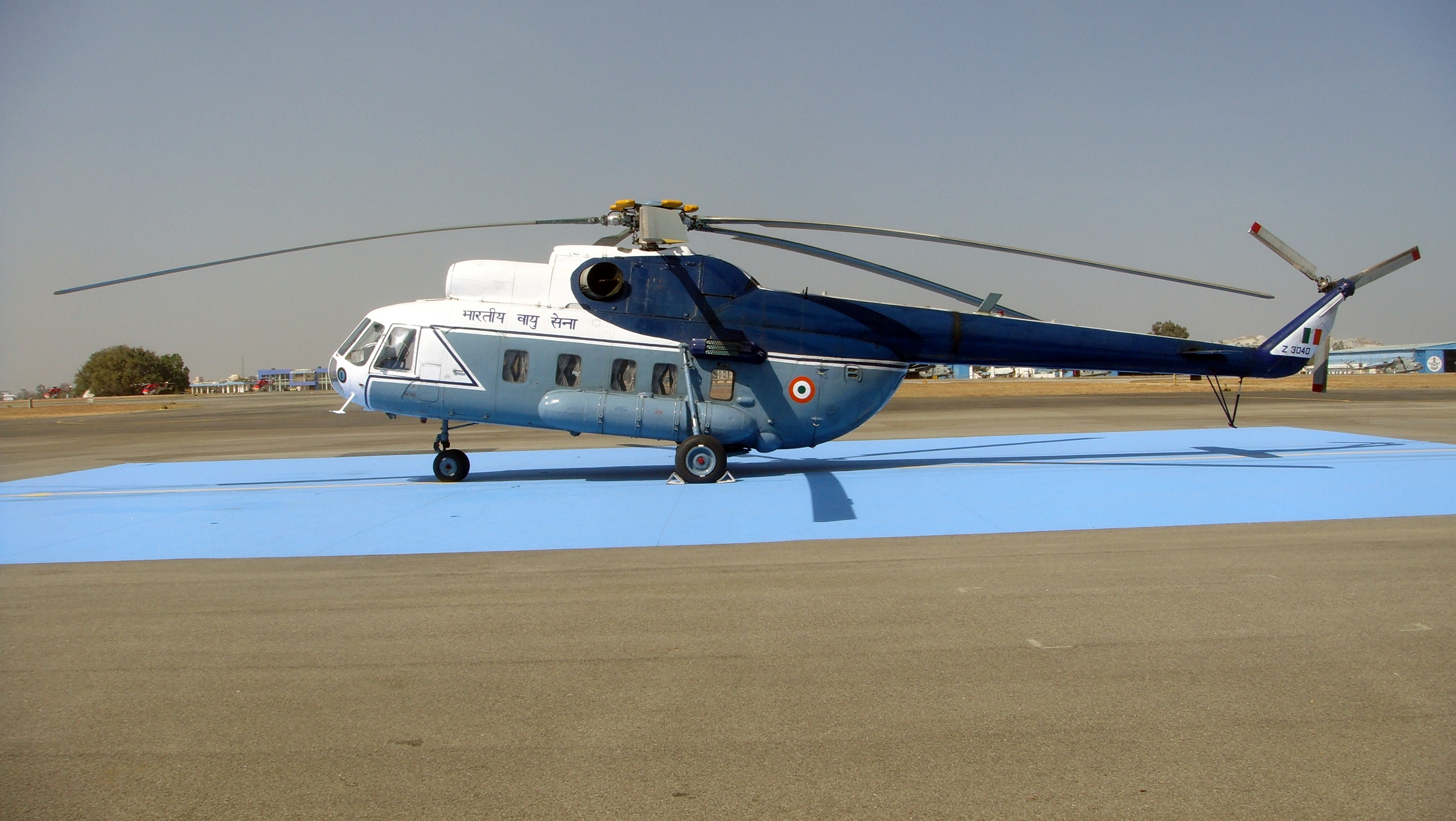
An IAF Mi-8 for VIP Transport at Aero India 2013

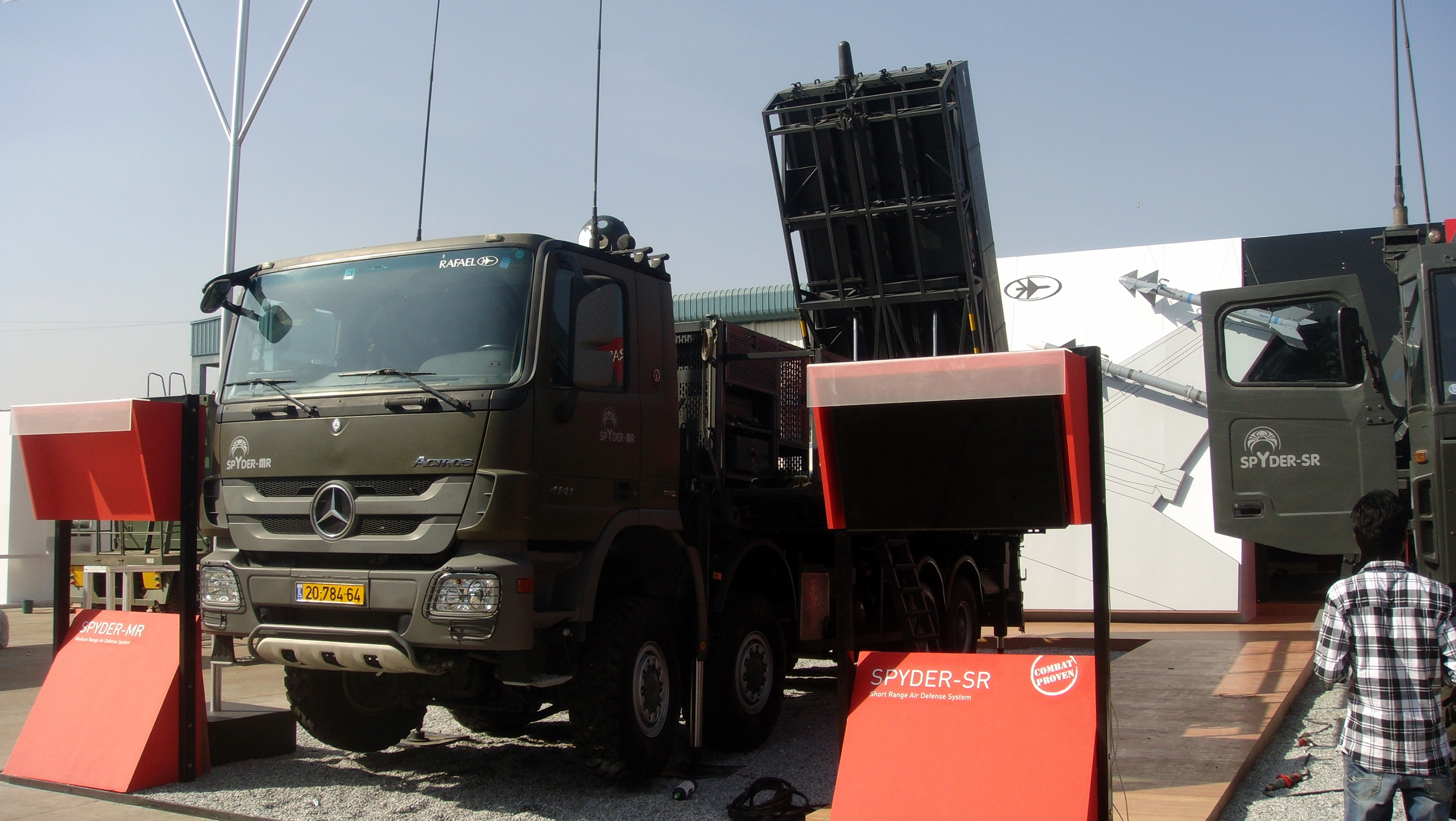
Rafael SPYDER air defence System at Aero India 2013

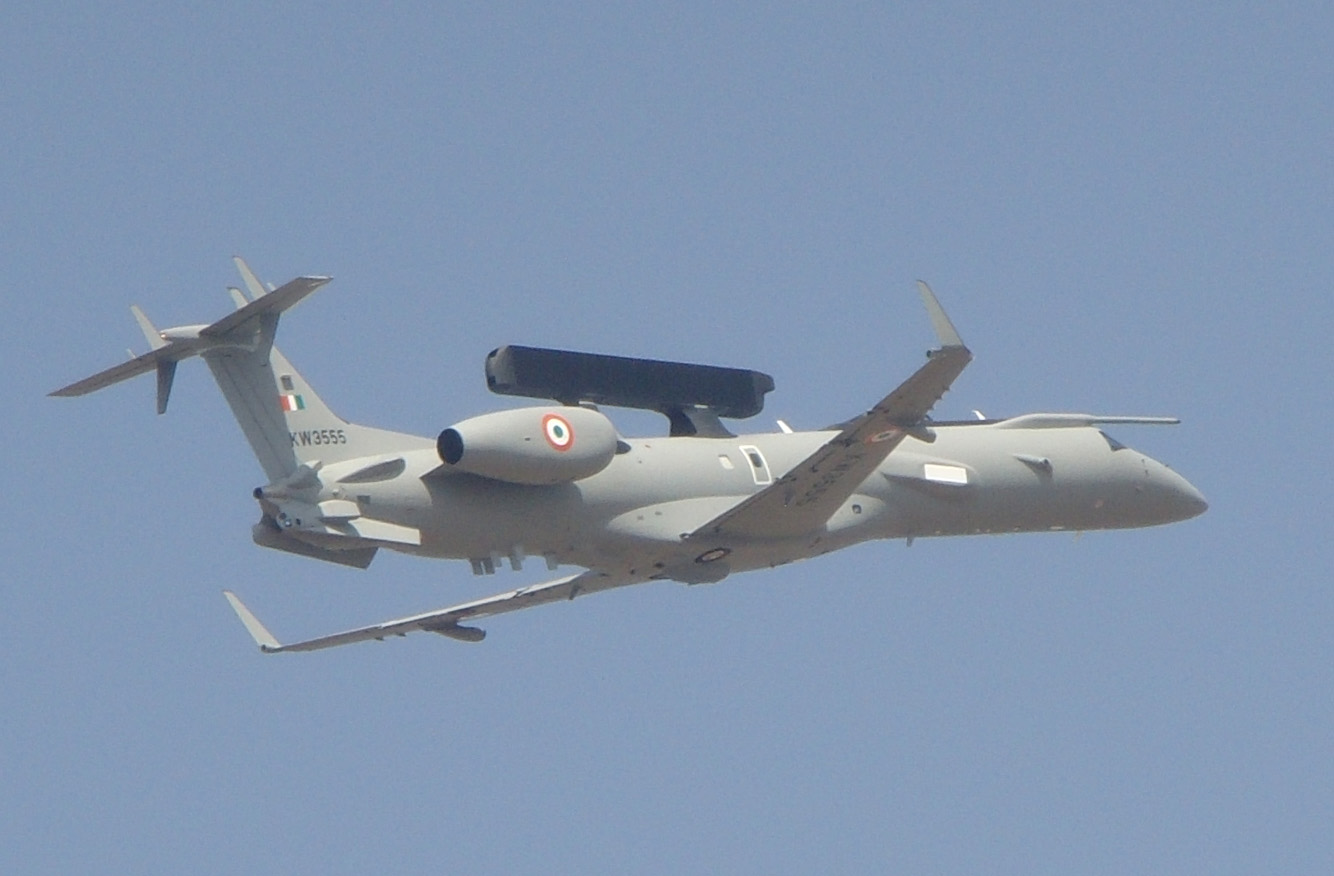
DRDO AEW&CS, on Embraer ERJ 145 as a platform, Fly pass at Aero India 2013

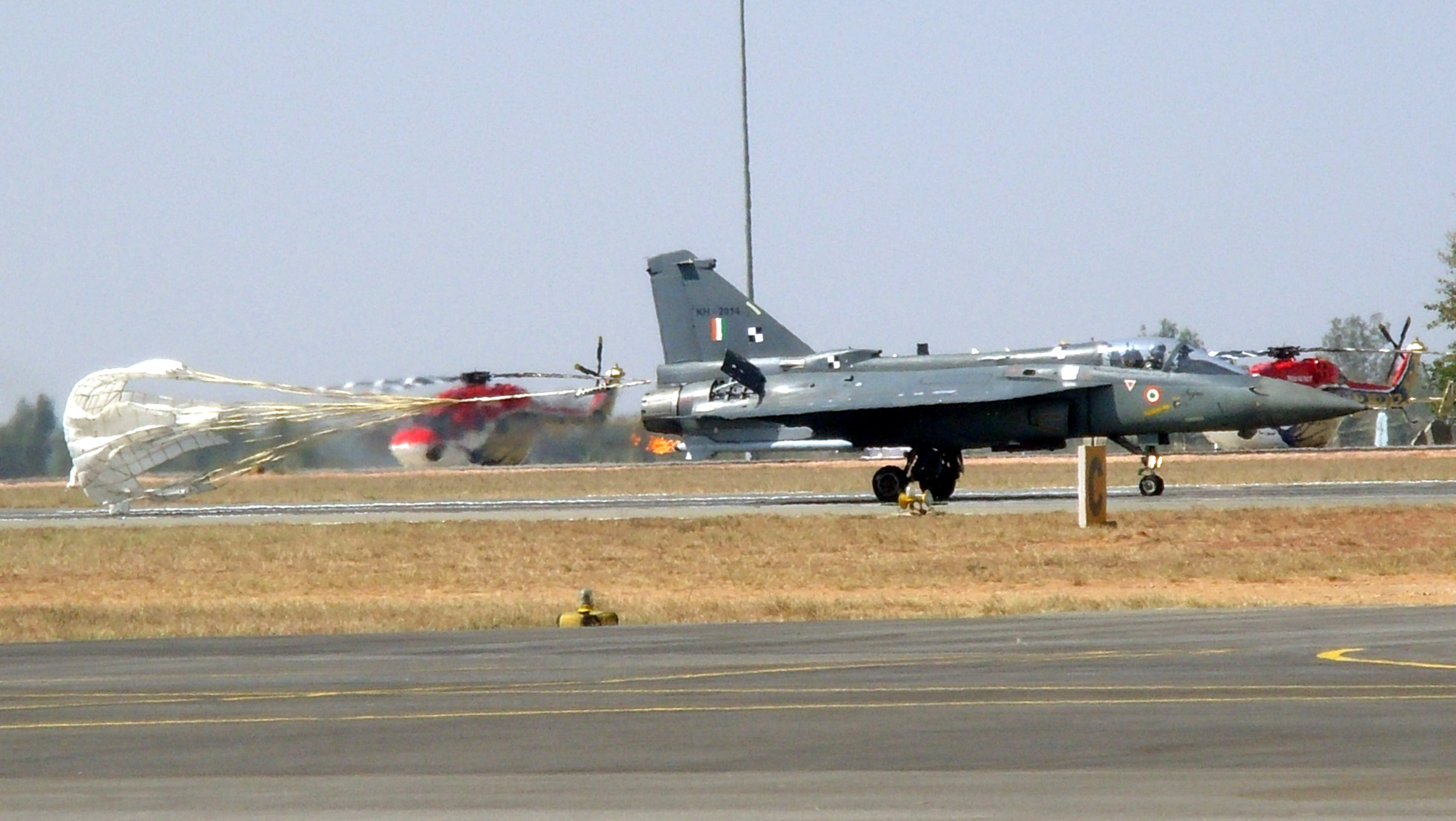
An IAF Tejas landing during Aero India 2013

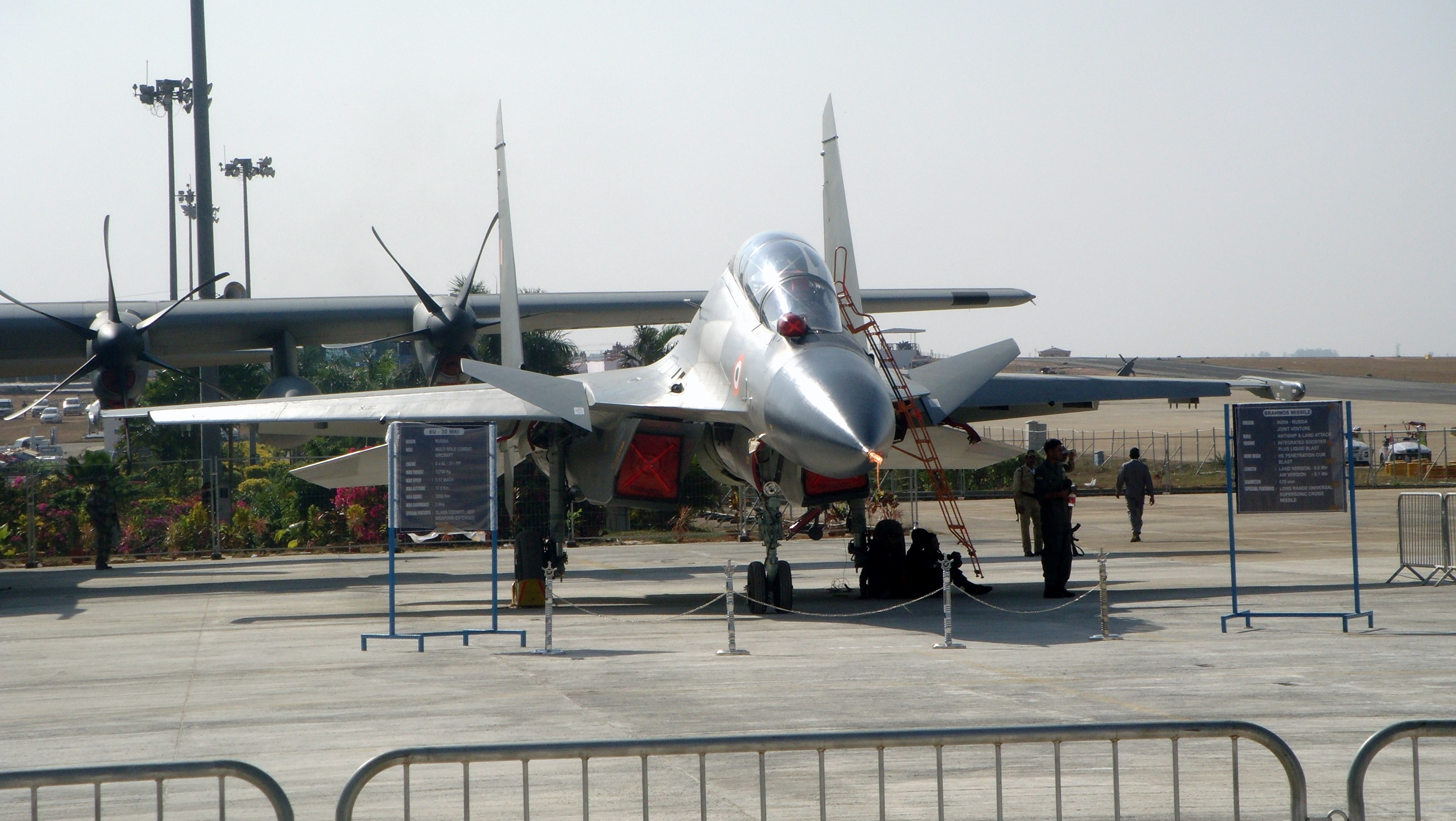
IAF Sukhoi 30 MKI with tilted forward horizontal stabilisers (Canards) at static display Aero India 2013

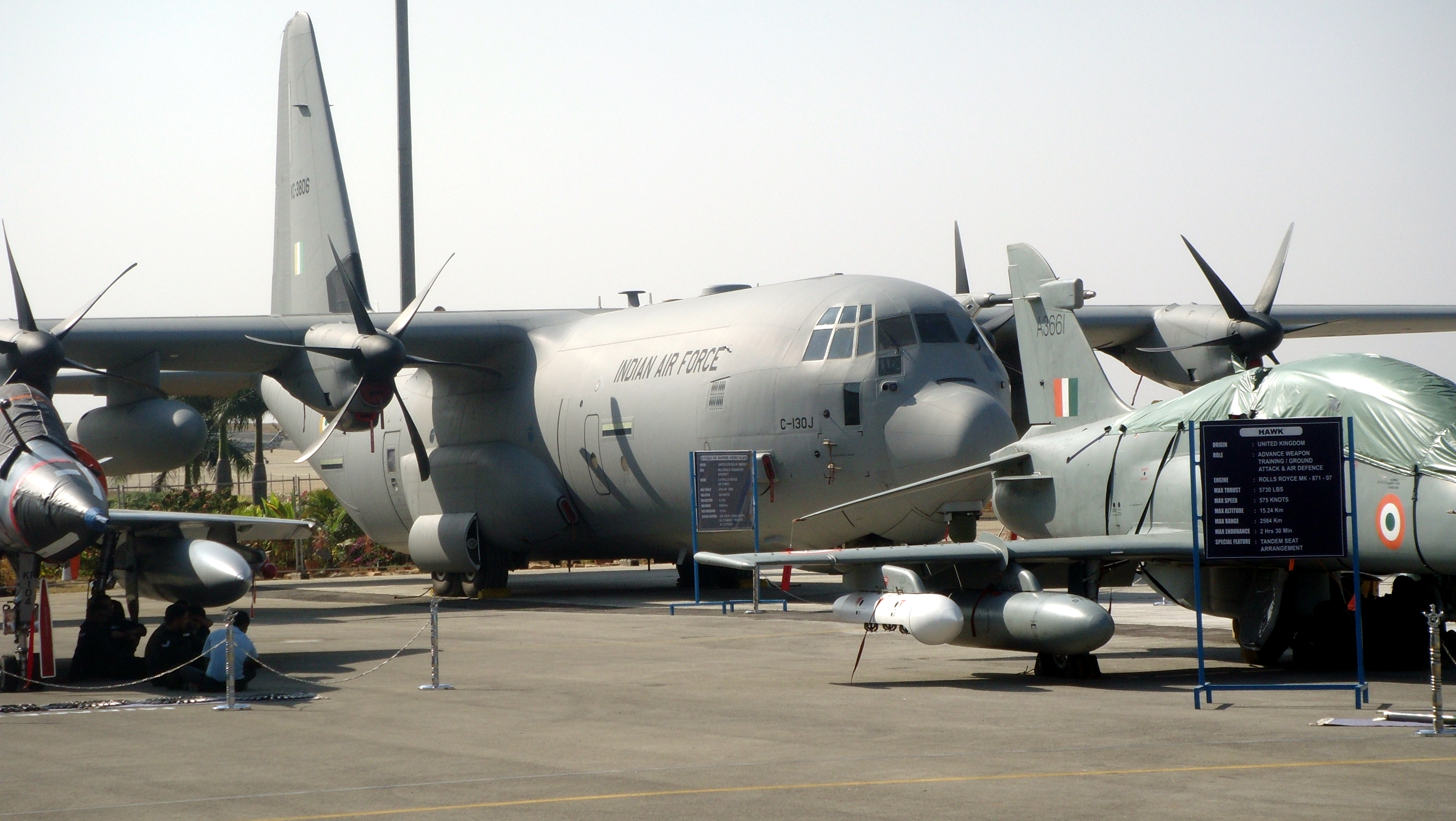
An IAF C-130J Super Hercules at Aero India 2013

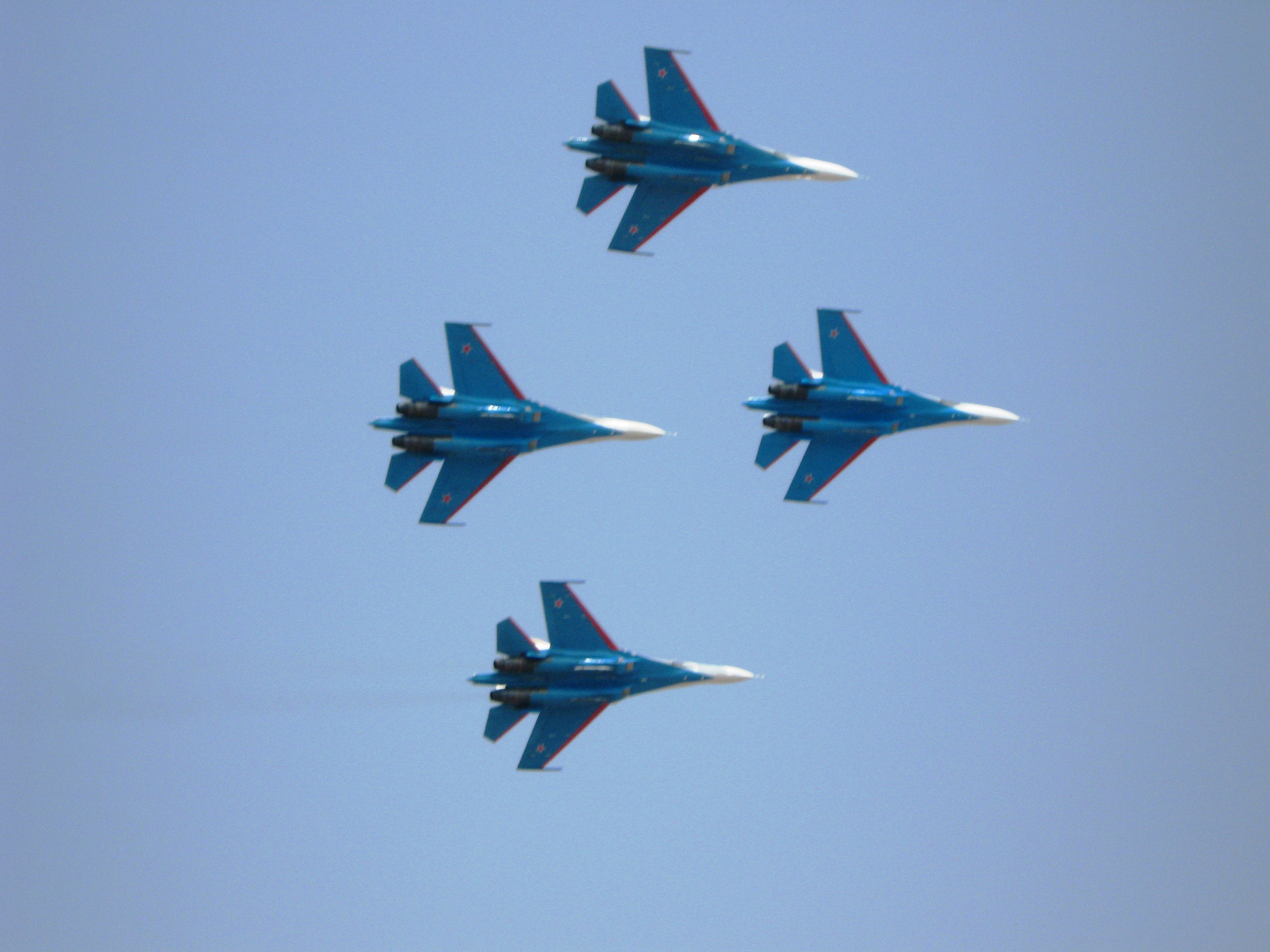
4 Sukhoi Su-27Ps of the Russian Knights performing at Aero India 2013

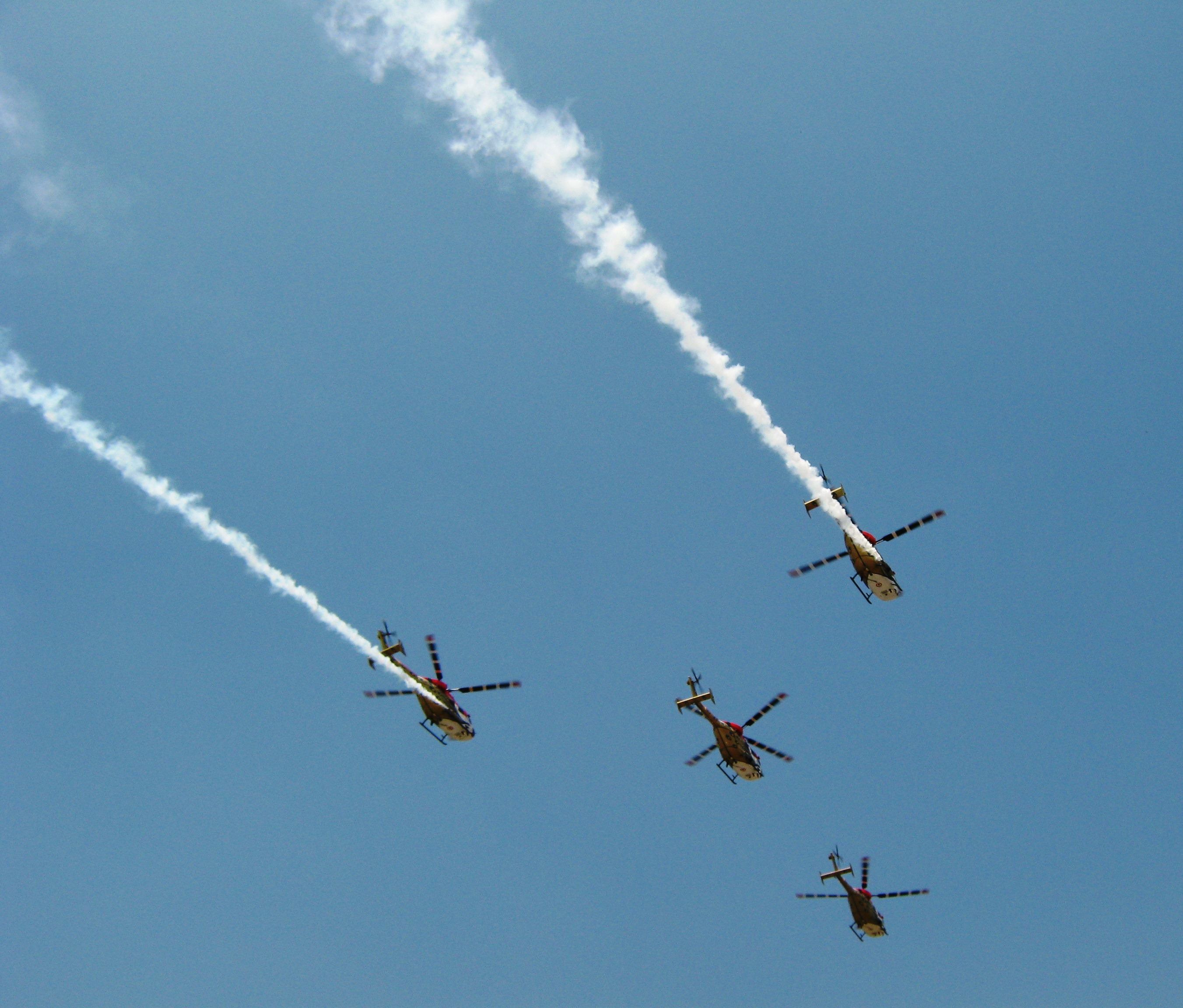
Sarang display team of IAF at Aero India 2013

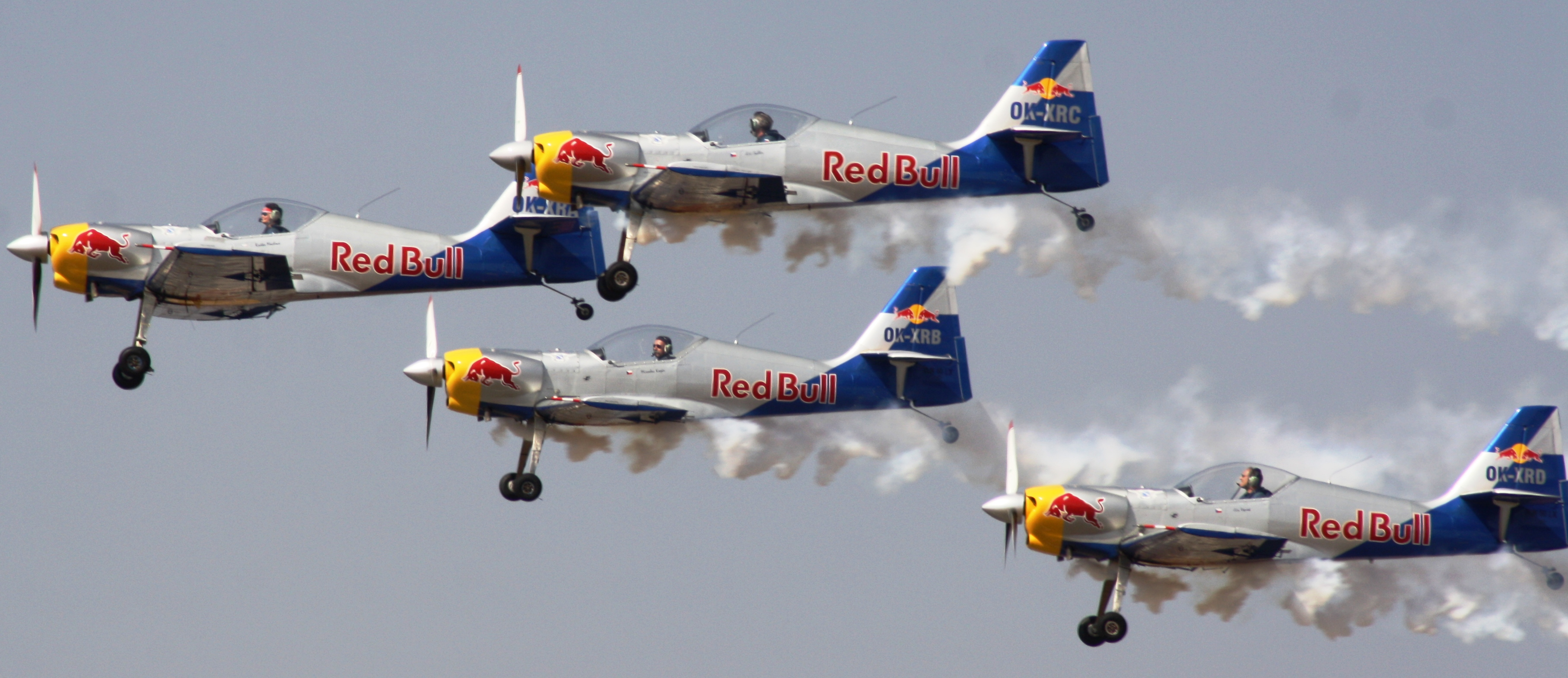
Zlín Z-50s of The Flying Bulls aerobatics team at Aero India 2013

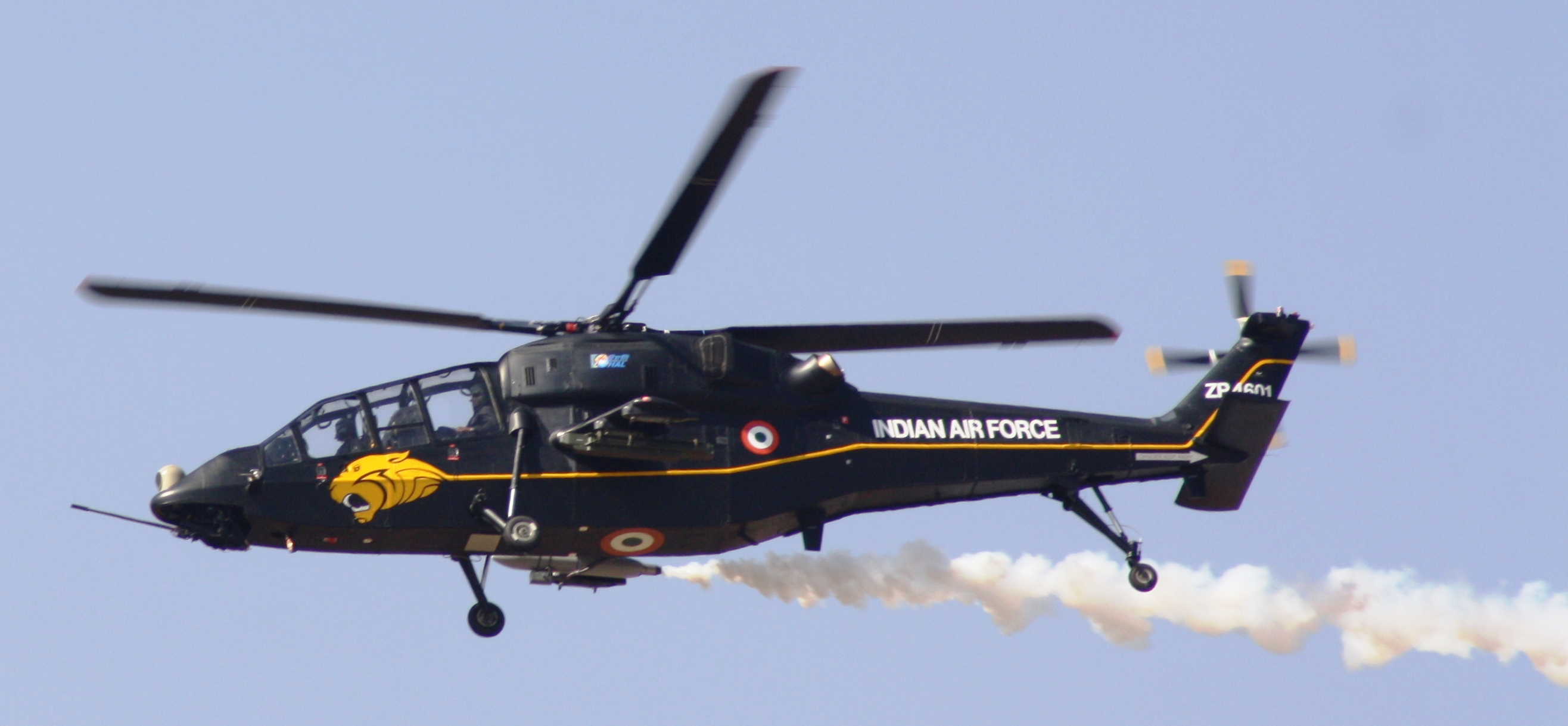
HAL Light Combat Helicopter at Aero India 2013

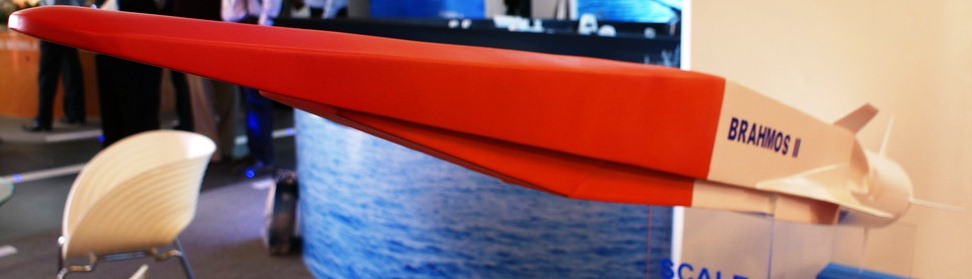
A scaled-down model of Brahmos-II at Aero India 2013

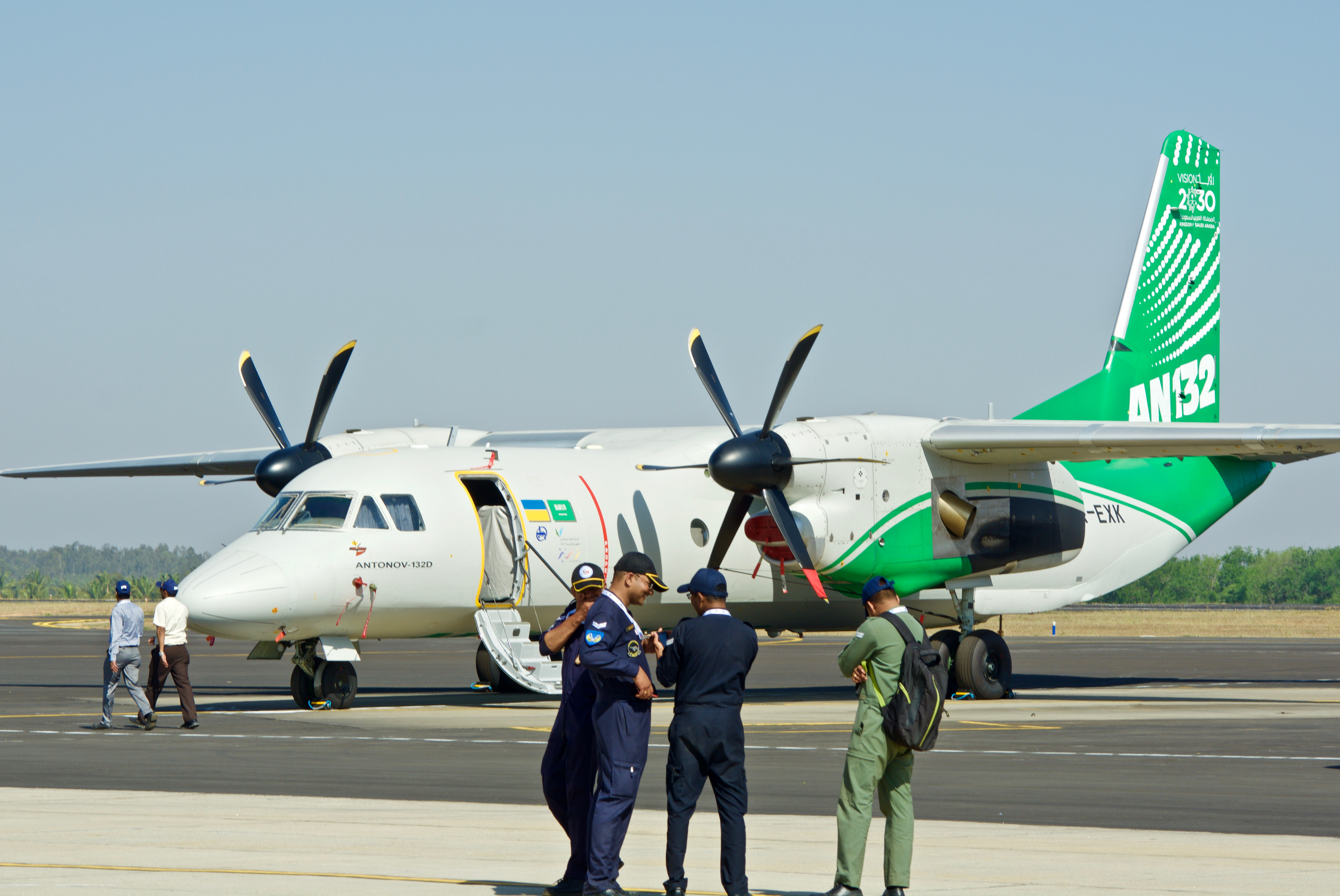
Antonov An132D seen at Aero India 2019

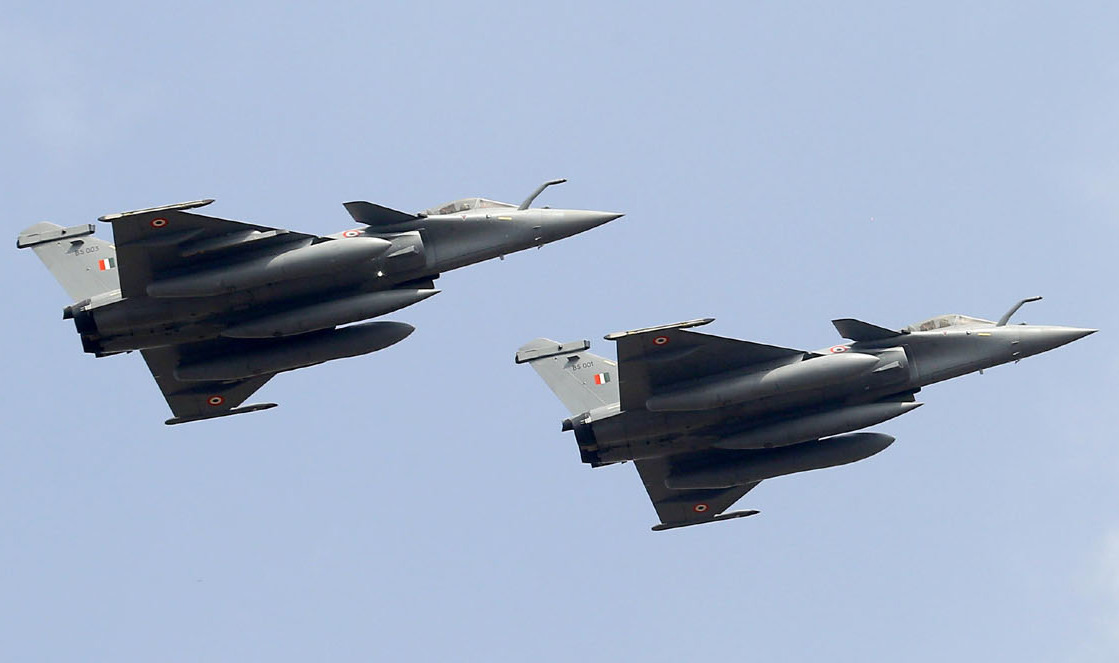
Dassault Rafale perform a flyby at Aero India 2021

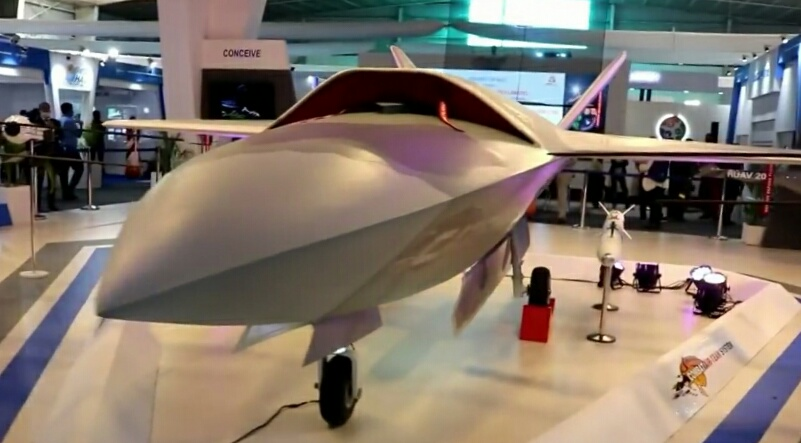
A model of HAL CATS Warrior displayed at Aero India 2021

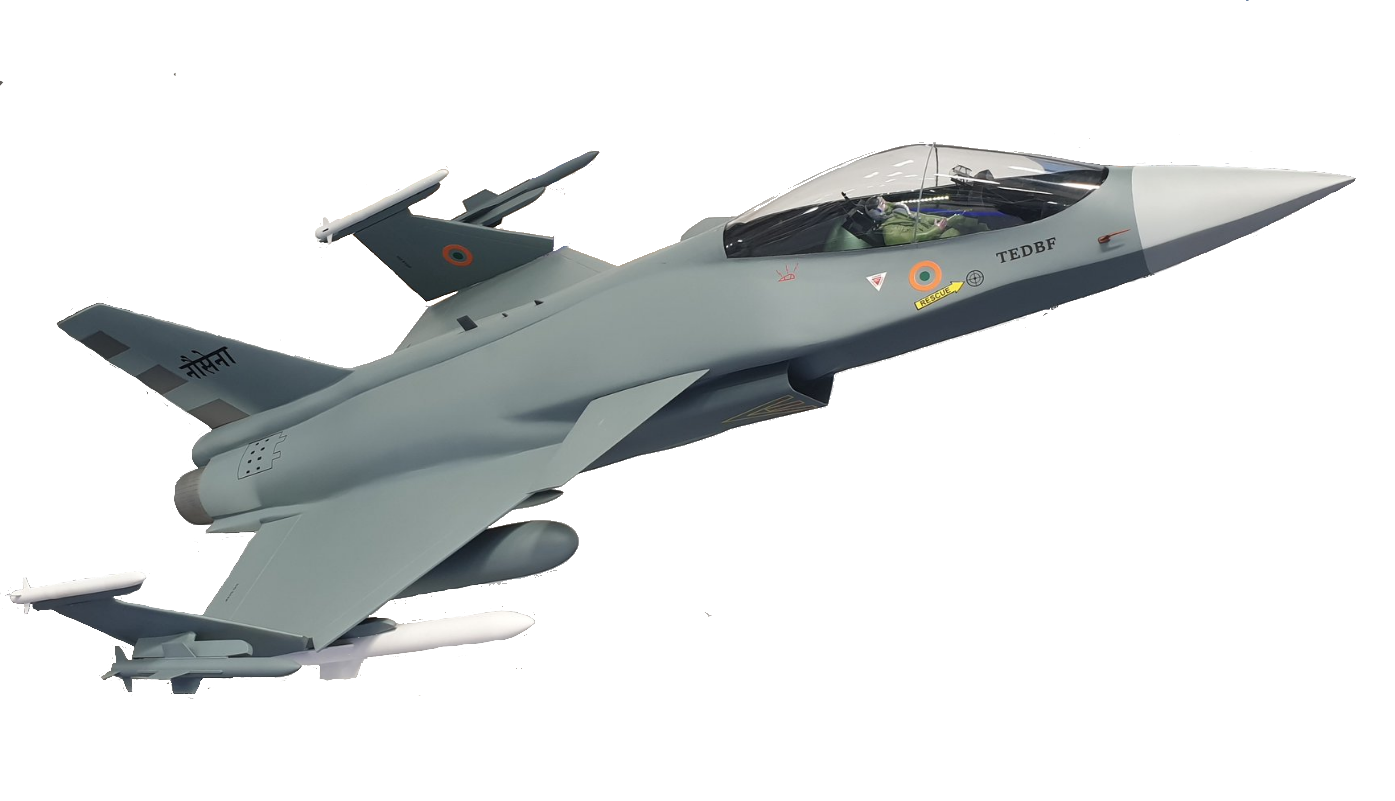
HAL TEDBF scale model at Aero India 2021

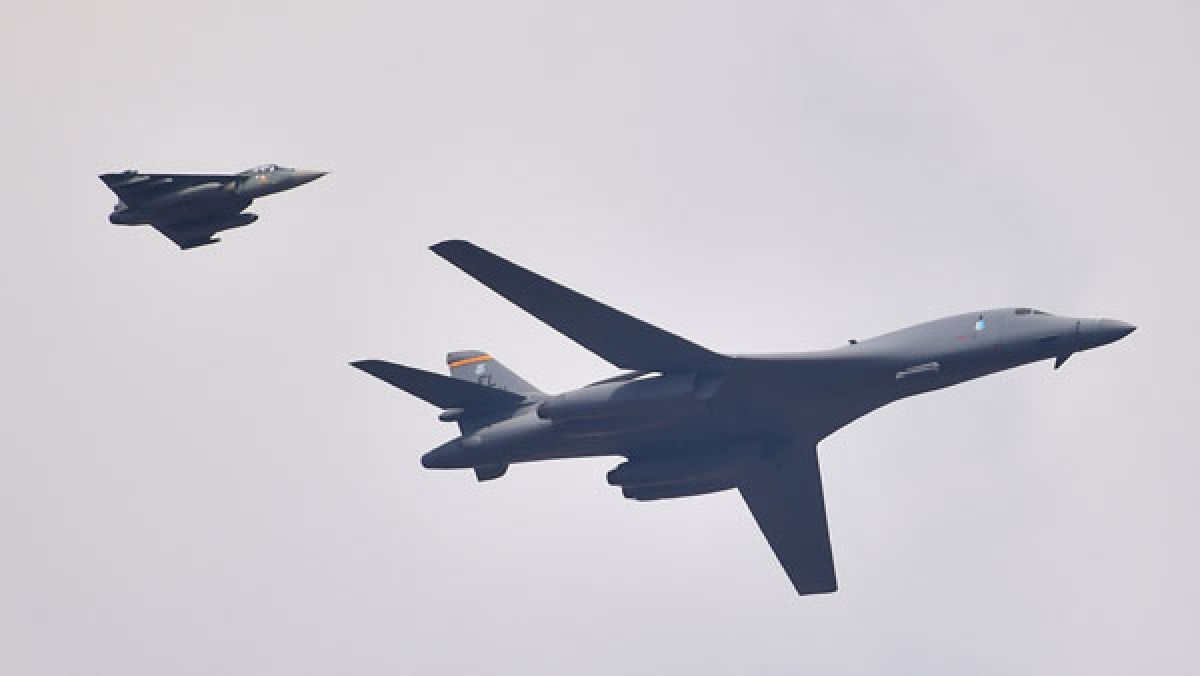
Tejas flying with B-1B

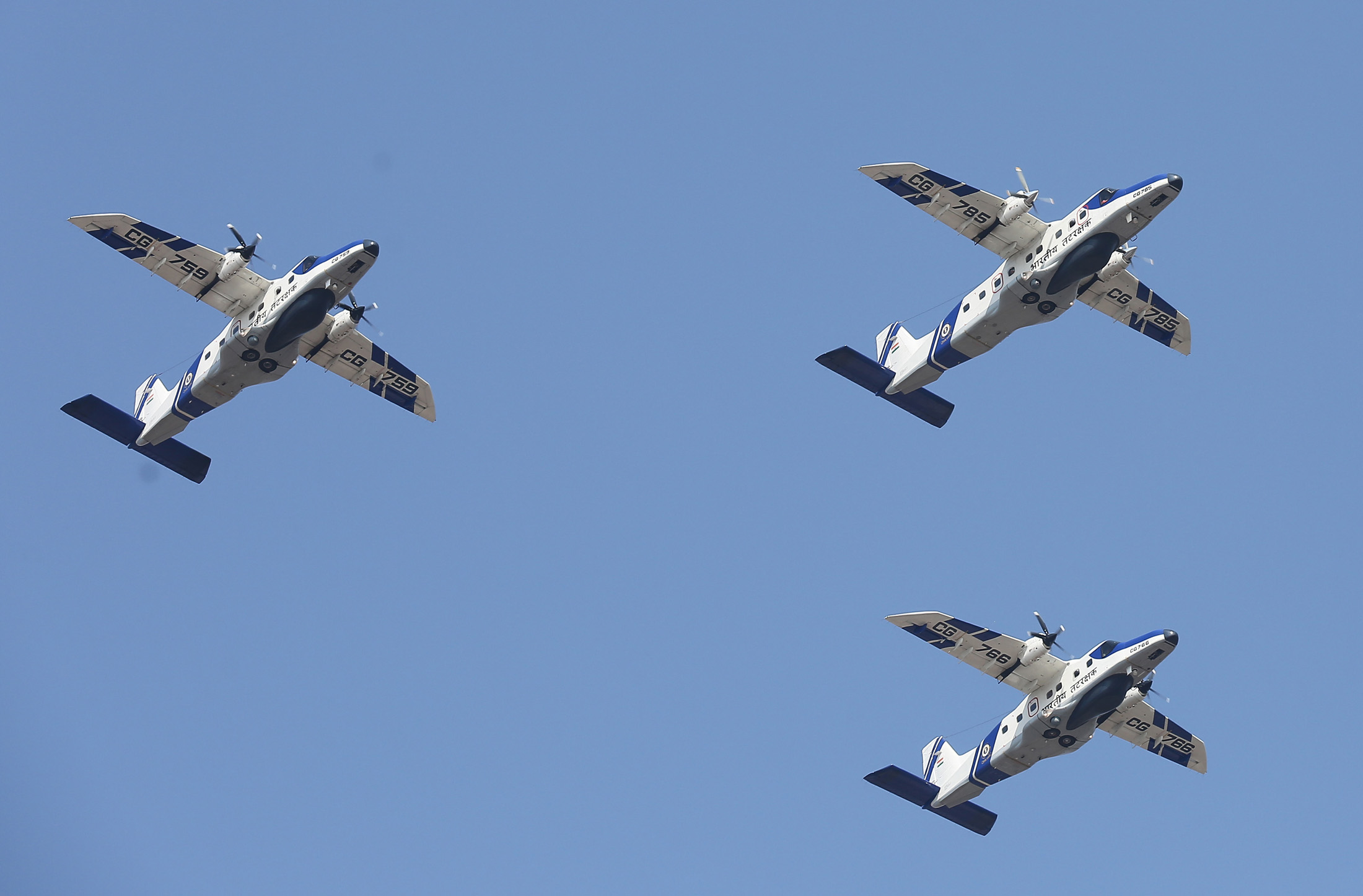
Indian Coast Guard Dornier Do 228 formation at Aero India 2025

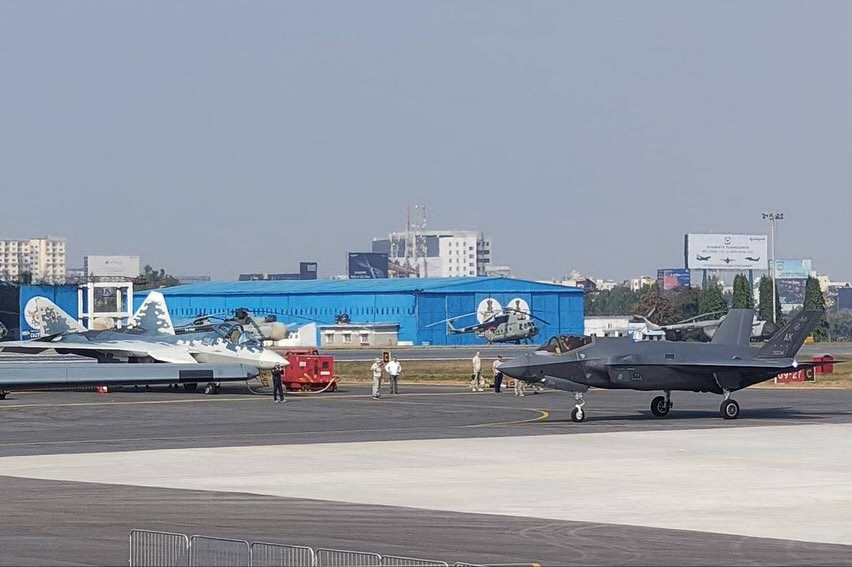
Su-57 & F-35 facing each other at Aero India 2025

== See also ==
- Farnborough Airshow
- Indo Defence Expo & Forum
- Paris Air Show
