= HAL Dhruv =

Indian multi-role helicopter

Dhruv
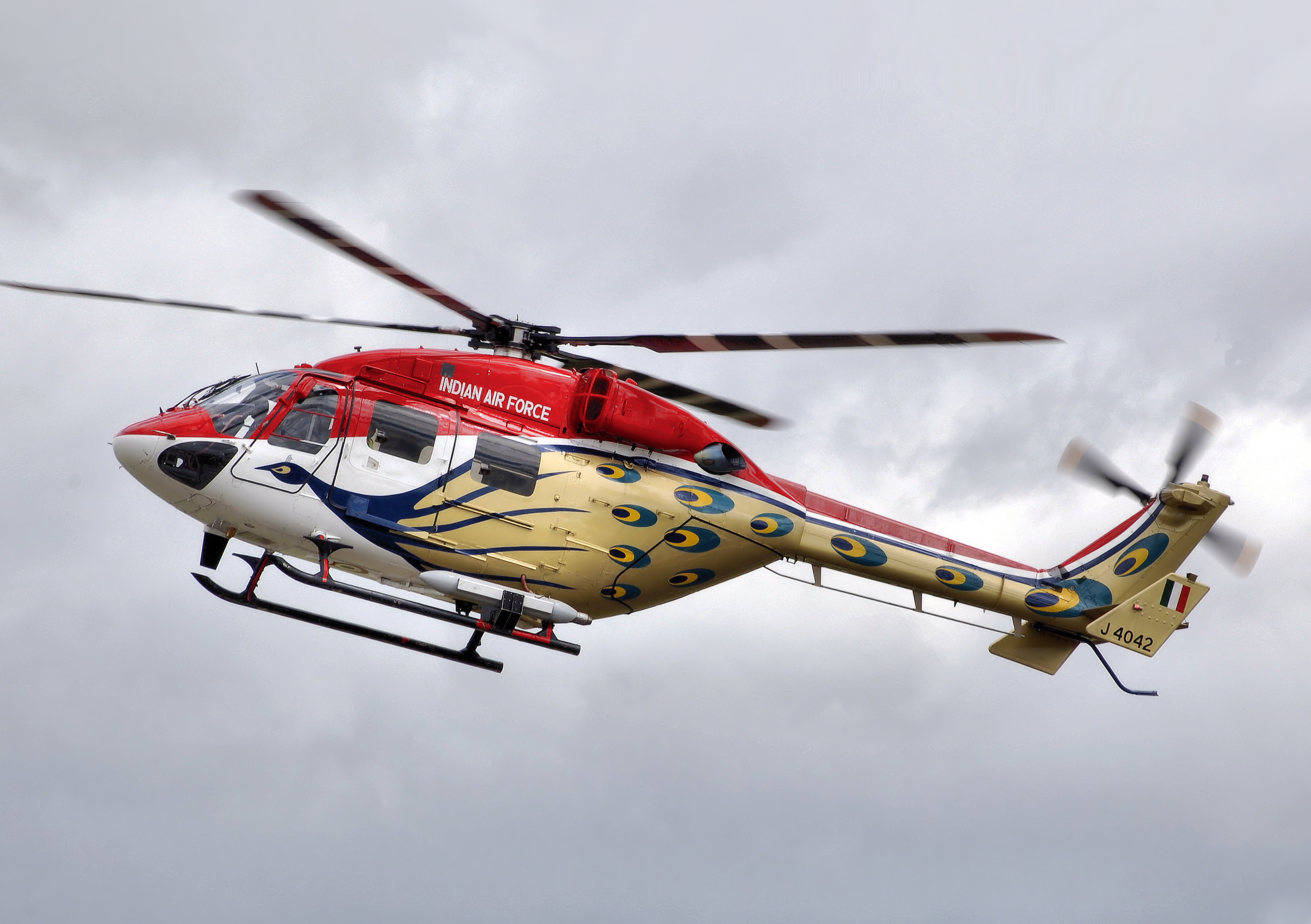
- Dhruv Mk.I with the Sarang display team

General information
- Type: Utility helicopter
- National origin: India
- Manufacturer: Hindustan Aeronautics Limited
- Designer: Rotary Wing Research and Design Center
- Status: In service
- Primary users: Indian Army Indian Air Force; Indian Navy; See Operators
- Number built: 400+ (January 2024)

History
- Manufactured: 1992–present
- Introduction date: March 2002
- First flight: 20 August 1992
- Variant: HAL Rudra
- Developed into: HAL Prachand

The HAL Dhruv (lit. 'Unshakeable') is a utility helicopter designed and developed by Hindustan Aeronautics Limited (HAL) in November 1984. The helicopter first flew in 1992; though its development was prolonged due to multiple factors including the Indian Army's requirement for design changes, budget restrictions, and sanctions placed on India following the 1998 Pokhran-II nuclear tests.

The HAL Dhruv entered operational service in 2002. It is designed to meet the requirement of both military and civil operators, with military variants of the helicopter being developed for the Indian Armed Forces, while a variant for civilian/commercial use has also been developed. Military versions in production include transport, utility, reconnaissance and medical evacuation variants.

As of January 2024, more than 400 Dhruvs had been produced for domestic and export markets logging more than 340,000 flying hours.

== Development ==
=== Origins ===
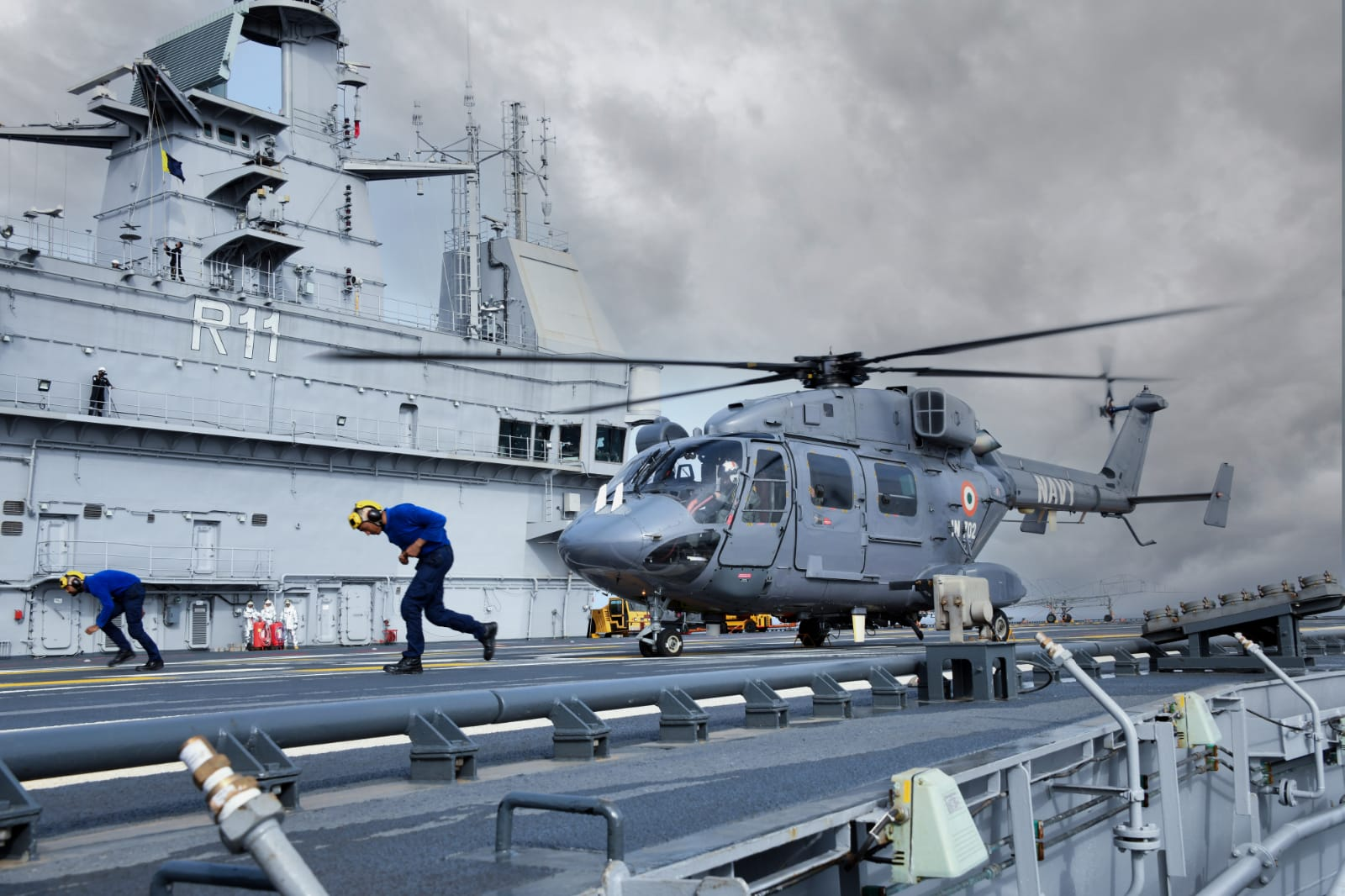
HAL Dhruv on board INS Vikrant during her sea trials

The Advanced Light Helicopter (ALH) program for an indigenous 5-ton multirole helicopter was initiated in May 1979 by the Indian Air Force and Indian Naval Air Arm. HAL were given a contract by the Indian government in 1984 to develop the helicopter; Germany's Messerschmitt-Bölkow-Blohm (MBB) were contracted in July 1984 as a design consultant and collaborative partner on the programme. Although originally scheduled to fly in 1989, the first prototype ALH (Z-3182) made its maiden flight on 20 August 1992 at Bangalore with the then-Indian Vice President K R Narayanan in attendance. This was followed by a second prototype (Z-3183) on 18 April 1993, an Army/Air Force version (Z-3268), and a navalised prototype (IN.901) with AlliedSignal CTS800 engines and a retractable tricycle undercarriage. Development problems arose due to changing military demands and a funding shortfall in the wake of the 1991 Indian economic crisis.

Naval testing on board INS Viraat and other ships started in March 1998, and around the same time a weight-reduction programme was initiated. However, further delays in development were caused when sanctions were implemented against India following a number of Pokhran-II nuclear tests in 1998 and India's continued refusal to sign the Comprehensive Nuclear-Test-Ban Treaty. As a result, the intended engine for the helicopter, the LHTEC T800, was embargoed. The Turbomeca TM 333-2B2 turboshaft engine was selected as a replacement; in addition, Turbomeca agreed to co-develop a more powerful engine with HAL, originally known as the Ardiden. Turbomeca also assisted in the development of the helicopter; stress analysis and studies of rotor dynamics were conducted in France. The first flight of Dhruv with the new engine variant, called the Shakti, took place on 16 August 2007.

=== Further development ===
The HAL Rudra, earlier known as Dhruv-WSI (Weapons Systems Integrated), is an attack variant designed for the Indian Army. Development was sanctioned in December 1998 and the prototype first flew on 16 August 2007; it is to be armed with both anti-tank and anti-aircraft missiles, and a 20-mm turret-mounted cannon. The Dhruv-WSI is to be capable of conducting combat air support (CAS) and anti-submarine warfare (ASW) roles as well. In addition to the Dhruv-WSI, HAL also developed the light combat helicopter (LCH), later christened HAL Prachand, based on the Dhruv for the Indian Armed Forces. It is fitted with stub wings for carrying up to eight anti-armour missiles, four air-to-air missiles, or four pods loaded with either 70 mm or 68 mm rockets. The LCH will also have forward-looking infrared (FLIR), a charge-coupled device (CCD) camera, and a target acquisition system with laser rangefinder and thermal vision.

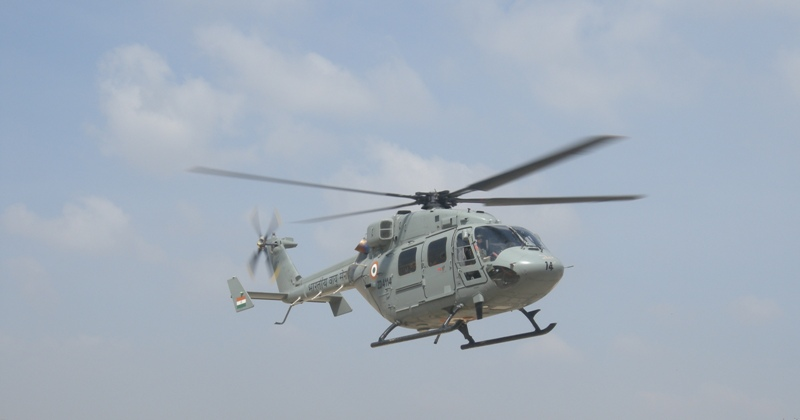
An ALH Dhruv in the Indian Air Force service.

In February 2004, HAL signed a $33 million contract with the Israel Aerospace Industries (IAI) became the sole manufacturer of the avionics for at least 100 units of HAL Dhruv, for both domestic and export markets. The firm also won the international marketing rights of the copter to promote the product in the international market against competitors including Eurocopter. Israel had contributions in developing the avionics for export variant of the helicopter and was considering one example to equip itself for VIP transport of senior defence officials. The aircraft received its civil certification in December 2003.

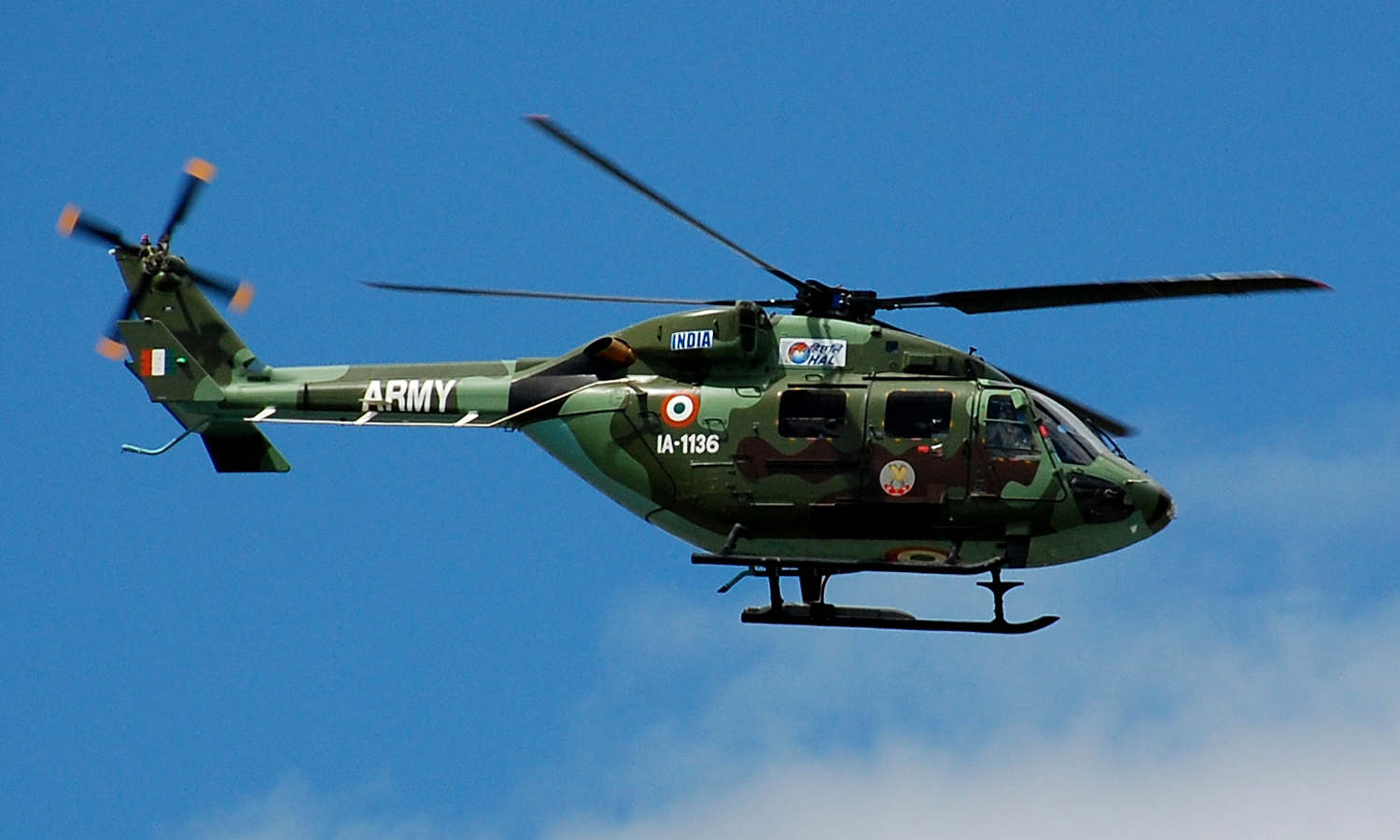
A Dhruv of the Indian Army

In 2005, following a crash landing of a Dhruv, the entire fleet was grounded when it was discovered to have been caused by excessive vibration of the tail rotor. Following a redesign which incorporated new materials in addition to changes in design methodology, the Dhruv undertook recertification and returned to service shortly after March 2006. In April 2007, a report published by the Indian Committee of Defence noted the Dhruv as one of four "focus areas" identified as having high export potential. In January 2011, HAL and partner Israel Aerospace Industries (IAI) announced that they were jointly developing the Dhruv to operate as an unmanned maritime helicopter, stating customer interest in such a feature.

The first five production Dhruv Mk III, powered by the more powerful Shakti-1H engine, were delivered to the Leh-based 205 Aviation Squadron on 7 February 2011 during a ceremony at HAL's Helicopter Division. In July 2011, India's Directorate General of Civil Aviation certified a Dhruv simulator developed by HAL and Canadian developer CAE Inc; the simulator is easily modifiable to simulate different variants of the Dhruv and other helicopters such as the Eurocopter Dauphin. Defence Bioengineering and Electromedical Laboratory (DEBEL) has been developing an oxygen life-support system to improve the helicopter's high-altitude performance, and as of August 2010 the IAF has ordered development of this system for the Dhruv.

In September 2024, HAL assigned TimeTooth Technologies, based in Bengaluru, for indigenisation of Rotor Damp System to be used on ALH Dhruv and HAL Prachand. The project involves development and qualification of the system for the next two years followed by its production and supply would be for a period of 5 years and beyond. The majority of the project will be funded by the private company itself. The production order value is expected to exceed $5 million within the 5-year period.

Samtel HAL Display Systems Limited has been contracted to provide the Advanced Light Helicopter programme with multi-function displays as of 2026.

== Design ==
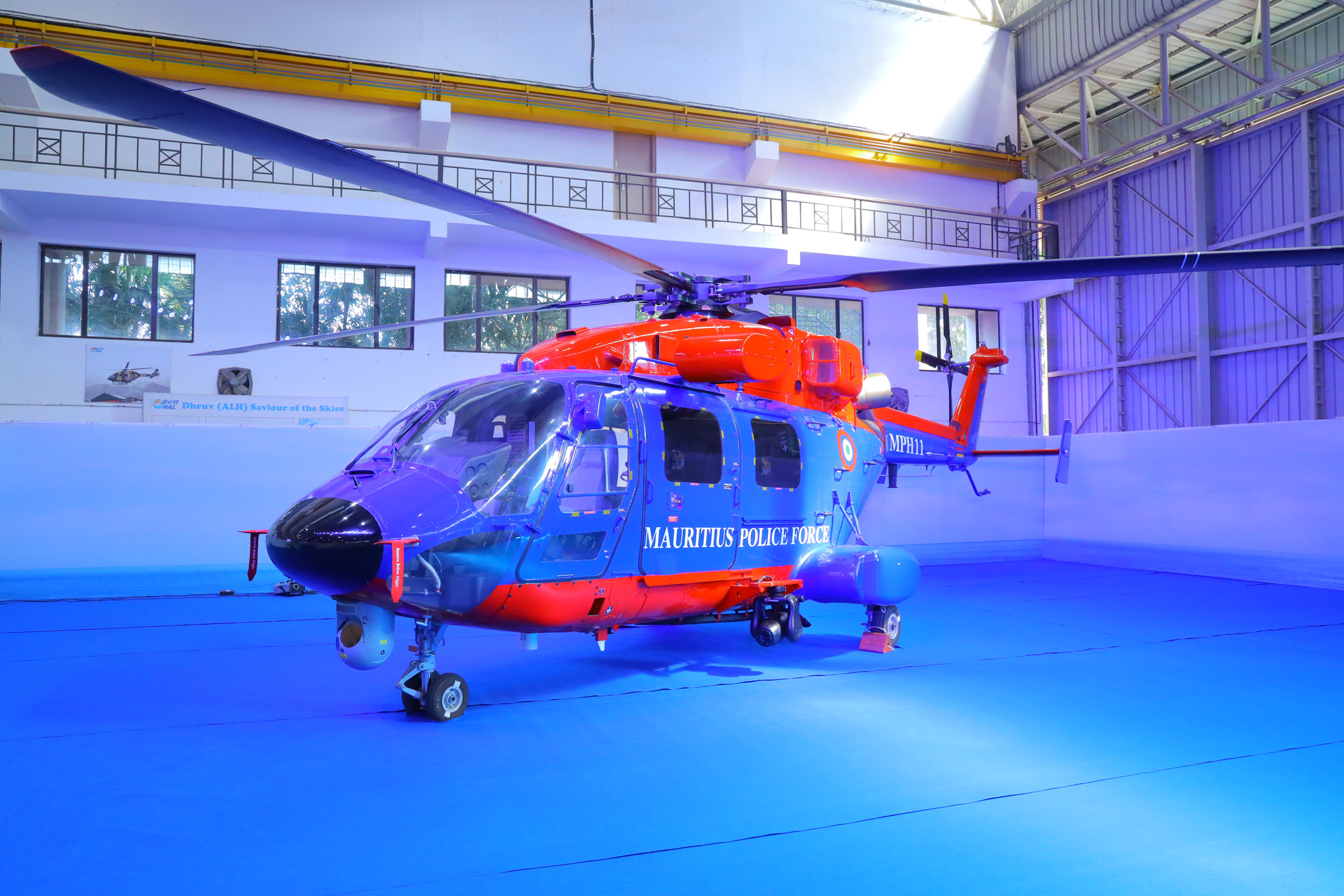
Dhruv MK.3 of Mauritius Police Force

The HAL Dhruv is of conventional design; about 29 percent of its empty weight (constituting 60 percent of the airframe's surface area) is composite materials. It has been reported that the unique carbon fibre composite developed by HAL reduced the helicopter's weight by 50 percent. The high tail boom allows easy access to the rear doors. The twin 1000 shp Turbomeca TM333-2B2 turboshafts are mounted above the cabin and drive a four-blade composite main rotor. The main rotor can be manually folded; the blades are mounted between carbon-fibre-reinforced plates, the rotor head is constructed from fibre elastomers. In February 2004, US helicopter company Lord Corporation were awarded a contract to develop an active vibration control system (AVCS), which monitors onboard conditions and cancels out fuselage vibrations.

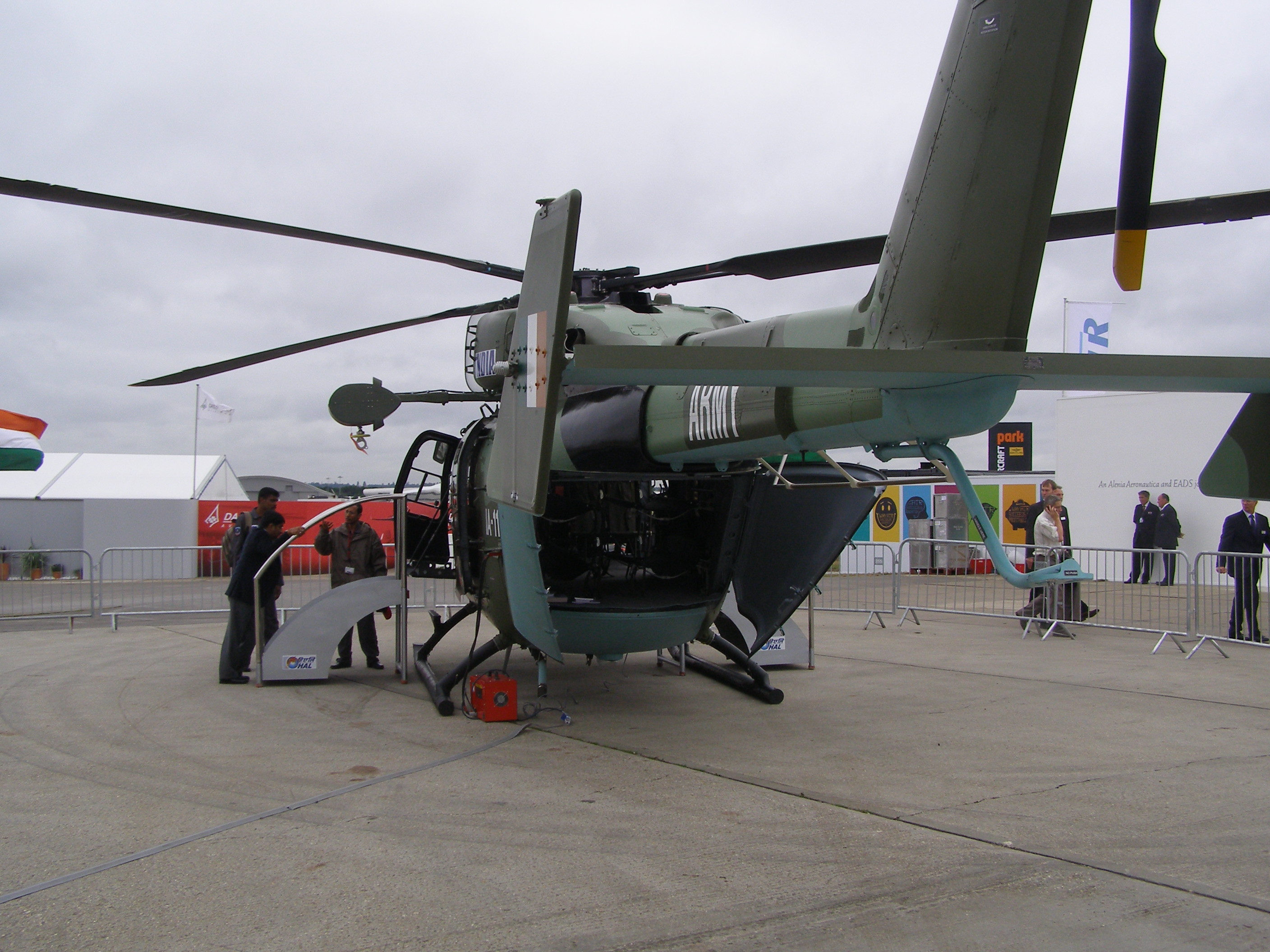
A HAL Dhruv military variant with cargo bay open

The cockpit section of the fuselage is of Kevlar and carbon-fibre construction; it is also fitted with crumple zones and crashworthy seats. The aircraft is equipped with a SFIM Inc four-axis automatic flight control system. Avionics systems include a HF/UHF communications radio, IFF recognition, Doppler navigation, and a radio altimeter; a weather radar and the Omega navigation system were options for the naval variant. IAI has also developed targeting systems and an electronic warfare suite for the Dhruv, as well as avionics for day-and-night flight observation. HAL's claim that the Dhruv is indigenous has been challenged by 5h3 Comptroller and Auditor General of India, who reported that as of August 2010 the helicopter was: "...against the envisaged indigenisation level of 50% (by 2008), 90% of the value of material used in each ALH is still imported from foreign suppliers".

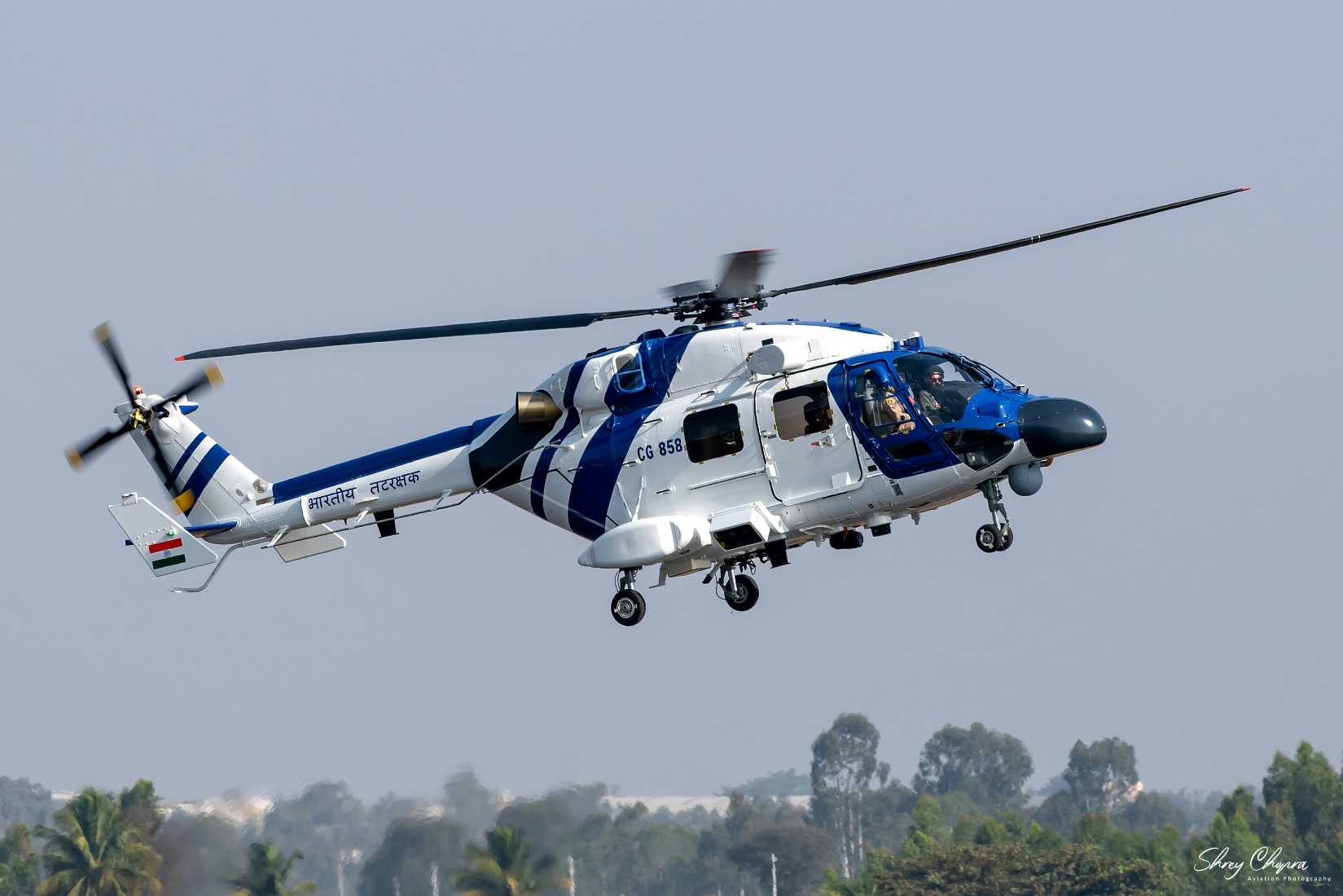
HAL Dhruv MK-III of the Indian Coast Guard

US Army deploying from Dhruv of the Indian Army's 201st Army Aviation Squadron during Yudh Abhyas joint military exercise in 2009

In September 2010, it was reported that the Dhruv's Integrated Dynamic System (IDS), which combines several key rotor control functions into a single module carrying the engine's power to the rotors, was suffering from excessive wear, necessitating frequent replacement; as a consequence the cruising speed had been restricted to 250 km/h and high-altitude performance was lessened as well. HAL contracted Italian aerospace firm Avio for consultancy purposes and they subsequently replicated production of the IDS in Italy in order to isolate the problem with the early testing of the Dhruv subsequently being criticized as "rushed". In June 2011, HAL has reported that the issue had been resolved and not present in the Dhruv Mk III; a number of alterations both to the design and production had been made to improve the IDS. A programme of retrofitting the Mk I and Mk II was completed by June 2011.

The ALH Mk-III with new Shakti-1H engines has better and improved high altitude performance operating at altitudes over 6 km. It comes with seating for 14 fully equipped troops. DGCA has reportedly praised its crashworthy design as a few accidents have not caused any fatalities.

== Orders ==
- Nepal placed an order for two Dhruvs in 2004.
- Three major orders for civilian Dhruv helicopters were placed in 2005. The orders was placed by Oil and Natural Gas Corporation (ONGC) for three helicopters, Jharkhand State Government for 2 units and Karnataka State Government for one on lease. The combined order value exceeded ₹100 crore (US$22.68 million). Jharkhand ordered the helicopters at a cost of ₹35 crore (US$7.94 million) under the police modernisation funds for use by the state police force.
- India was expected to order up to 12 Dhruvs outfitted with an onboard emergency medical suite, to be used by the Armed Forces Medical Services for MEDEVAC purposes as of August 2007. The National Disaster Management Authority (NDMA) placed an order for 12 Dhruv helicopters equipped with a full medical suite, including ventilators and two stretchers in 2007.
- On 23 December 2007, another major order of 159 helicopters, worth ₹14,000 crore (equivalent to ₹460 billion or US$4.9 billion in 2026), for the Indian Army (105) and Air Force (54) was approved by the Cabinet Committee on Security (CCS) after a delay of nine months. The order was placed by September 2009.
- In June 2008, HAL has secured an order from the Ecuadorian Air Force (EAF) for seven Dhruvs, worth US$50.7 million.
- In August 2008, a deal was reportedly finalised with Turkey for three Dhruvs for US$20 million for use in the medical assistance role.
- In 2009, it was announced that India's Home Ministry had ordered eight Dhruvs for the Border Security Force (BSF).
- In March 2017, HAL received an order for 32 Dhruv for the Indian Navy (16) and the Indian Coast Guard (16). The order was worth ₹80 billion (equivalent to ₹120 billion or US$1.3 billion in 2026) and was cleared by the Cabinet Committee on Security earlier.
- On 4 September 2017, an order of 41 helicopters for Indian Army (40) and Indian Navy (1). The order is to be executed within 60 months The order was worth ₹6,100 crore (equivalent to ₹93 billion or US$1.0 billion in 2026). The contract was earlier cleared by the Defence Acquisition Council (DAC) of the Ministry of Defence and chaired by the Defence Minister on 23 December 2013 at a cost of ₹300 crore (US$51.2 million).
- Apart from getting 16 Dhruv Mk III, Indian Coast Guard issued Letter of Intent (LoI) for nine additional units in 2022. In March 2024, Cabinet Committee on Security (CCS) approved the procurement of 34 Dhruv Mk III variants. The order was signed between MoD and HAL on 14 March 2024. The Indian Army would receive 25 units of Dhruv MkIII UT while Coast Guard will get 9 units of Dhruv MkIII MR. The order was worth ₹8,073 crore (equivalent to ₹86 billion or US$920 million in 2026). On 10 April 2026, ICG received the first batch of four Dhruv MkIII MR.
- On 29 January 2026, HAL received an order worth over ₹1,800 crore (equivalent to ₹19 billion or US$200 million in 2026) from Pawan Hans to supply 10 Dhruv NG helicopters including associated spares and accessories. The deliveries will be completed by 2027. Four helicopters will be deployed for ONGC operations under an agreement signed on 17 December 2024. The first four helicopters were delivered on 18 September 2026, with the rest to be delivered in the current financial year.
- On 3 March 2026, the defence ministry placed an order for 6 Dhruv Mk III (MR) variants for the Indian Coast Guard with HAL at a cost of ₹2,901 crore (US$310 million). The Defence Acquisition Council (DAC) had approved the procurement on 3 December 2024.
- The Defence Acquisition Council (DAC) approved another batch of procurement on 7 September 2026 for the Indian Army.

== Operational history ==
Deliveries of the Dhruv commenced in January 2002, nine years after the prototype's first flight, and nearly eighteen years after the program was initiated. The first batch of eight ALH were distributed among the Indian Army, the Navy, the Air Force and the Coast Guard in March 2002. The initial commitment for the helicopter from the various services included 120 each from the Army and the Navy, 60 from the Air Force and seven from the Coast Guard. The delivery target was 15 years. This required HAL to incrementally increase its annual production output from then current 12–16 units to 20 and then to 24 units. The peak production rate could be 36 units as well.

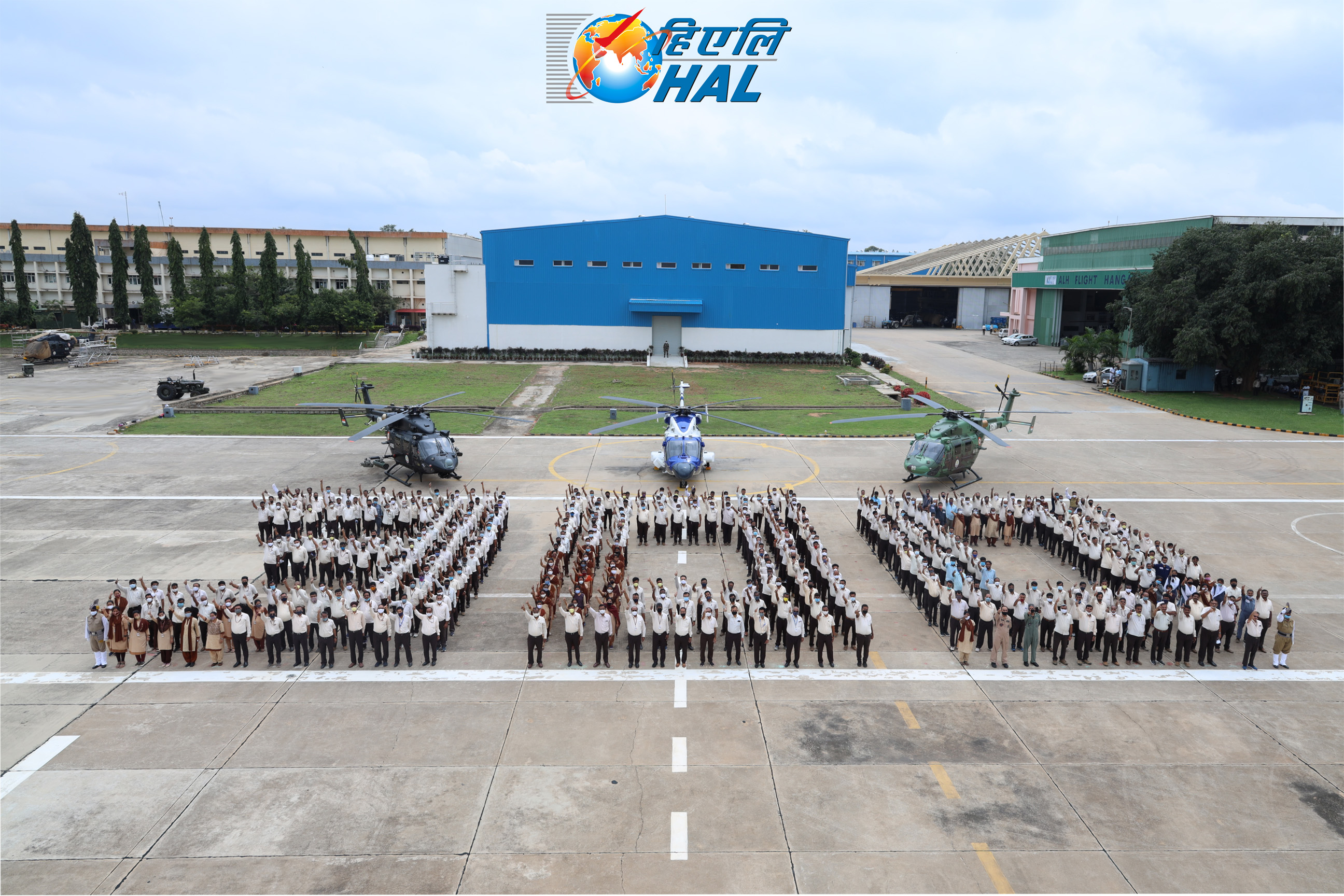
HAL introduces the 300th Dhruv Advanced Light Helicopter

In early 2006, 46 helicopters were in service with the Indian military, 30 with the Army, 13 with the Air Force and three with the Navy. By 2007-end, the number rose to over 75 Dhruvs were in service with the Indian military along with 10 civil variants. By February 2012, the division also completed the delivery of over 100 Dhruvs. In February 2012, HAL reported that the Indian Army and Air Force had an order book of 159 units of Dhruv helicopters.

As of March 2017, there were 228 Dhruv helicopters in active service, including 163 Mk.I and Mk.II variants, 48 Mk.III and 17 HAL Rudra (Mk.IV) variants. In May 2018, Israel Aerospace Industries was awarded a contract to upgrade cockpits of 150 Dhruv helicopters, in addition to 50 that had been contracted earlier.

In September 2020, HAL announced that it had rolled out the 300th Advance Light Helicopter from its Bengaluru production line. Meanwhile, they were executing an order from the Army of 73 units and from the Navy and Coast Guard of 16 units each, 38 of which had been delivered with the rest would be delivered by 2022.

=== Indian Armed Forces ===
==== Indian Coast Guard ====
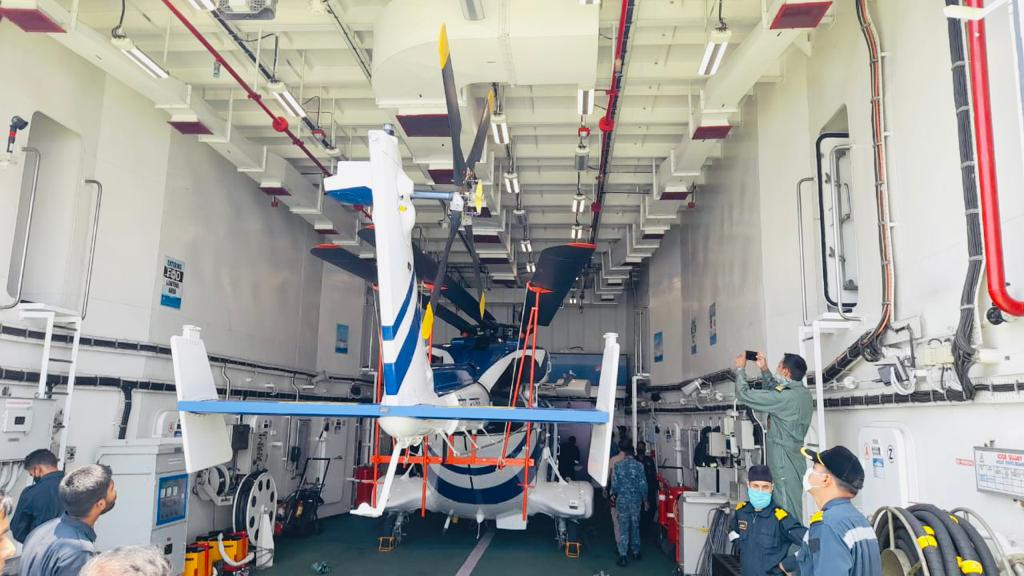
Dhruv Mk.III towed inside the hangar of an Indian Coast Guard patrol vessel

The Indian Coast Guard was the first service to induct the ALH, registered CG-851, on 18 March 2002. Meanwhile, the Indian Navy introduced its first two of the type, IN-701 and IN-702, on 28 March 2002. As of 2008, the Indian Coast Guar operates three Dhruv copters. On 10 February 2003, the Intensive Flying and Trials Unit (IFTU) was established at INS Garuda, Kochi. Following extensive user trials for three years, the helicopter was cleared for operations and two ALH flights were established at Kochi and Goa (INS Hansa). The merger of the flights resulted in the ALH Flight Kochi which remained the sole operator of the helicopter until the commissioning of the first squadron.

In 2017, the Indian Navy and Coast Guard placed an order for 16 Dhruv choppers each. This helicopters would consist of the newer Mk.III Marine Reconnaissance (MR) variants. HAL delivered three such variants to the Navy and two to the Coast Guard on 5 February 2021. The variant demonstrated ship deck-based operations in April 2021 in a series of ship-borne trials conducted off the Chennai coast in coordination with the Coast Guard. The trials included landing on the deck, folding of blades, storing the helicopter inside hangar, undertaking maintenance activities inside the hangar as well as on-deck hot refuelling. During the trials, the helicopter was fielded for missions including surveillance, search and rescue as well as anti-pollution to address oil spillage.

In May and June 2022, the Coast Guard commissioned its second and third Dhruv Mk.III (MR) squadrons at Kochi and Porbandar.

==== Indian Navy ====
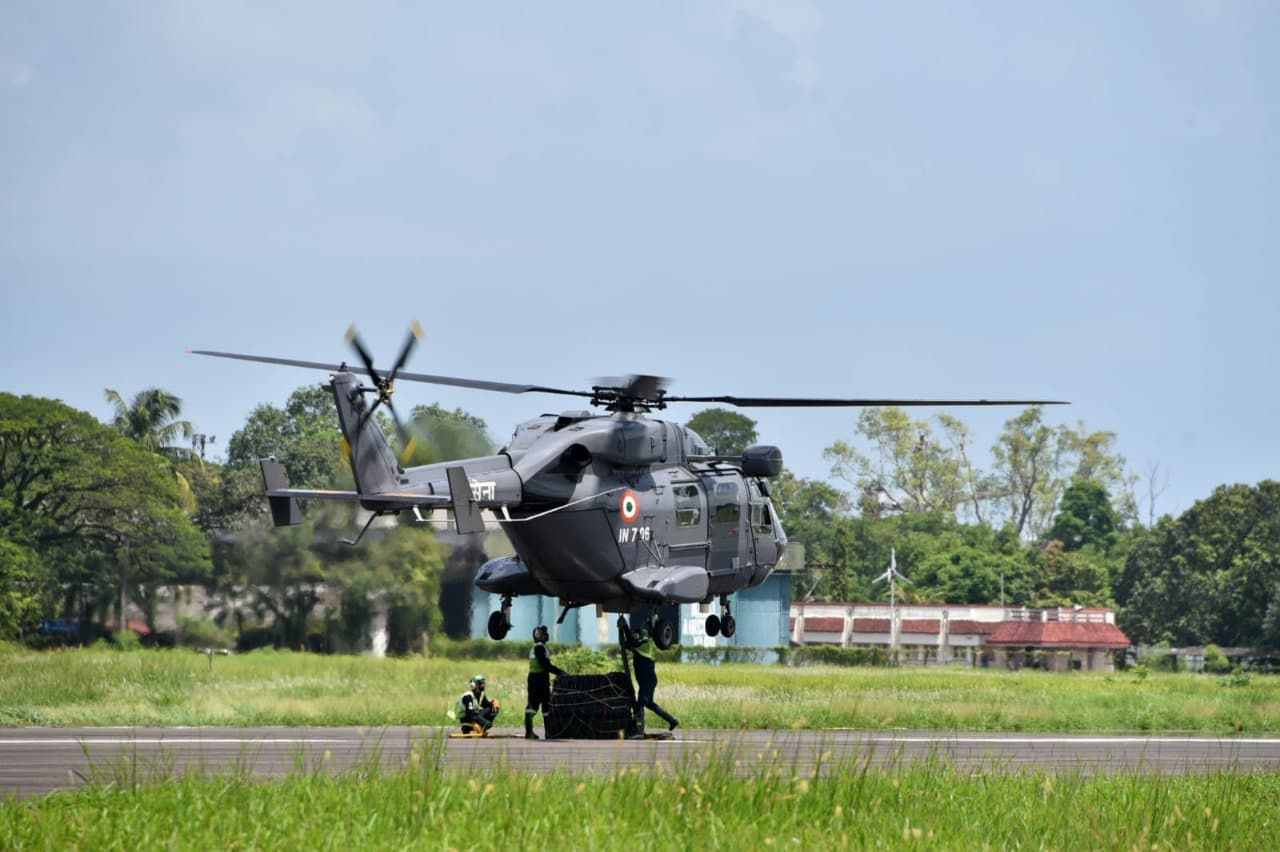
Technicians attaching underslung load on an Indian Navy Dhruv

On 12 November 2013, the Indian Navy commissioned their first Dhruv squadron (INAS 322, Guardians) at INS Garuda. The helicopters would be deployed as an advanced search and rescue (SAR) helicopter for heliborne operations and armed patrol with night vision devices".

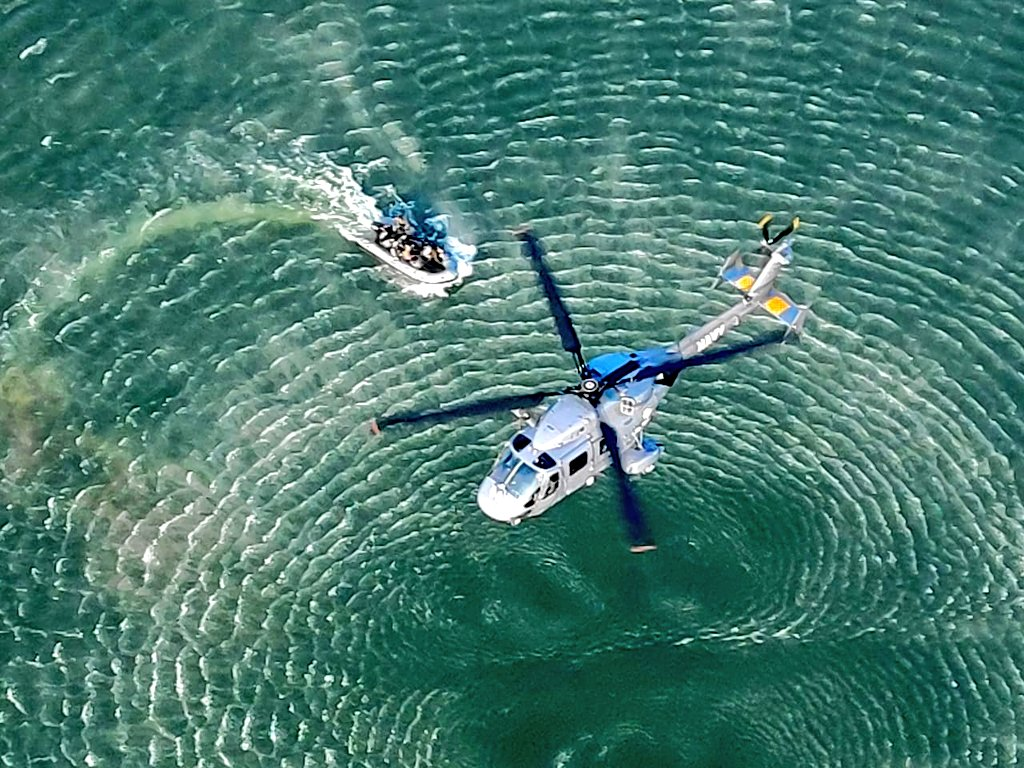
HAL Dhruv of Indian Navy during special operation with MARCOS

In October 2008, the then Defence Minister A. K. Antony announced that the Indian Navy will deploy the Dhruv in the utility role. The proposed anti-submarine warfare (ASW) variant had been deemed unsuitable by the Navy, which was reportedly dissatisfied with the folding blade performance and maintenance record. In 2015, HAL modified the foldable rotor's design to allow the Dhruv to be carried on board light frigates; several Indian Navy helicopters shall receive this modification. The Navy has considered the Dhruv for maritime surveillance and search and rescue roles, and in 2008 a senior Navy official said: "The ALH has a long way to go before the programme matures sufficiently for it to undertake basic naval roles such as search and rescue (SAR) and communication duties."

On 27 April 2016, the Indian Navy stationed an ALH MK III at Maldives, to be based at Kadhdhoo Island in Laamu Atol. The helicopter will assist the Maldives National Defence Force in undertaking search and rescue, casualty evacuation, coastal surveillance, maritime reconnaissance, communication and logistic duties. The Indian Naval Contingent is headed by Cdr Rohit Gupte and comprises 4 officers and 21 sailors. The technical support team comprises 13 technicians and is headed by Lt Cdr Jithu K Joy. The support team with the spares and support equipment reached Male on 25 April 2016.

An Indian Navy Dhruv was used to MEDVAC a 42-year old oil rig worker from Greatdrill Chaaya in the Arabian sea. He received urgent medical attention for cardiac arrest. The Helicopter took off from INS Garuda and flew 110 kilometers both ways on 15 April 2026 to complete the rescue efforts.

==== Indian Army ====
The Army received the first three ALH, registered IA-1101 to 1103, on 20 March 2002. By 23 December 2007, the Indian Army established two ALH squadrons at Nashik and Manasbal.

The Dhruv is capable of flying at high altitudes, as it was an Army requirement for the helicopter to be able operate in the Siachen Glacier and Kashmir regions. In September 2007, the Dhruv Mk.3 was cleared for high-altitude flying in the Siachen Sector after six months of trials. In October 2007, a Dhruv Mk.3 flew to an altitude of 27,500 feet (8,400 m) ASL in Siachen. An Indian Army report in 2009 criticised the Dhruv's performance, stating: "The ALH was not able to fly above 5,000m, though the army's requirements stipulated an ability to fly up to 6,500m"; this has been blamed on the TM333 engine. As a consequence the Army had to continue relying on the older Cheetah/Cheetal helicopters to meet the shortfall. The more powerful Shakti-1H engine has since been introduced on the Dhruv Mk.3; on one test it carried 600 kg load to Sonam Post against the Army's requirement of 200 kg. The Indian Army received the first batch of Dhruv Mk.3s during Aero India 2011.

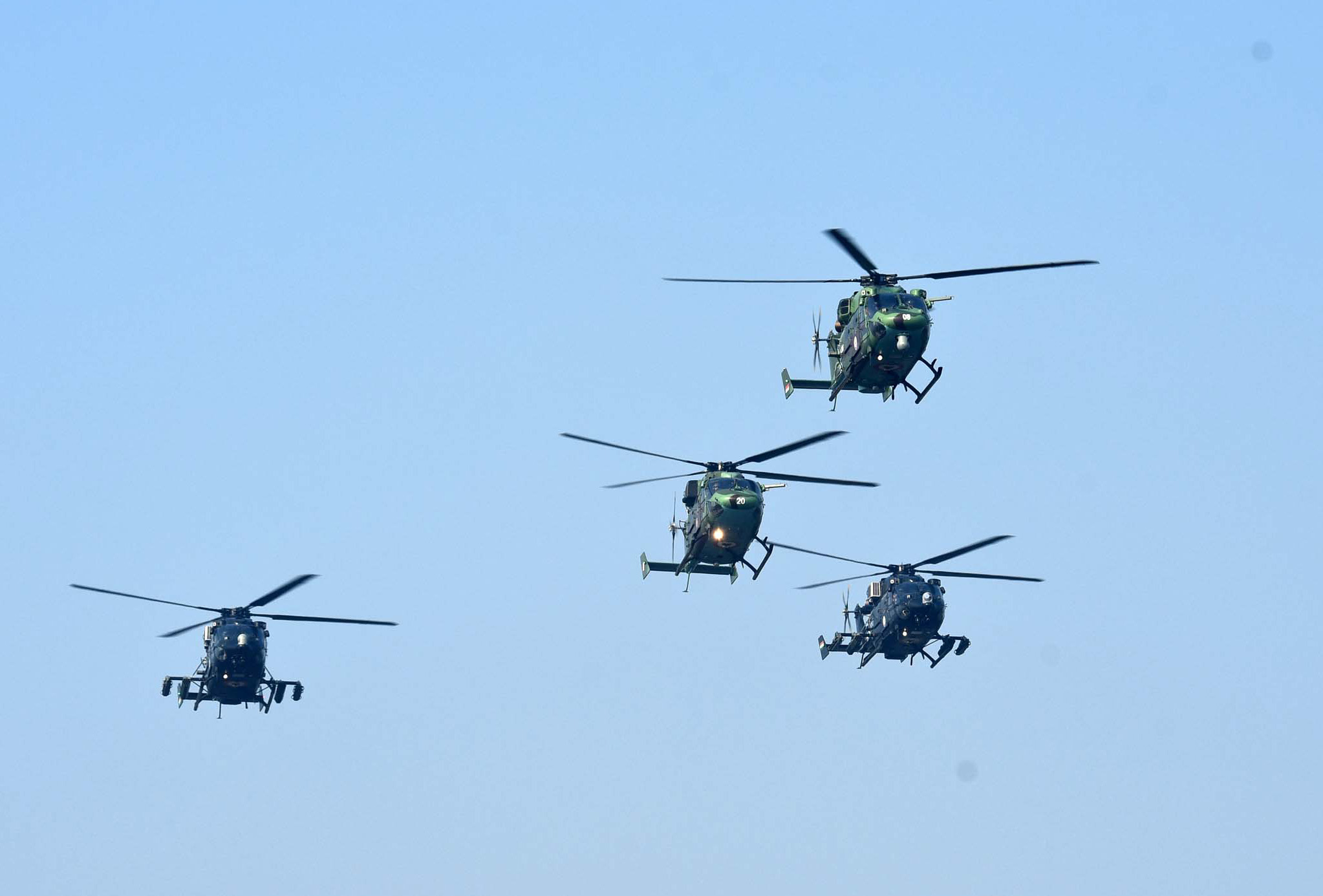
HAL Dhruv and HAL Rudra in Rudra formation over Rajpath, at the Republic Day celebrations, on 26 January 2020

On 9 February 2011, the Indian Army received their first batch of five Dhruv Mk III helicopters, from the 2007's 159 ALH programme. The helicopters, which were the first of the 2007's 159 helicopter order as well, was handed over by HAL chairman Ashok Nayak to Major General PK Bharali on the maiden day of the Aero India 2011. One unit was put on static display also.

Six Army Dhruvs along with 18 Air Force Dhruvs were used during rescue operations after the 2013 North India floods. Their compact size, agility, ability to carry up to 16 people to heights of 10,000 ft, and to evacuate stranded people from inaccessible regions was praised. The Dhruv could carry more people from high-altitude helipads than the heavier Mi-17, and land where the lighter Bell 407 could not. Total flight time during Operation Rahat and Operation Surya Hope was 630 hours, of which 550 hours were dedicated to SAR missions.

The 25 ALH Mk III helicopters ordered by the Army in 2024 are being fully equipped with Elbit EO Pods as well as Saab Integrated Defensive Aids Suite (IDAS). The latter had been selected by HAL as the helicopter's electronic warfare self-protection system. The IDAS, also designated as Integrated Architecture Display System (IADS), features capabilities like Missile Approach Warning, Laser Warning, and Radar Warning. From late April 2025, the helicopters were used for counterterrorism operations in Kashmir after the 2025 Pahalgam attack.

==== Indian Air Force ====
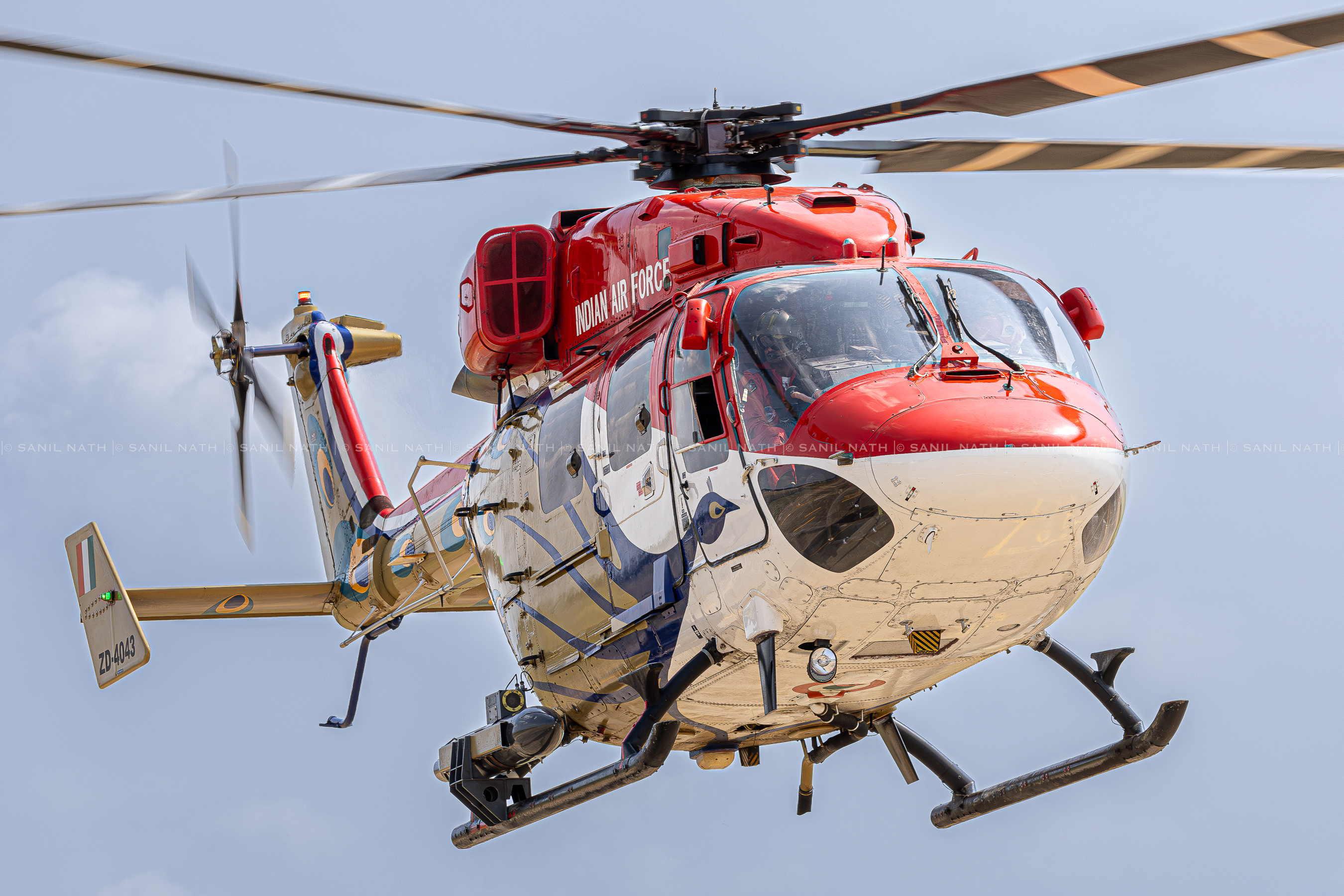
Sarang Helicopter display team of the IAF

The Indian Air Force accepted its first pair of Dhurvs, J-4041 and J-4042, on 30 March 2002. The Indian Air Force operationalised two ALH squadrons in Yelehanka AFS in Bengaluru and Sarsawa AFS.

The Indian Air Force's Sarang aerobatic display team performs using four Dhruv helicopters. HAL Dhruv of the Indian Army and the Sarang display team performed at the Farnborough Air Show 2008 between 14 and 20 July. Following the 2011 Sikkim earthquake, four Dhruvs conducted rescue operations.

On 8 February 2012, the Indian Air Force inducted its maiden batch of 10 units of Dhruv Mk III variant in the Bareilly Air Force Station. The helicopters, assigned with the No. 111 Helicopter Unit, were received by the then Central Air Command's Senior Staff Officer Air Marshal PS Gill.

==== Central Armed Police Forces ====
In May 2009, the Border Security Force (BSF) expressed interest to acquire eight ALH choppers besides a large transport aircraft and two small aircraft from abroad. The contract was to be finalised by the fiscal year. The Ministry of Home Affairs has approved the procurement for the Air Wing of the BSF. Four ALH were to be delivered in 2009 followed by the rest in 2010.

By February 2012, seven Dhruv helicopters had been delivered to the Border Security Force to assist in their anti-naxalite operations in coordination with the Central Reserve Police Force (CRPF). The BSF choppers are owned by the BSF and are maintained and operated by the Pawan Hans. However, the maintenance services offered by Pawan Hans were under question due to multiple helicopter crashes occurring under their services. However, the MHA remains dependant on the company due to the otherwise very expensive pilot training. In February 2012, the home ministry reported that the Dhruv remained grounded after even another Dhruv crash in Raipur during a flight test. The Mi-17 fleet of the Indian Air Force were supporting the operations of the Central Armed Police Forces (CAPF) as a stopgap measure due to the absence of the grounded fleet unless the MHA buys and wet-lease additional helicopters. Gradually, the Border Security Force (BSF) fleet of six Dhruvs were transferred to the bases in western borders including Bikaner and Jodhpur in the 2020s.

=== Other Indian operators ===
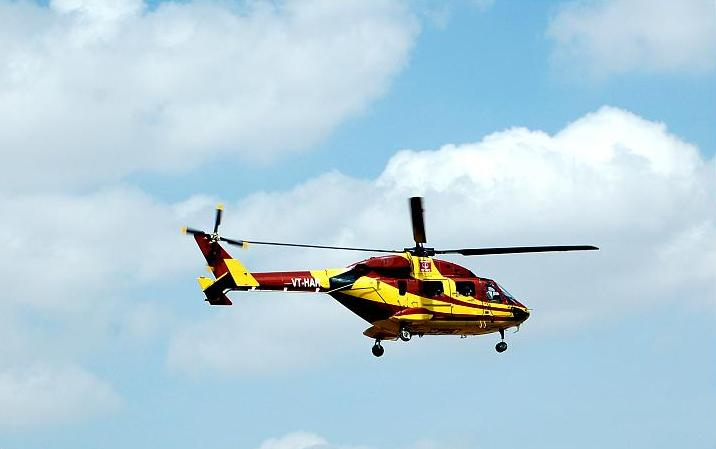
A Dhruv civil in ONGC colours

On 30 August 2007, a Dhruv helicopter landed at the Ranchi Airport marking the first delivery to the Government of Jharkhand. This was first of the type to be delivered to a government or state operator. In October 2011, Jharkhand's state government appealed for Mi-17 helicopters from the Union Government. This was because the Dhruv was sent to HAL in January for maintenance which is stipulated for every 500 flying hours by the DGCA. A major inspection and maintenance works took six months of time. However, in that instance the helicopter's return was postponed to November, as operations of their Dhruvs had been disrupted by prolonged maintenance delays and a major crash. Earlier, a similar ferry flight ended in a crash in Andhra Pradesh. Meanwhile, one chopper was leased to the Government of Karnataka and the third was to be delivered to the Oil and Natural Gas Corporation (ONGC) in the third week of September.

Civil Dhruv variants are produced for transport, rescue, policing, offshore operations, air-ambulance, and other roles. The Oil and Natural Gas Corporation (ONGC) use the Dhruv for offshore operations. Several Indian state governments are to use Dhruvs for police and transportation duties. In March 2011, India's Directorate General of Civil Aviation released a proposed airworthiness directive asking all civilian Dhruv operators to temporarily ground their aircraft due to cracks potentially forming in the tail area, and recommended reinforcing affected areas.

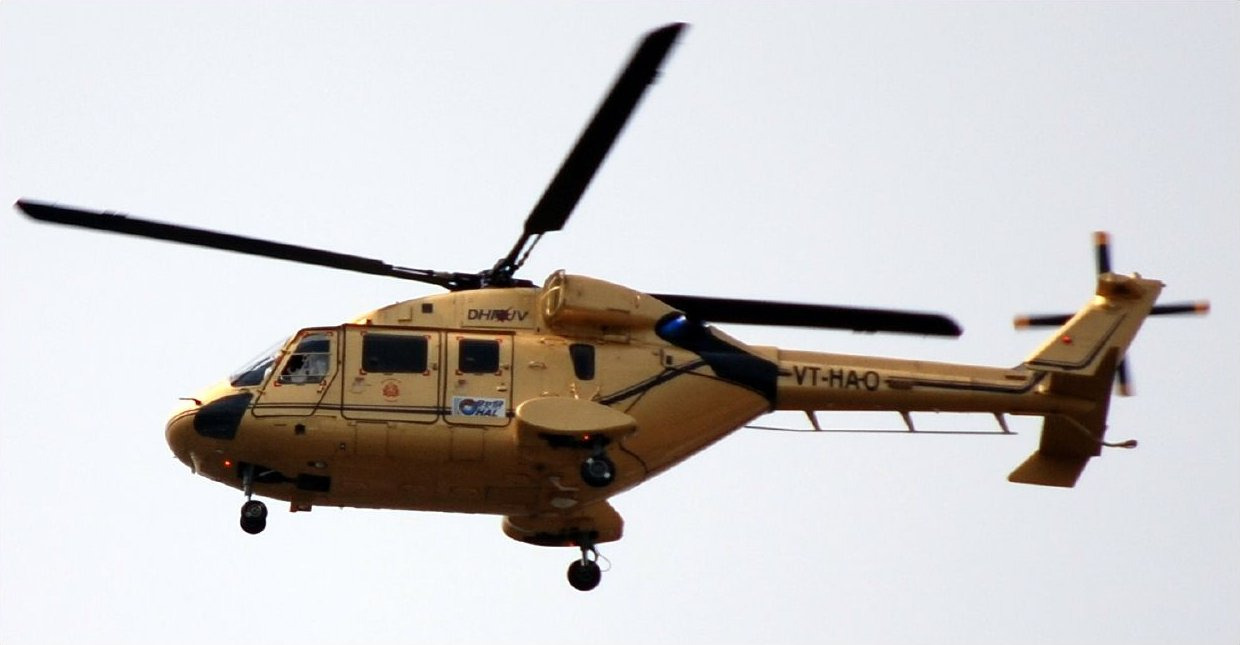
Dhruv civil variant

In January 2014, the Geological Survey of India (GSI) inducted a Dhruv equipped with a heliborne geophysical survey system (HGSS). Costing ₹63 crore (US$7 million), the HGSS can conduct magnetic, spectrometric and gravity surveys.

By September 2024, Oil and Natural Gas Corporation (ONGC) chose HAL Dhruv operated by Pawan Hans for its operations to fly out personnel and equipment from offshore oil rigs. An initial order of 10 Dhruvs is expected with the order quantity expected to cross 28 units later. On 17 December 2024, Pawan Hans Limited received an order worth ₹2,141 crore (equivalent to ₹23 billion or US$240 million in 2026) to deploy four Dhruv-NG variant helicopters for offshore operations for 10 years. The 10-helicopter order was placed on 29 January 2026. The first four helicopters were delivered to Pawan Hans on 18 September 2026. The remaining will also be delivered in the current financial year.

=== Foreign users ===
Israel: A civilian Dhruv was leased to the Israeli Defense Ministry in 2004; IAI has also made use of the Defense Ministry's Dhruv for marketing and public relations purposes.

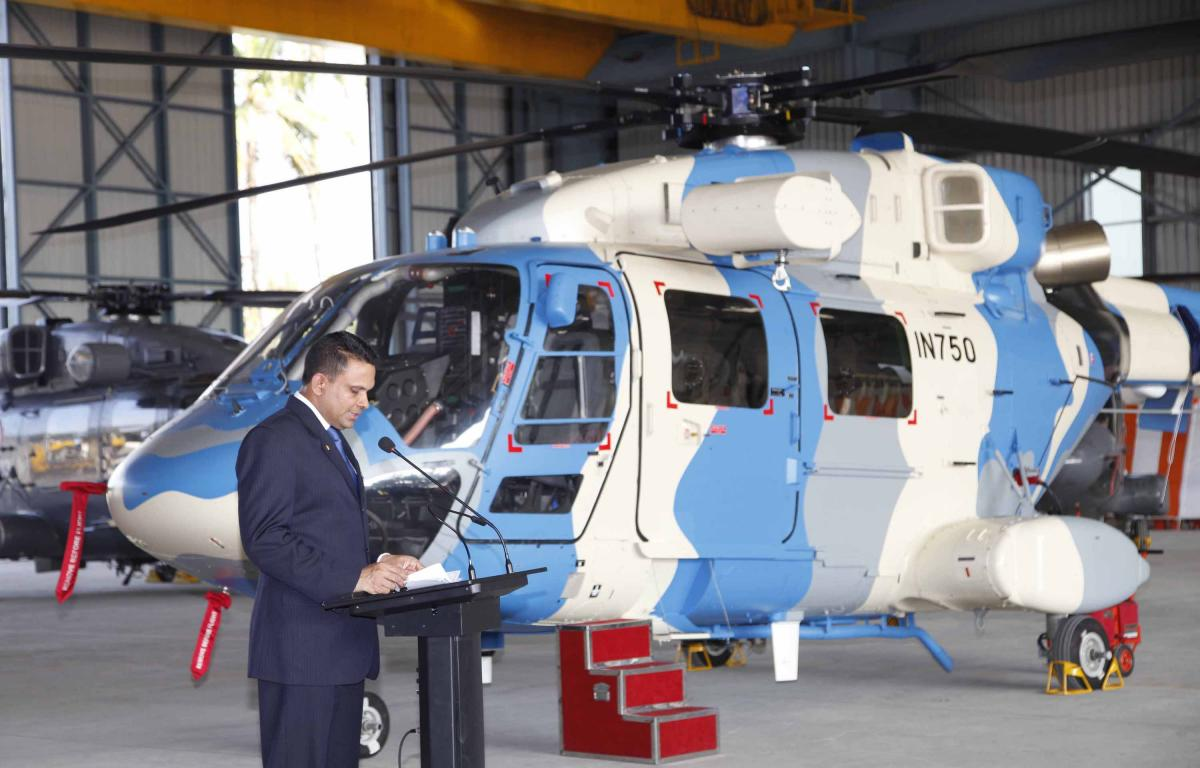
HAL Dhruv helicopter gifted to Maldives

Maldives: In April 2010, the Indian Navy gifted a Dhruv to the Maldives National Defence Force for conducting search and rescue and medical evacuation, while a second Mk.III equipped with a weather radar was donated in December 2013. The first helicopter is based at Addu Atoll and the second will be based at Hanimaadhoo.

Myanmar: In 2007, Amnesty International stated it possessed evidence that India planned to transfer two Dhruvs to Burma, and pointed to the use of European-sourced components as a possible violation of the European Union (EU) arms embargo against that country. The Indian government disputed Amnesty's claims and denied any wrongdoing.

Nepal: In early 2004, the first foreign order for the Dhruv was placed by Nepal for two examples. Both were delivered as of August 2007. In November 2014, India gifted another Dhruv to Nepali Army as part of a strategic pact.

Peru: In June 2008, the government of Peru ordered two air ambulance Dhruvs for use by the Peruvian Health Services.

Turkey: In August 2008, a deal was reportedly finalised with Turkey for three Dhruvs for US$20 million, with plans to buy as many as 17 of the helicopters for use in the medical assistance role.

=== Potential users ===
The Dhruv has become the first major Indian weapons system to have secured large foreign sales. In 2004, HAL stated that it hoped to sell 120 Dhruvs over the next eight years, and has been displaying the Dhruv at air shows, including Farnborough and Paris in order to market the Dhruv. HAL had entered into a partnership with Israel Aerospace Industries (IAI) to develop and promote the Dhruv, IAI has also helped develop new avionics and a glass cockpit for newer variants of the Dhruv.

With a unit price at least 15 percent less than its rivals, the Dhruv has elicited interest in many countries, mostly from Latin America, Africa, West Asia, South East Asia and the Pacific Rim nations. Air forces from around 35 countries have made inquiries, along with requests for demonstrations. Flight certification for Europe and North America is also being planned in order to tap the large civilian market there.

Russia: In July 2006, the then Chief of Air Staff, Air Chief Marshal Shashindra Pal Tyagi commented that India could purchase as many as 80 Mi-17 helicopters if Russia in turn bought Dhruv helicopters in exchange.

South America: HAL has reportedly been negotiating with Bolivia for five Dhruvs; and with Venezuela for up to seven.

Southeast Asia: The Dhruv has also been offered to Malaysia, while it is also being evaluated by the Indonesian Army.

Philippines: The HAL Annual Report for 2020–21, indicated that the Philippine Coast Guard is interested to potentially buy 7 Dhruvs via Indian-based credit. It is reported that the PCG is looking at the Dhruv ALH. There has been to instances when the capabilities of Dhruv were demonstrated to Philippines. It was first used when PCG chief Admiral Artemio M Abu visited Indian Coast Guard facility at Goa in 2023 and took part in a "Customer Demonstration Flight" and second was when a three ship flotilla (including INS Delhi (D61), INS Shakti (A57) and INS Kiltan visited Manila, Philippines in May 2024.

Egypt: Egypt stated in 2022 that it was interested in acquiring the ALH.

Argentina: The Argentinian Ministry of Defense signed a Letter of Intent (LOI) to procure the Dhruv for the Armed Forces of the Argentine Republic on 20 July 2023.

=== Failed bids ===
Chile: The Dhruv participated in a Chilean tender for eight to ten twin-engined helicopters, conducting a series of evaluation flights to demonstrate the capabilities of its avionics and flight performance; however, it lost out to the Bell 412, although there were media accusations of unfair pressure being exercised by the US Government to favour Bell.

=== Former operators ===
==== Ecuador ====
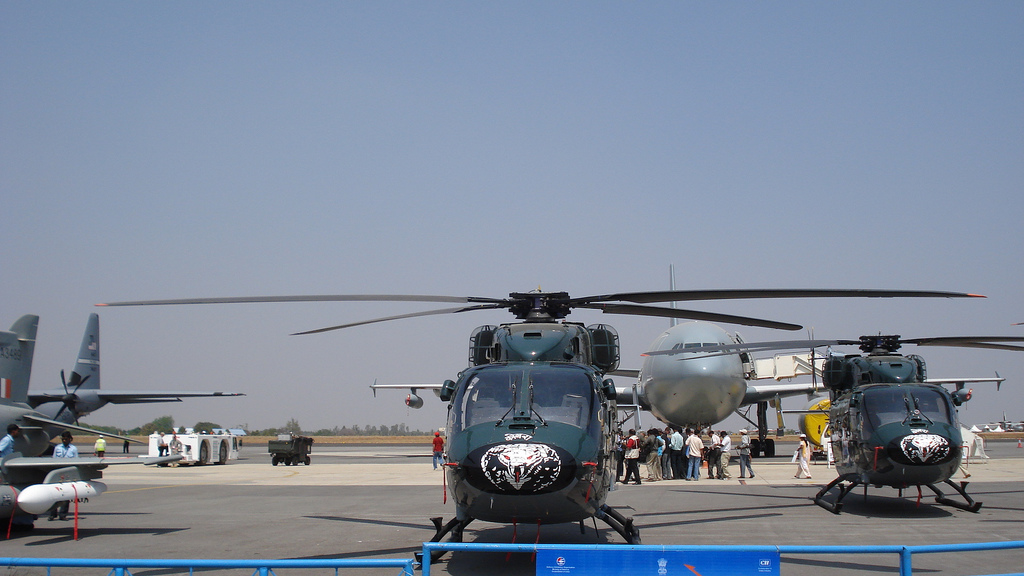
Dhruv helicopters of the Ecuadorian Air Force

HAL has secured an order from the Ecuadorian Air Force (FAE) for seven Dhruvs, amidst strong competition from Elbit, Eurocopter and Kazan. HAL's offer of US$50.7 million was about 32 percent lower than the second lowest bid from Elbit. Five helicopters were delivered in February 2009, during Aero India 2009. Both the Ecuadorian Army and Ecuadorian Navy have since expressed interest in the Dhruvs. The Dhruv has been involved in search and rescue, transport, and MEDEVAC missions in the north of the country. The pilots were trained in India.

Following the crash of one Dhruv of the five delivered in October 2009, Ecuador reportedly considered returning their six helicopters to HAL amid claims of being unfit for service; EAF commander Genl. Rodrigo Bohorquez stated "If it is a major problem that can't be easily remedied, we would have to return [the Dhruv]." HAL assisted the crash investigation, which found the cause to be pilot error. The other two were to be delivered in May 2010, but the deliveries were completed in 2012.

In February 2011, the EAF were reported to be satisfied with the Dhruv's performance and was considering further orders. By October 2015, a total of four Ecuadorian Dhruvs had crashed reportedly due to mechanical equipment and Ecuador grounded the type. In October 2015 Ecuador cancelled the contract and withdrew the surviving helicopters from service, non-delivery of parts and high accident rate were cited. In 2016, the Ecuadorian Minister of Defense Ricardo Patiño announced that the remainder of the HAL Dhruv helicopters of the Ecuadorian Air Force, which are stored at the Guayaquil Air Base are for sale and that the Air Force is looking for potential buyers. The Government of Ecuador had unilaterally terminated the contract with HAL citing safety concerns of the helicopters. A HAL spokesman said that while maintenance was supposed to be done by the EAF due to the warranty period being expired, the company was willing to assist them to make sure that the Dhruvs were operational. Quito declined further assistance.

== Variants ==
=== Military variants ===
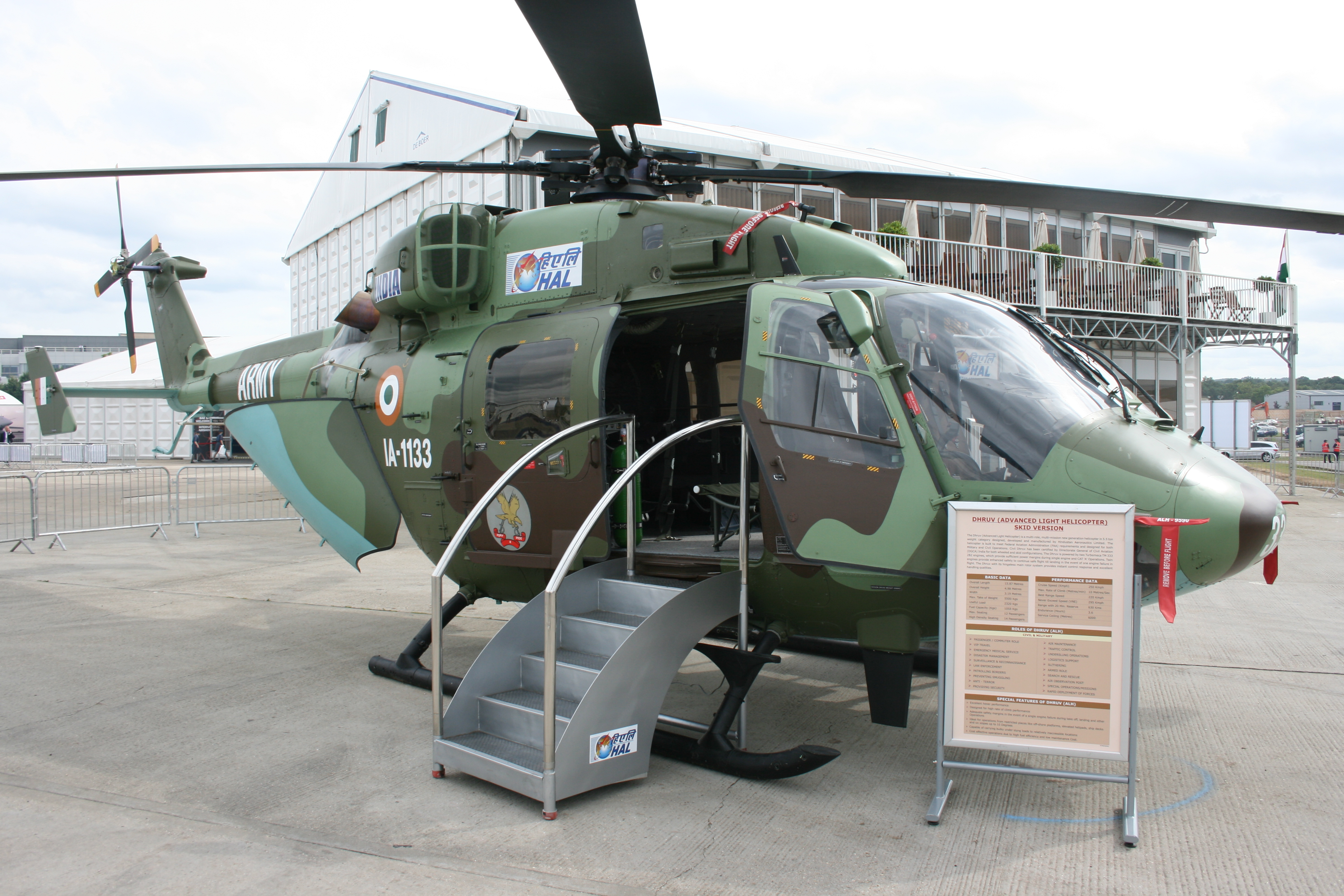
Indian Army HAL Dhruv (serial IA-1133) on display at the 2008 Farnborough Airshow

Mk.1
The initial configuration with a conventional cockpit with mechanical gauges and Turbomeca TM 333-2B2 turboshaft engines. A total of 56 have been delivered to the Indian military. Manufacturing began in 2001.
Mk.2
Similar to the Mk.1, except has the newer HAL-IAI glass cockpit. Manufacturing had commenced in 2007. A total of 20 have been delivered to the Indian military.
Mk.3
An improved version equipped with Shakti-1H engines, new electronic warfare (EW) suite and warning systems, automatic chaff and flare dispensers, Saab Integrated Architecture Display System (IADS) with Digital Moving Map, Electro Optical pod, infrared suppressor, health & usage monitoring system, Solid State Digital Video Recorder (SSDVR), Engine Particle Separator and improved vibration control system. The first batch were inducted into service in 2012.

Mk. 3 MR (Marine Reconnaissance)

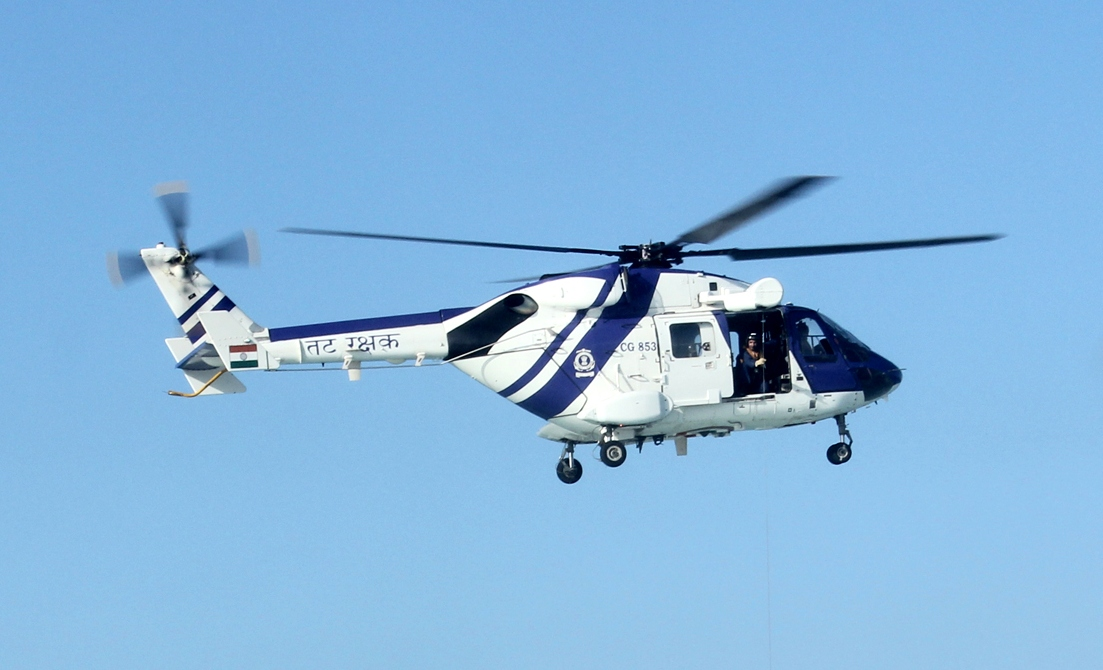
HAL Dhruv operated by Indian Coast Guard

The contract for 32 Dhruv copters for the Navy and Coast Guard was contracted to include 19 additional systems. This included a nose-mounted modern surveillance radar and electro-optical equipment to carry out maritime reconnaissance as well as long-range search and rescue missions, an HMG and the capability to mount at least 2 ASW torpedoes. The radar has a range of 120 nmi (220 km) provides 270° field of view and delivers the functions of synthetic-aperture radar, inverse synthetic-aperture radar as well as moving target indication and classification. The radar is coupled with an electro-optical sensor, the EO POD Rev III, with a 30 nmi (56 km) range to detect every type of vessels. Other systems include High Intensity Search Light and a loud hailer, a 12.7 mm heavy machine gun with a range of 1,800 m (5,900 ft), IFF MKXII and an automatic identification system (AIS) among others. It also features a removable medical intensive care unit (MICU) to undertake medical evacuation (MEDEVAC) role.

Mk.4
Also known as ALH-WSI (Weapons System Integrated) or HAL Rudra

=== Utility Helicopter-Marine ===
HAL is currently developing an advanced derivative of the ALH Dhruv to address the specific needs of the Indian Navy. The helicopter is to be purpose-built for ship-borne roles including utility and maritime search and rescue.

The UH-M programme has its origin from the Navy's Naval Utility Helicopter (NUH) acquisition programme. The Navy issued a requirement of 111 units of utility helicopters. The Defence Acquisition Council (DAC) – the highest decision-making body under the Ministry of Defence (MoD) chaired by the Minister of Defence, then Nirmala Sitharaman – accorded the Acceptance of Necessity (AoN) to the programme on 25 August 2018. The cost of the programme was estimated at ₹21,000 crore (equivalent to ₹310 billion or US$3.3 billion in 2026). The requirement would be fulfilled through the Strategic Partnership (SP) model including an Indian and a foreign Original Equipment Manufacturer (OEM) under the Make in India initiative.

The Expression of Interest (EoI) to foreign OEMs and domestic Strategic Partners had been issued on 12 February 2019. However, the category was included in the third "positive indigenisation list" by the MoD on 7 April 2022, eliminating direct participation by any foreign vendor. The Navy had issued the broad requirement of 60 ALH-based helicopters to HAL in January 2022. A detailed project report for helicopter configuration, overall cost, including performance based logistics was being prepared for the Navy HQ and MoD. This resulted in the concept of Utility Helicopter-Marine.

Hence, HAL had carried out a joint study of ALH Dhruv to increase the MTOW to 5.7 tonnes, reduce the empty weight and increase the overall payload capacity to 600 kg. The modifications also included "reduced stowage dimensions to meet requirement with foldable two segment blades and modified upper control system and Aircraft Ship Integrated Secure and Traverse (ASIST) traversing interface for ship deck." The programme is to replace the Navy's ageing Chetak fleet. The Indian Navy is to place an order of at least 50 helicopters in the first phase. The maritime wheeled version of Dhruv having segmented Main Rotor Blades (MRBs) and Main Rotor Head (MRH) in pre-cone configuration completed its first flight on 30 June 2022. By March 2023, tail boom folding has been demonstrated. Reportedly, the UH-M will also showcase anti-ship missile and torpedo firing capability.

On 16 March 2023, the Defence Acquisition Council (DAC) approved the Utility Helicopter-Maritime programme for the Indian Navy.

On 20 October 2024, a report from The Economic Times revealed that the prototype of Utility Helicopters-Marine (UH-M) helicopter is under construction while the first flight is expected by May 2025. Its multirole capabilities will include transportation of personnel, cargo delivery and CASEVAC. Simultaneously, the new technologies developed for the new helicopter is also being tested on a testbed. The design is mostly based on the earlier Dhruv and includes extensive modifications to fit inside a ship-based hangar. The modifications includes foldable tail boom as well as foldable rotor blades and a nose-mounted surveillance radar. The Navy needs 111 of these helicopters.

As of 11 May 2025, the design of the helicopter is almost completed with first flight and deliveries expected by early 2026 and 2027, respectively. In September, HAL released a tender in search for a company to co-develop an AESA radar for the UH-M helicopter. The radar is meant to operate in multiple modes including Sea Surveillance, Maritime Multi-Target Tracking, Weather Detection with Colour Classification Display for Weather, Inverse Synthetic Aperture Radar and SART/Beacon mode for search and rescue operations. HAL's Strategic Electronic Research Design Centre (SLRDC) will be responsible for the radar's design, development and integration in the UH-M.

In February 2026, Centum Electronics was reported to have won the tender. The Phase-1 contract is worth ₹66 crore (US$7.1 million) and includes the design and development of the radar over two years. Meanwhile, the Phase-2 contract is worth ₹500 crore (US$53 million) and includes the serial production and supply over five years.

The first flight of the helicopter was scheduled to be conducted by November 2026 with the first prototype ready by September.

=== Civil variants ===
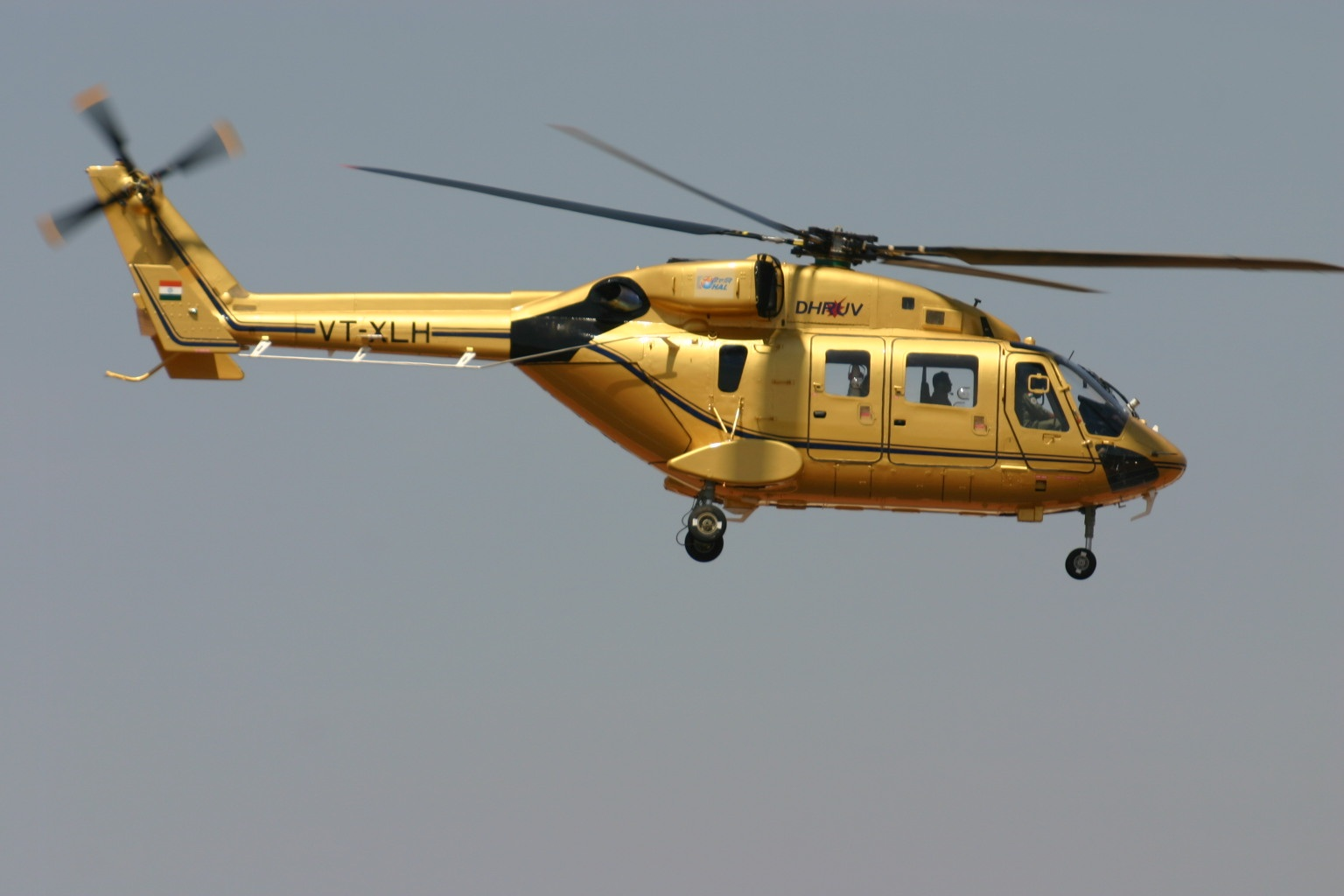
Dhruv civil variant

Dhruv (C)
Also known as ALH-Civil, a Turbomeca TM333-2B2-powered 12-seat helicopter with retractable landing gear, type certificate issued on 31 October 2003.
Dhruv (CFW)
A Turbomeca TM333-2B2-powered 12-seat helicopter fitted with wheels, type certificate issued on 20 April 2005.
Dhruv (CS)
A Turbomeca TM333-2B2-powered 12-seat helicopter fitted with skids, type certificate issued on 30 July 2004.
Dhruv NG
14-seater civilian variant of Dhruv Mk-3 equipped with two Shakti-1H1C engines and civil-certified glass cockpit, along with major flight safety upgrades. First flight: 30 December 2025. It is designed for VIP transport, general passenger operations, HEMS (air ambulance) missions, and specialised roles including operational support, law enforcement, and disaster relief (search and rescue). Specifications:
- Maximum takeoff weight: 5,500 kg
- Internal payload: 1,000 kg
- Maximum speed: 285 km/h
- Range: 630 km (20 min reserve)
- Endurance: 3 hours 40 minutes
- Service ceiling: 6,000 m
Garuda Vasudha
A Dhruv outfitted with a heliborne geophysical survey system (HGSS) from Pico Envirotec Inc, Canada.

== Operators ==
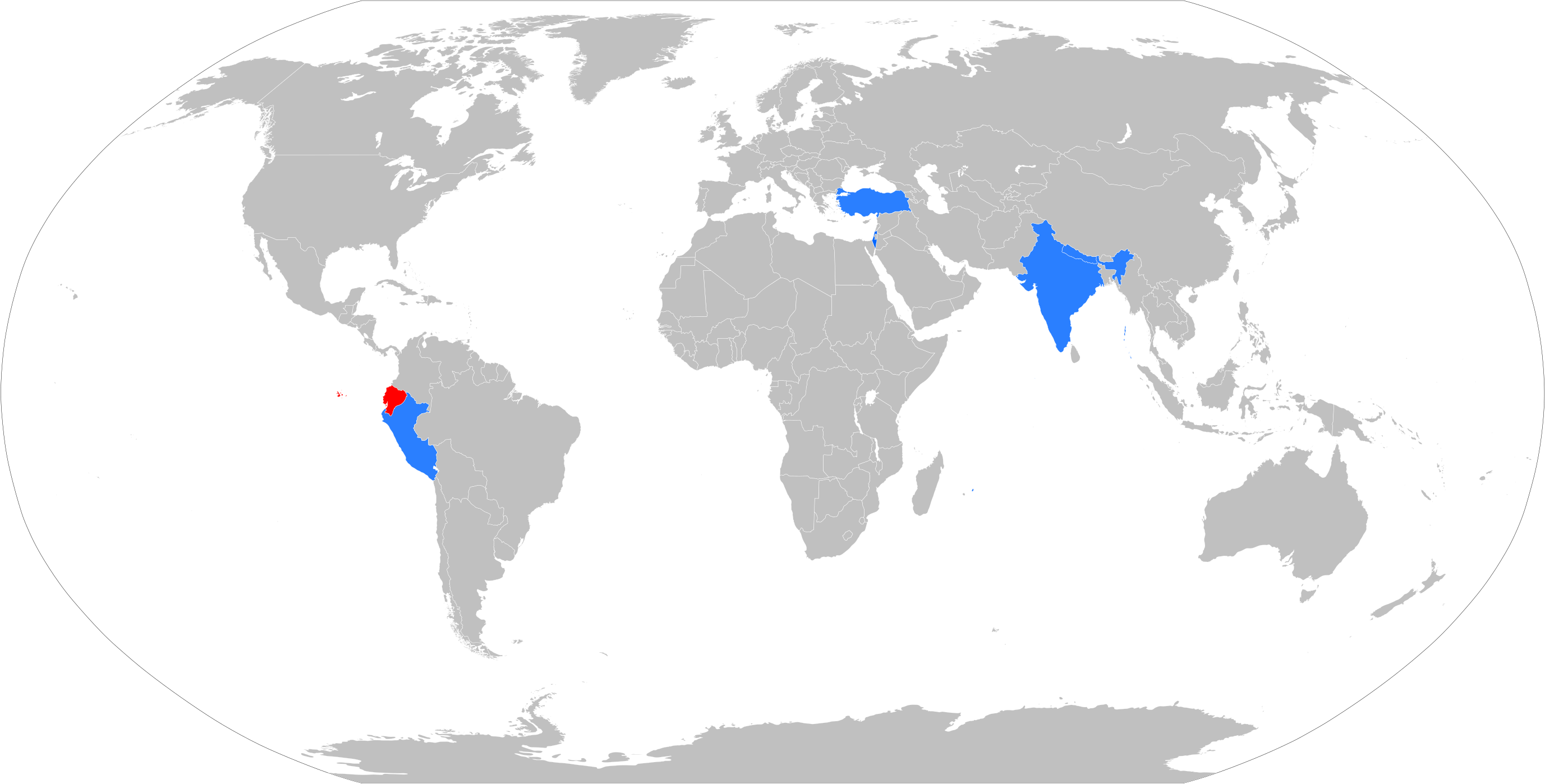
Map of Dhruv operators in blue, former operator(s) in red

=== Military operators ===
- India
  - Indian Air Force: 95
  - Indian Army Aviation Corps: 76 (19 more on order)
  - Indian Navy: 24
  - Indian Coast Guard: 24 delivered (4 Mk1; 20 Mk3). 20 operational as of April 2026 (11 Mk3 on order in two batches)
  - Border Security Force: 8 delivered; 6 operational.
- Israel
  - Ministry of Defense: 1 leased (2007)
- Maldives
  - National Defence Force: 2 in service
- Mauritius
  - Mauritius Police Force: 3 in service
- Nepal
  - Nepalese Army Air Service: 1 in service

==== Former military operators ====
Ecuador

- Ecuadorian Air Force: 7 delivered, 4 crashed between October 2009 to January 2015 (withdrawn from service in 2015)

=== Civil operators ===
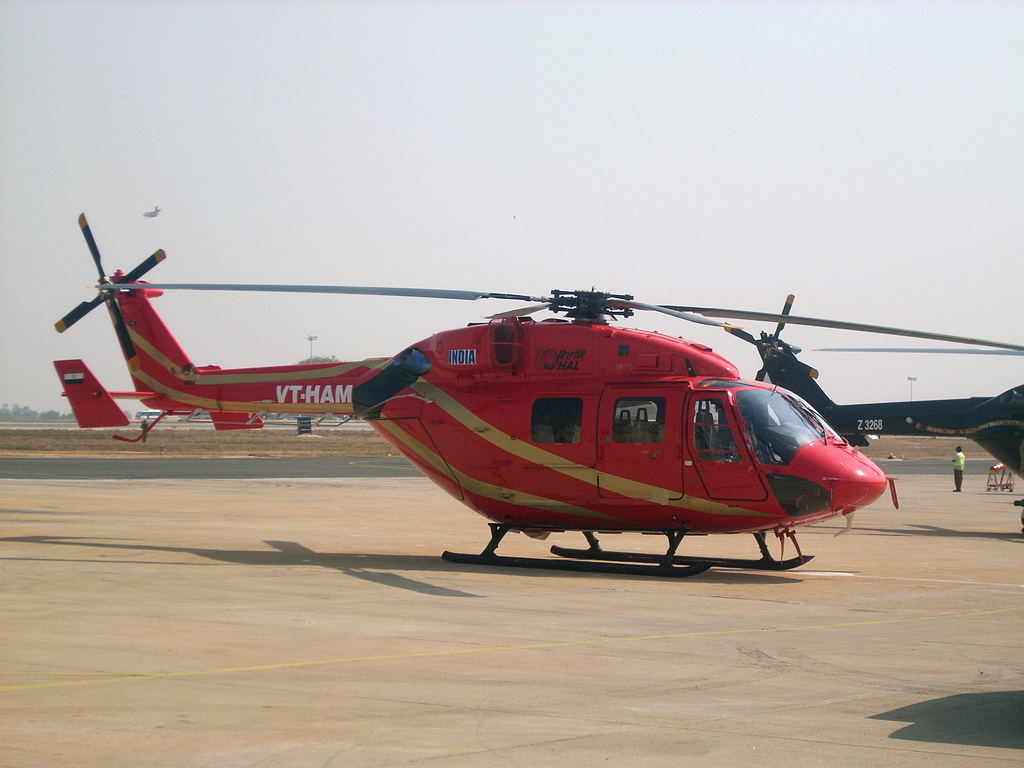
ALH Dhruv air ambulance in Bengaluru, India

India

- Oil and Natural Gas Corporation: 3 civil variants
- Chhattisgarh State Government
- Jharkhand State Government: 2 civil variants.
- Karnataka State Government: 1 on lease.
- Geological Survey of India: 1 Garuda Vasudha variant
- Pawan Hans: 10 Dhruv NG ordered, 4 delivered with 6 to be delivered by 2027. Over 28 planned. Four to be operated on behalf of ONGC for 10 years.

Turkey

- Turkish Health Services: 3

Peru

- Peruvian Health Services: 2

== Accidents and incidents ==
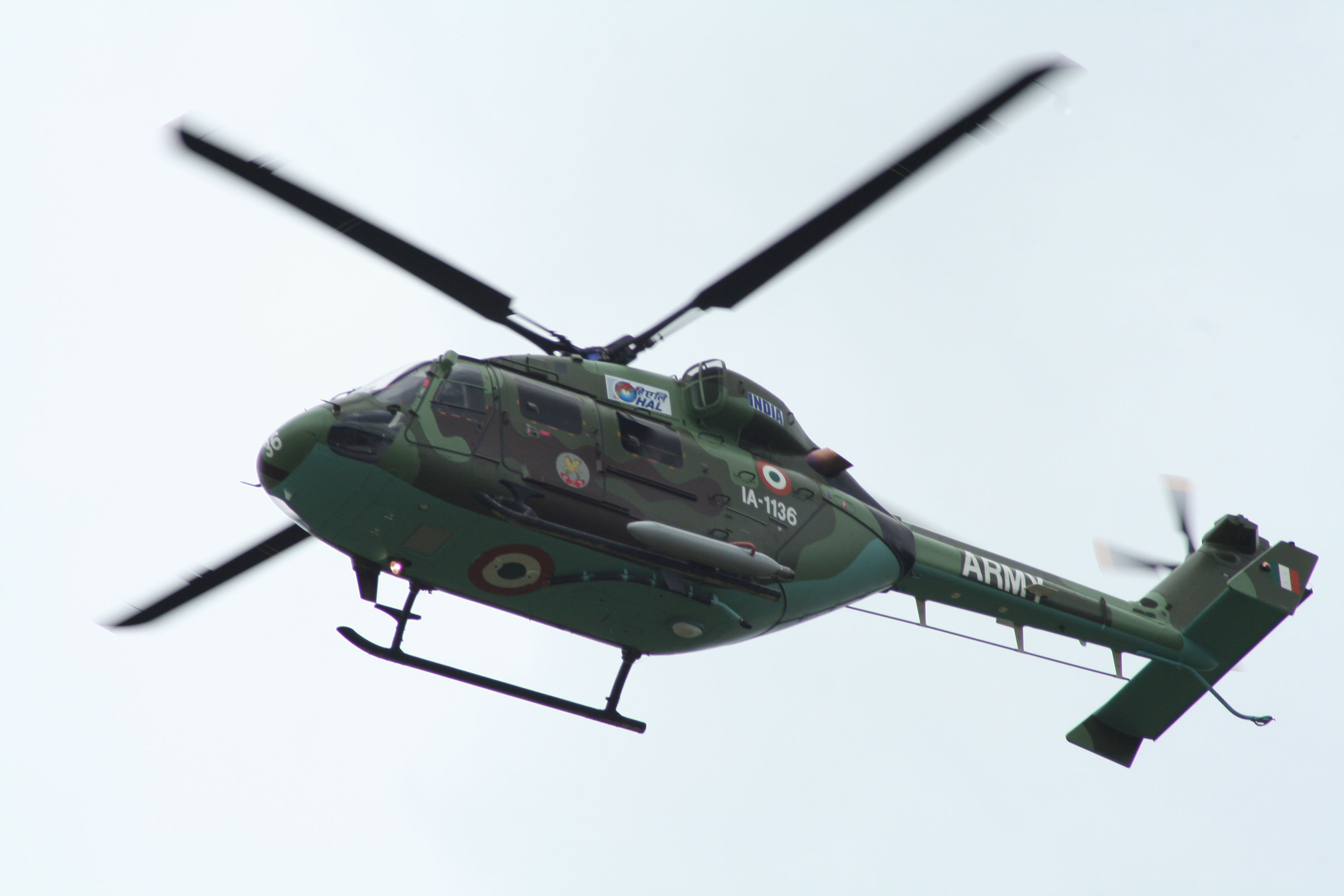
HAL Dhruv of the Indian Army performing at the Farnborough Air Show 2008.

As reported by the Indian Government to Parliament on 8 March 2016, there were 16 accidents involving HAL Dhruv. "Out of 16 accidents, 12 occurred due to human error and environmental factors and the remaining four occurred due to technical reasons," Minister of State for Defence Rao Inderjit Singh informed the Rajya Sabha. The crash involved two civilian, nine Indian military and five foreign operated helicopters. As for the four Ecuadorian Dhruv crahes, two were due to human errors, one due to mechanical error.

Further, four Dhruv and two Rudra helicopters were lost between March 2017 and December 2021.

As of January 2025, 20 to 23 ALHs were lost in 23 years of service leading to a death of 17 pilots excluding passengers. A total of around 410 units have been produced. While the Indian Army and Air Force have lost of 16 and six helicopters, respectively, the Coast Guard has lost three as of December 2025.

=== 2004–22 ===
- November 2004: An ALH delivered to the Royal Nepalese Army suffered a hard landing which damaged its undercarriage and landing gears. The aircraft was returned to HAL for repairs.
- 25 November 2005: First crash involving an ALH owned by HAL. The helicopter was on its way from Bangalore to Ranchi when it crash-landed in a field near Karimnagar in Andhra Pradesh. The crash was attributed to an expired resin on the tail rotor of the helicopter following an investigation.
- 2 February 2007: The first fatal accident including HAL Dhruv and the Sarang display team when one of the helicopters crashed near Yelahanka Air Force Station during a practice session before Aero India 2007. Co-pilot Squadron Leader Priyesh Sharma was killed and pilot Wing Commander Vikas Jettley was critically injured. Vikas Jettley also succumbed to the injuries in 2011 after being in a comatose state for four years. The crash was attributed to pilot error as per HAL, though the Air Force has denied the claim.
- 27 February 2010: Another helicopter with the Sarang display team was involved in a crash landing in the Jaisalmer district while the team was rehearsing for an air show in the 2010 edition of Exercise Vayushakti. The President and the Defence Minister would be spectators at the air show. The pilots had to make a "controlled crash landing" of the copter due to a sudden power loss at altitude. A court of inquiry was launched and the team's participation in the following day's air show was unclear. However, the team carried out all the aerobatics as planned on 28 February.
- 28 October 2009: A helicopter operated by the Ecuadorian Air Force crashed during a military parade over Mariscal Sucre International Airport, Quito. The data acquired by the flight data recorder and the cockpit voice recorder was brought to Bangalore for investigation. The entire fleet was grounded following the crash. By 15 December, the investigation found that the crash was the result of a pilot error. Two separate probes were undertaken, one was by Ecuador with assistance from the United States and the other by HAL. The Ecuador probe team had the same results.
- 19 October 2011: A Dhruv owned by the Border Security Force (BSF), operated for the Ministry of Home Affairs (MHA) and maintained and operated by the Pawan Hans crashed 40 km (25 mi) from the Khakra village while en route from Ranchi aerodrome to Chaibasa. The pilots, Captain Thomas and Captain S.P. Singh, and technician Manoj Soin was killed in the accident. The aircraft exploded mid-air and disintegrated into parts after falling to the ground. It was the fourth Pawan Hans helicopter to crash within a year. The helicopter took off from 03:09 UTC and crashed after six minutes, around 10 nmi (19 km; 12 mi) from Ranchi. The airframe was lost in the post crash fire. The maintenance of the Pawan Hans was under question since this was the second BSF chopper under the company's operation to crash in 2011.
- 15 January 2012: Another BSF helicopter crashed during a test flight at the Raipur Airport. The chopper fell from an altitude of around 100 ft (30 m) and injured both the pilots, an engineer as well as the two technicians. The five injured were hospitalised where they were declared to be out of danger.
- 25 July 2014: an IAF Dhruv Mk.III of 111 HU carrying two pilots (wing commander T.B.N. Singh and a squadron leader) and five airmen (a junior warrant officer, a sergeant, a leading aircraftman and two corporals) crashed in Sitapur district at around 5 pm, killing all on board. The chopper was en route from Bareilly to Allahabad and a technical glitch was reported to the Lucknow ATC before the tower lost contact. Another IAF helicopter rushed to the spot. The particular chopper had been serviced days before and had flown over 500 hours. IAF had temporarily grounded its 40-strong ALH fleet which restarted operations by August-end. The army's fleet was also grounded for inspection.
- By October 2015, at leat four EAF Dhruvs were lost in crashes after which the service cancelled its contracts with HAL.
- 24 October 2019: An Army Dhruv crash landed near Poonch in Jammu and Kashmir. A crew of eight including the then General Officer Commanding-in-Chief, Northern Command, Lieutenant general Ranbir Singh survived.
- 25 January 2021: an Army Dhruv helicopter crashed due to a technical snag in Kathua district’s Lakhanpur in Jammu and Kashmir, killing one of the pilots.
- 7 March 2021: an Army Dhruv made an emergency landing in Kheda district in Gujarat. Two 3-star officers including Army Training Command head Lt Gen. Raj Shukla and Indian Air Force South Western Air Command Chief Air Marshal S.K. Ghotia and four other officers were onboard. Everyone survived as a precautionary landing was conducted 30km away from Ahmedabad.

=== 2023–26 ===
- 8 March 2023: A Mark III naval variant made an emergency water landing off the coast of Mumbai, prompting the navy to ground the aircraft pending further investigation. All three crew members were rescued. Before the crash, the crew experienced a "sudden loss of power and rapid loss of height". The crash led to the grounding of the entire 330 Dhruv fleet of the Indian Armed Forces as well as the Coast Guard. A problem with control rods were identified. Only few units of the Army until April were cleared for flight before another accident took place.
- 26 March 2023: An Indian Coast Guard ALH Dhruv Mark III helicopter crashed during soon after takeoff from a height of 25 ft near the main runway at Kochi Airport. Three Coast Guard servicemen on board survived with minor injuries.
- 2 October 2024: An Indian Air Force ALH air-dropping relief material in flood-hit Bihar made a forced landing in a swamp following engine failure. All four crew were rescued.
- 13 November 2026: An Indian Air Force ALH (registered ZD 4050) made an emergency landing on a farm land beside National Highway 48 in the Kamanahalli village of Shiggaon taluk, Haveri district, Karnataka while en route from Sulur to Belgaum while carrying six personnel including IAF officer Deepak Sharma. There were no casualties.

=== Groundings ===
In January 2006, the entire fleet of 46 ALHs was grounded due to reports of technical snags. HAL representatives were visiting all the airbases where the helicopters were stationed to certify their airworthiness, with two examples already being cleared for operations.

The entire fleet of six helicopters of the Border Security Force (BSF), under the Ministry of Home Affairs (MHA), was grounded after one of its ALH crashed after departing from Ranchi in October 2012. The fleet was being used by the Central Reserve Police Force (CRPF) to support the anti-naxalite operations. The CRPF had asked both HAL, the manufacturer, and Pawan Hans, the operator. In October 2011, The Telegraph reported that a spate of helicopter crashes, including the Dhruv, were alleged to have been caused by low quality maintenance work performed by Pawan Hans Helicopters Ltd. The maintenance of the Pawan Hans was under question since this was the sixth helicopter and the second BSF chopper under the company's operation to crash in 2011, the BSF's first being an HAL Chetak that crashed on 31 May. However, the MHA was dependent on the company due to the otherwise very expensive pilot training.

==== 2023 grounding ====
A Dhruv of the Indian Army Northern Command on an operational deployment made a hard landing on the banks of Marua river in Kishtwar region of Jammu and Kashmir at 11:15 am IST on 4 May 2023. Two pilots were injured while Craftsmen (Aviation Technician) Pabballa Anil succumbed to his injuries. A technical fault was reported by the pilots to the ATC. The incident occurred while attempting a precautionary landing. The hard landing was attributed to undulating ground, undergrowth and unprepared landing area. At that time, it marked the third accident involving Dhruv in a 2-month span.

The series of accidents resulted the mean time between checks for the helicopters to be brought down from 600 hours of flight to 300 and a further plan to 100–150. On 6 May, the Army's Dhruv fleet was again grounded as a precautionary measure because this accident was not due to control rods like the previous incidents. Only IAF and ICG had a small batch of Dhruv flying as of then while the mean time between checks was down to 100 flying hours. The aluminium booster control rods, which were found to be the main reason of these accidents, are being replaced by steel ones. According to reports, the collective control rod has been replaced in the entire helicopter fleet while that of the other two rods (lateral and longitudinal) in the ALH fleet is underway, and is planned to be completed by end of June 2024.

==== 2024 crash ====
An Indian Coast Guard Dhruv Mk 3 (CG 863) of 835 Squadron conducted an emergency landing in the Arabian Sea at night on 2 September 2024, when deployed for medical evacuation of a seriously injured crew on board Indian-flagged motor tanker Hari Leela about 45 km from Porbandar. The helicopter was launched at around 2300 hrs IST and crash landed at 2315 hrs while approaching the motor tanker ship. The injured crew was rescued by an ICG ship afterwards. The same helicopter had rescued 67 people in a recent cyclonic weather in Gujarat. Of the two pilots and two divers on the helicopter, one diver, Gautam Kumar, was rescued by a search and rescue team and the search for the others went on. The wreckage was also found. The search and rescue team deployed included four ships and two aircraft of the ICG and two specialised ships and diving ships of the Navy. Later, two bodies were recovered. They were later disclosed as pilot Vipin Babu and diver Karan Singh. After the incident, ICG grounded the Dhruv fleet for inspection. As of 6 September, the search for the captain continued along with the process of salvaging the helicopter. The average depth of search and rescue ops was 55 m. On 10 October, the remains of Commandant Rakesh Kumar Rana, the captain of the helicopter, was located and recovered about 55 km from southwest of Porbandar after a total of more than 70 air sorties and 82 ship days of search efforts by the ICG and the Indian Navy. He was cremated with full military honours the next day. This culminated the massive search operation.

==== January 2025 crash and fleetwide grounding ====
On 5 January 2025, an Indian Coast Guard Dhruv crashed in an open field at CGAE Porbandar, Gujarat and burst into flames. Both the pilots, who were Qualified Flying Instructors, and the aircrew driver lost their lives in the incident. An inquiry was launched to investigate the cause of the crash. This was the third incident involving the Dhruv in four months. The crashed helicopter had been inducted in June 2021 and "had completed one 90-minute training sortie, with the crew undertaking running change for the next sortie. While hovering at around 200-feet, the ALH then crashed nose down and burst into flames". The FDR (flight data recorder) and CVR (cockpit voice recorder) of the chopper were being analysed under HAL and ICG's independent investigations and the Dhruv fleet (including HAL Rudra) was re-grounded again. The helicopter did not respond to pilot's command for 3–4 seconds before crashing. On 11 January, HAL also asked for grounding of the civilian Dhruv fleet.

CSIR-NAL confirmed on 4 February that the malfunctioning of the swashplate — a component of the transmission system — made the aircraft unresponsive. This is the first instance of such failure. A defect investigation committee (DIC), including members from CEMILAC, HAL and Directorate General of Aeronautical Quality Assurance (DGAQA), was formed to identify whether the issue originated from quality, inspection, or maintenance. The wreckage was moved to CSIR-NAL, and the committee was to report within four weeks. Fleet-wide checks conducted in April found cracks in swashplate assemblies of several Navy and ICG Dhruvs, likely due to saline-environment operations. The same defect has been reported to have caused the ICG crash. The aluminum-alloy raw material was sent to Indian Institute of Science (IISc) for fatigue testing, with results due by April-end for inclusion in the DIC report expected in May. The fleet could remain grounded beyond three months depending on whether checks can be done in the field or if each helicopter's integrated dynamic system must go to HAL, especially if a design flaw is found. On 23 April, the Indian Army gave limited clearance for the operation of its HAL Dhruv fleet for counterterrorism operations amid 2025 Pahalgam attack and 2025 India–Pakistan conflict. On 1 May, the entire Army and IAF Dhruv fleet was cleared for operations after safety checks. On 11 June, the HAL Prachand fleet was also cleared for operations after replacing few sub-components as suggested by the DIC. The fleet was also grounded following the crash, due to its substantial design heritage from Dhruv. Indian Army and Air Force Dhruvs were cleared to resume full-fledged operations by 26 June after passing all critical tests. However, an instrumented Dhruv each from the Navy and ICG remained under analysis. These were fitted with sensors to record subsystem load data—transmission, gearbox, rotor hub—across varying environments. Analysis was set for completion by end-July. By 14 August, extensive tests of Dhruv was conducted from warships off Visakhapatnam in multiple weather conditions for two weeks to identify the cause of the incidents. The data was analysed by Rotary Wing Research & Design Centre and the compilation had to be submitted to DIC by August-end.

By early September, the necessary rectifications were reportedly identified and HAL was close to the investigation's conclusion. An initial batch of naval helicopters would first undergo modifications and flight trials, followed by the rest. The Non-Rotating Swashplate Bearing (NRSB) was finally identified as the defective component of the swashplate. It NSRB manages the pitch of the rotor blade which is important to provide lift direction and stability of the helicopter. HAL chairman said HAL was not at fault for the other three losses and expects to inspect 4-5 gearboxes a month which implies the fleet's return to full-fledged service within seven months. The helicopters were to receive manufacturing modifications for particular components to improve reactions. The modifications will be implemented in batches and the entire fleet is expected to return to service within six months. The maritime surveillance capability of the ICG was heavily affected due to the groundings and had to be trimmed down to 1980s level. The Indian Navy's Dhruv's were seen to have returned to service during its demonstrations in the International Fleet Review 2026.

== Gallery ==
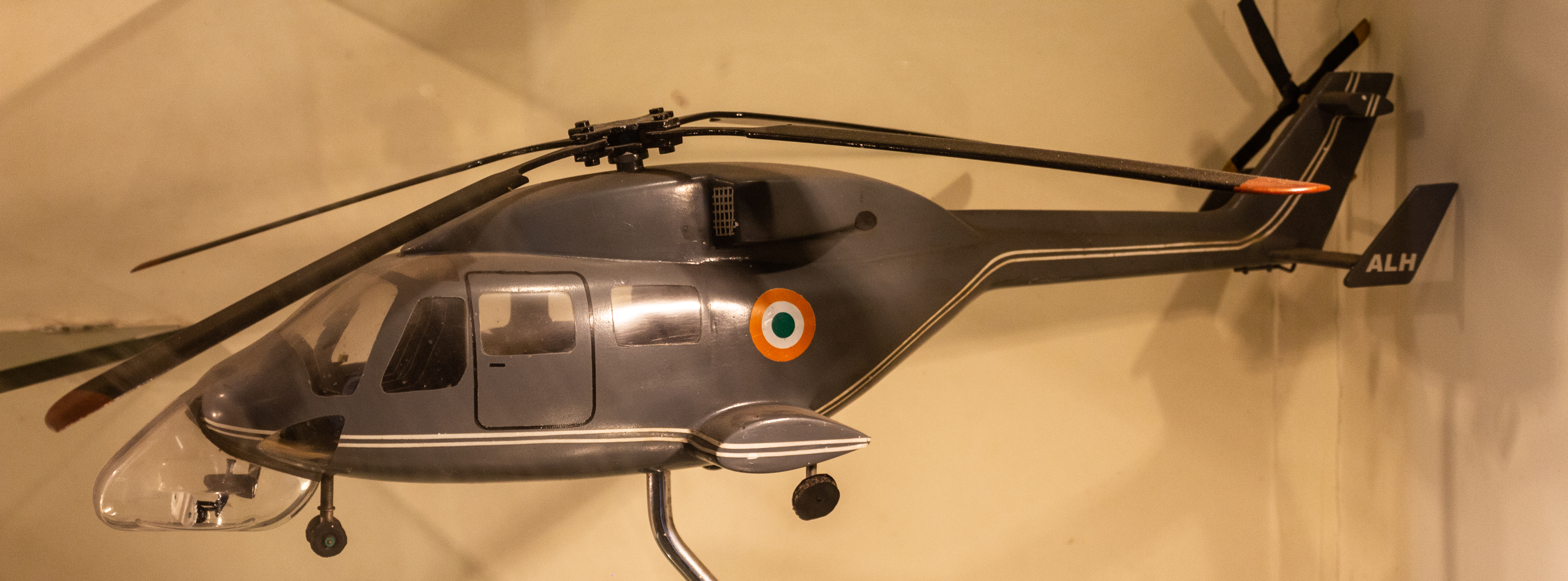
Model of ALH Dhruv

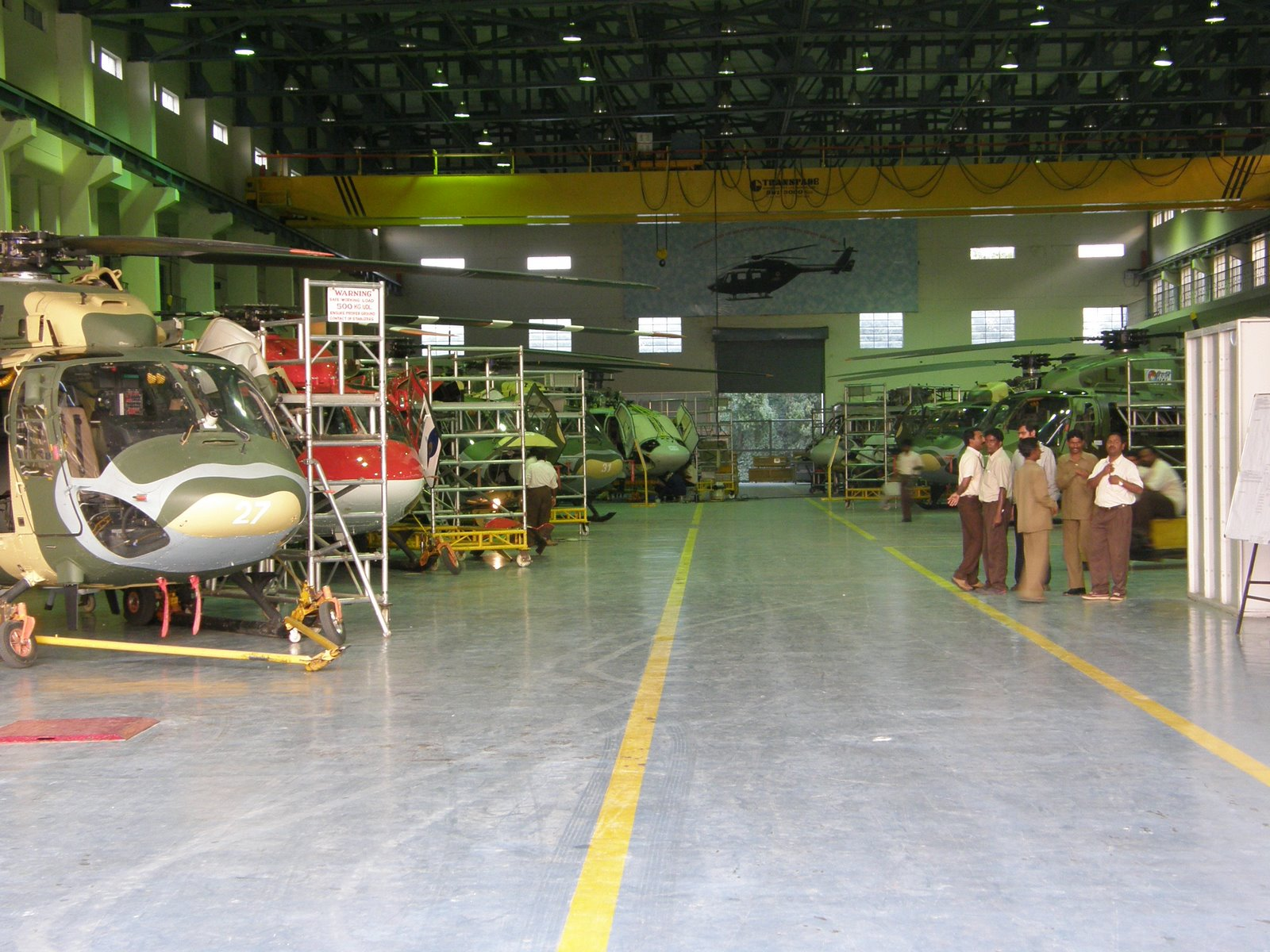
Multiple ALH Dhruvs being prepared for production line

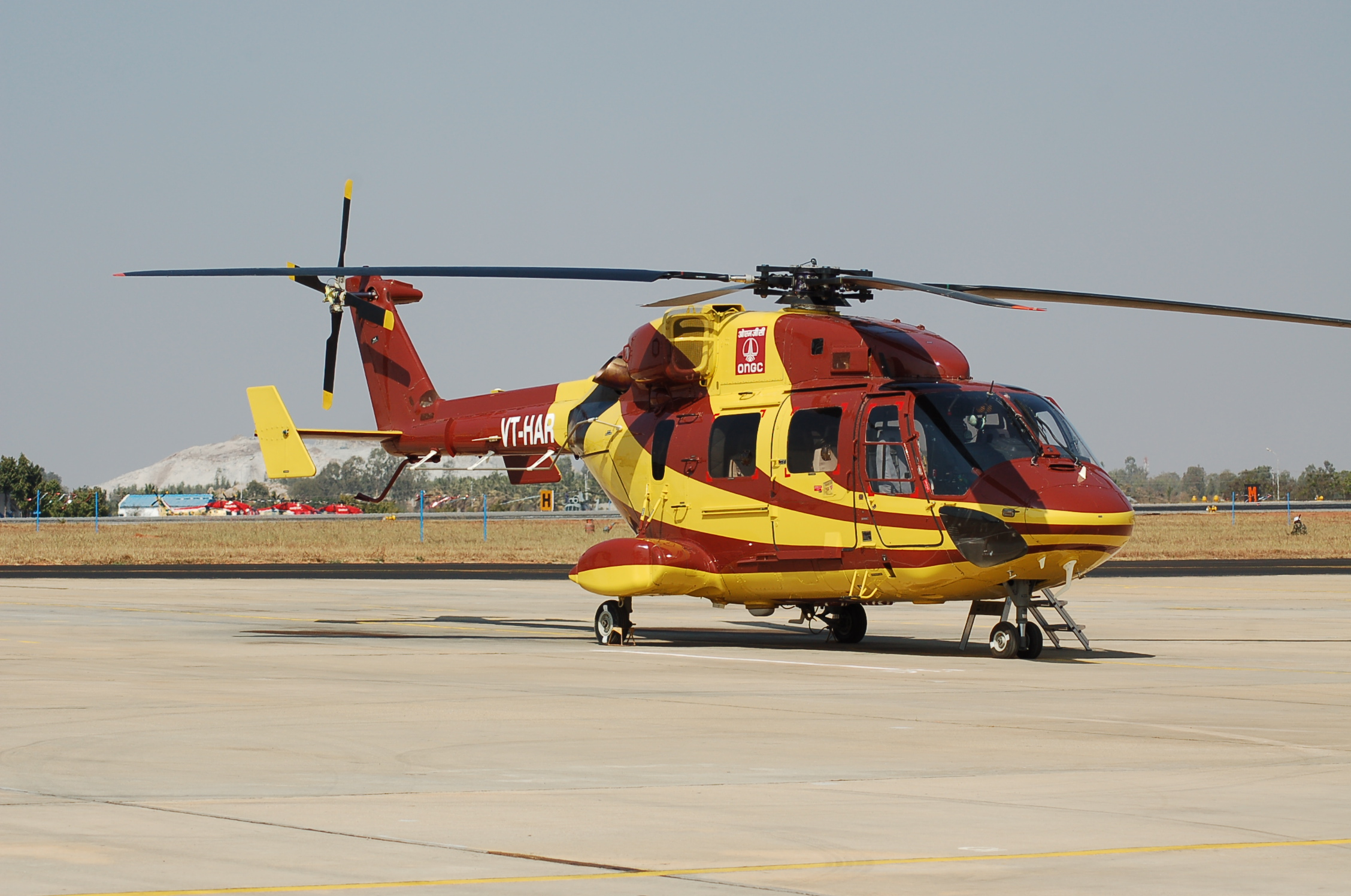
ONGC operated ALH Dhruv (VT-HAR) in air ambulance configuration at Aero India 2007

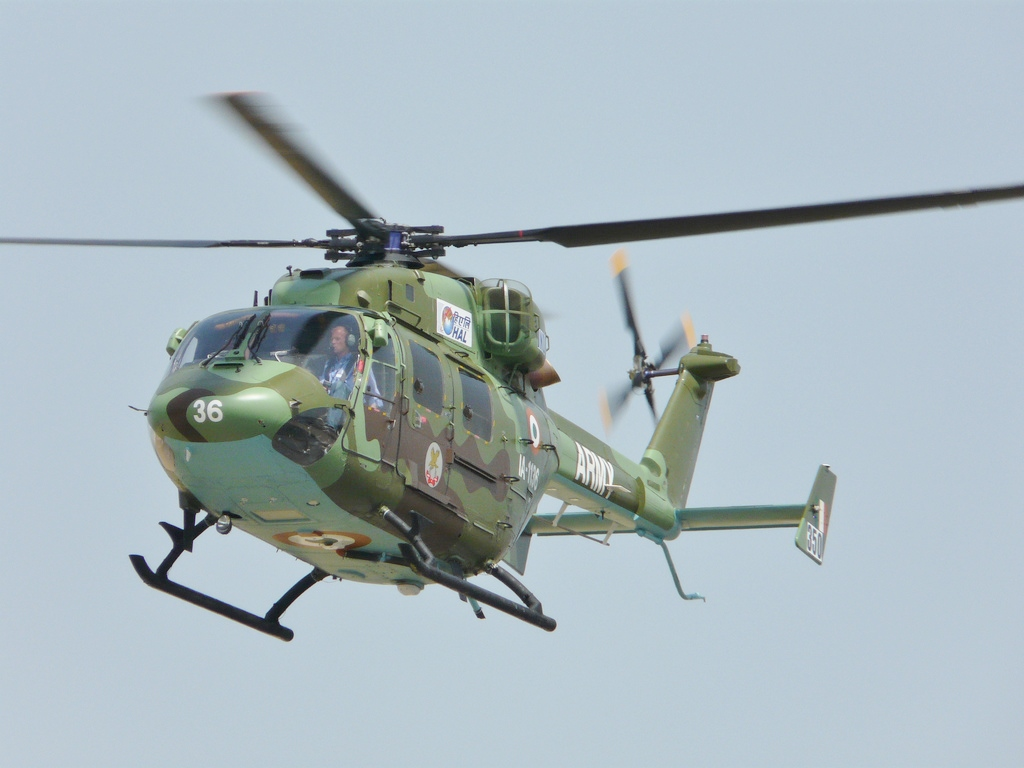
Indian Army operated ALH Dhruv (IA-1136) from 350 Army Aviation Squadron during ILA 2008

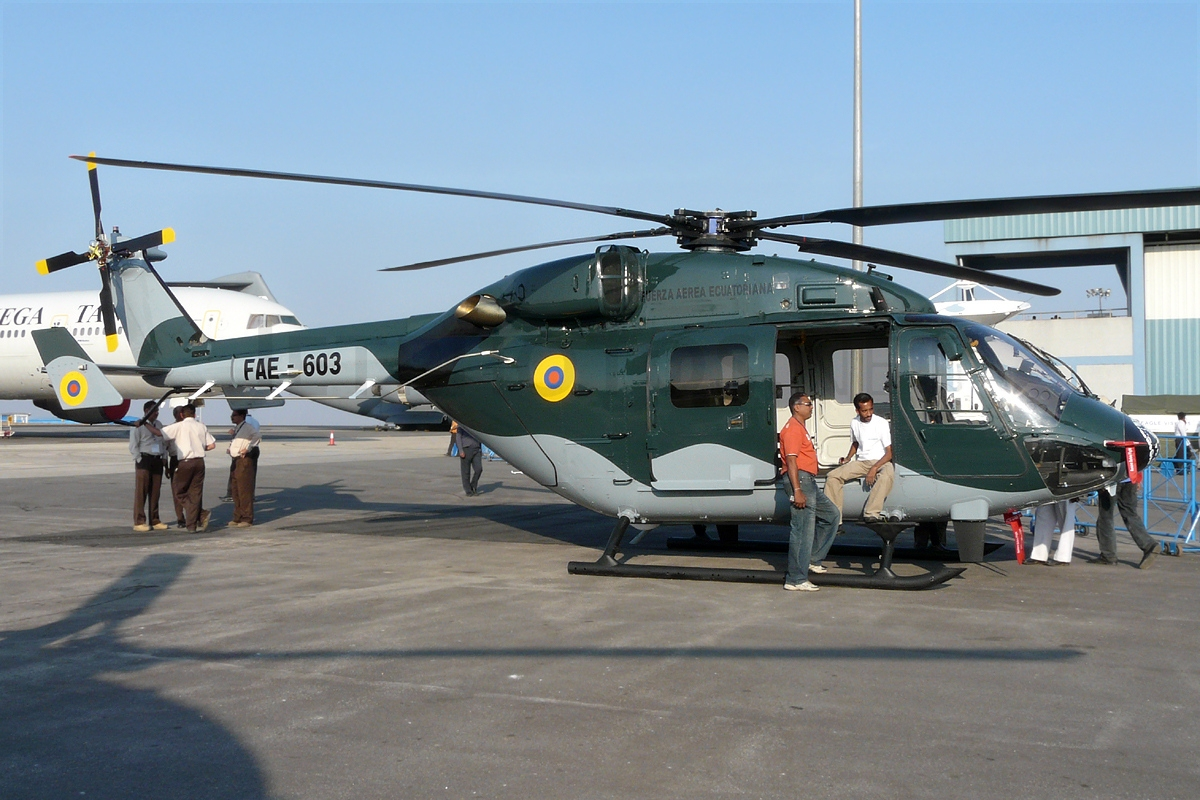
Ecuadorian Air Force operated ALH Dhruv (FAE-603) during Aero India 2009

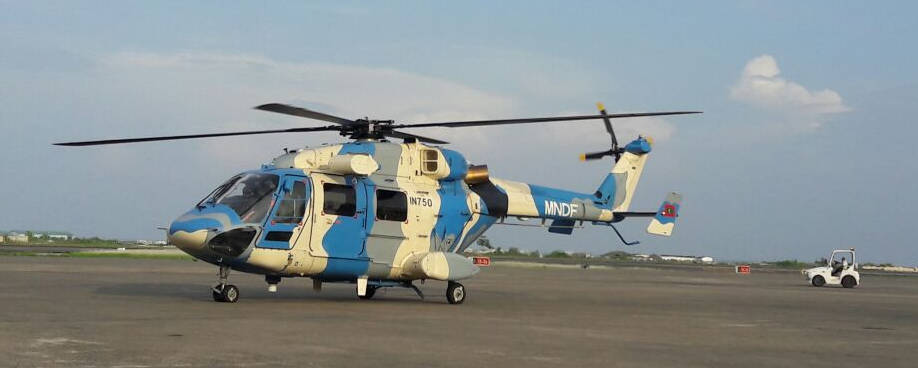
Indian Navy operated HAL Dhruv (IN 750) based at Kadhdhoo to support MNDF operations in 2016

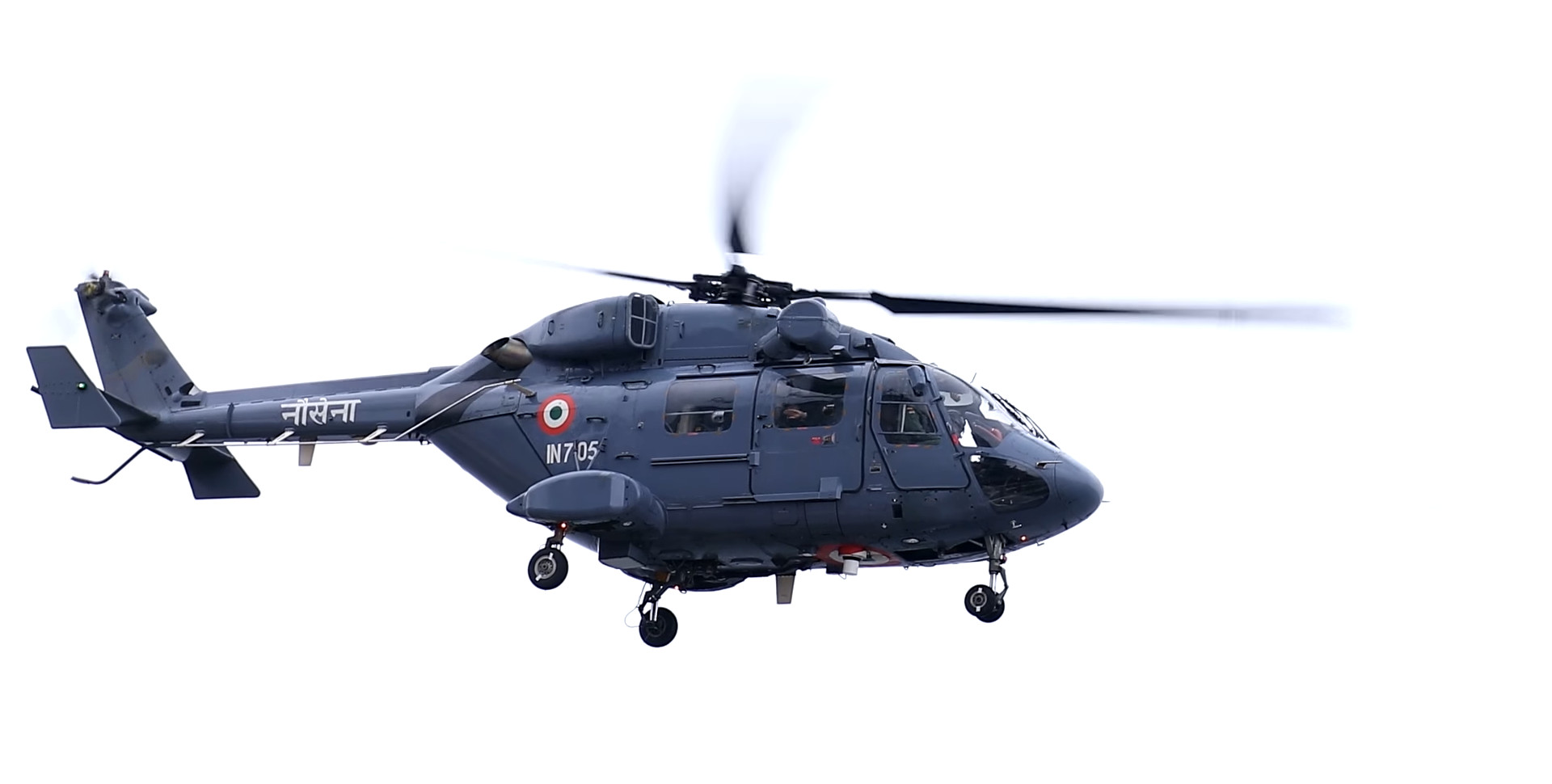
HAL Dhruv (IN 705) taking off from INS Vikramaditya

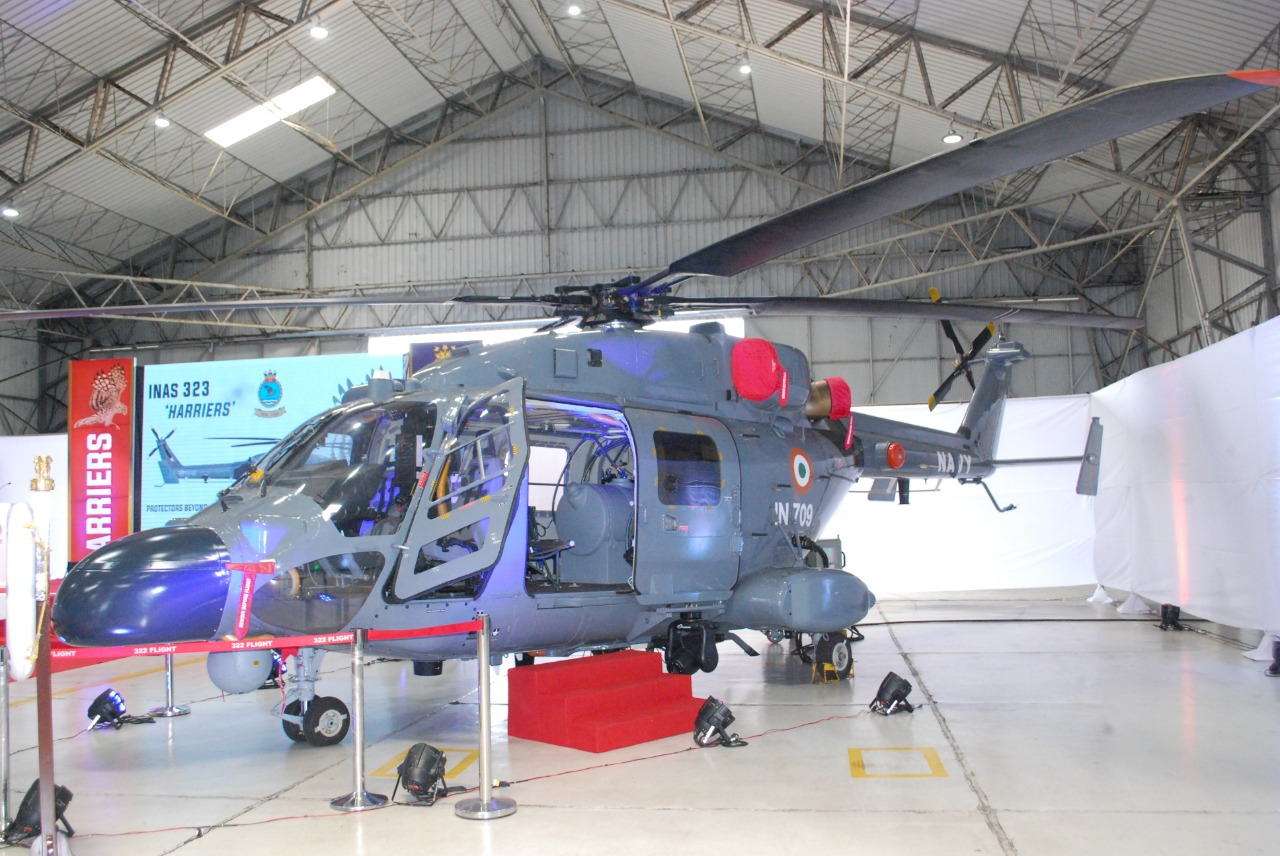
HAL Dhruv Mk III MR of INAS 323 of the Indian Navy at INS Hansa

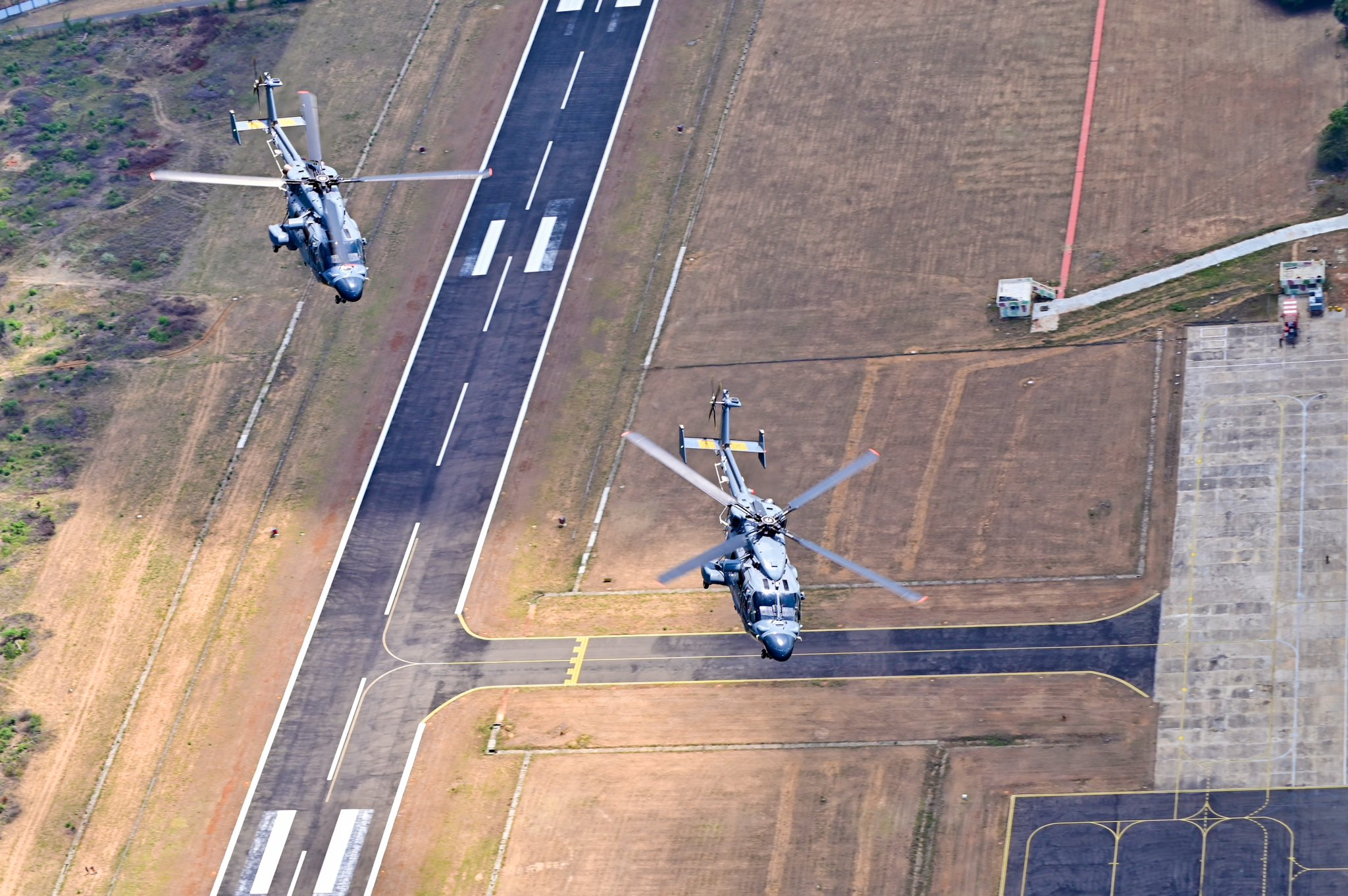
Indian Navy Dhruv Mk III MR from INS Parundu undertaking surveillance over Gulf of Mannar and Palk Bay.

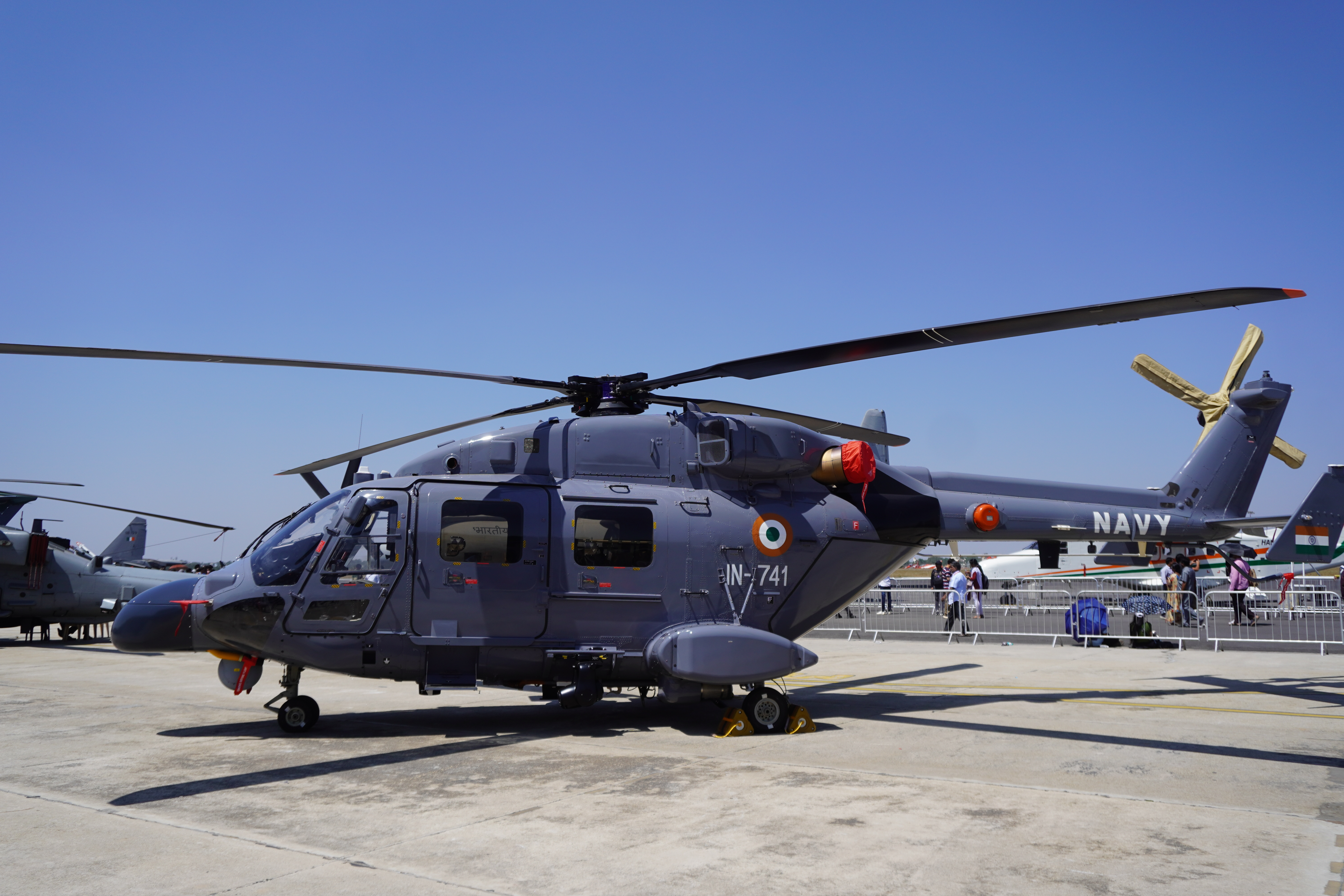
HAL Dhruv Mk III MR during Aero India 2023

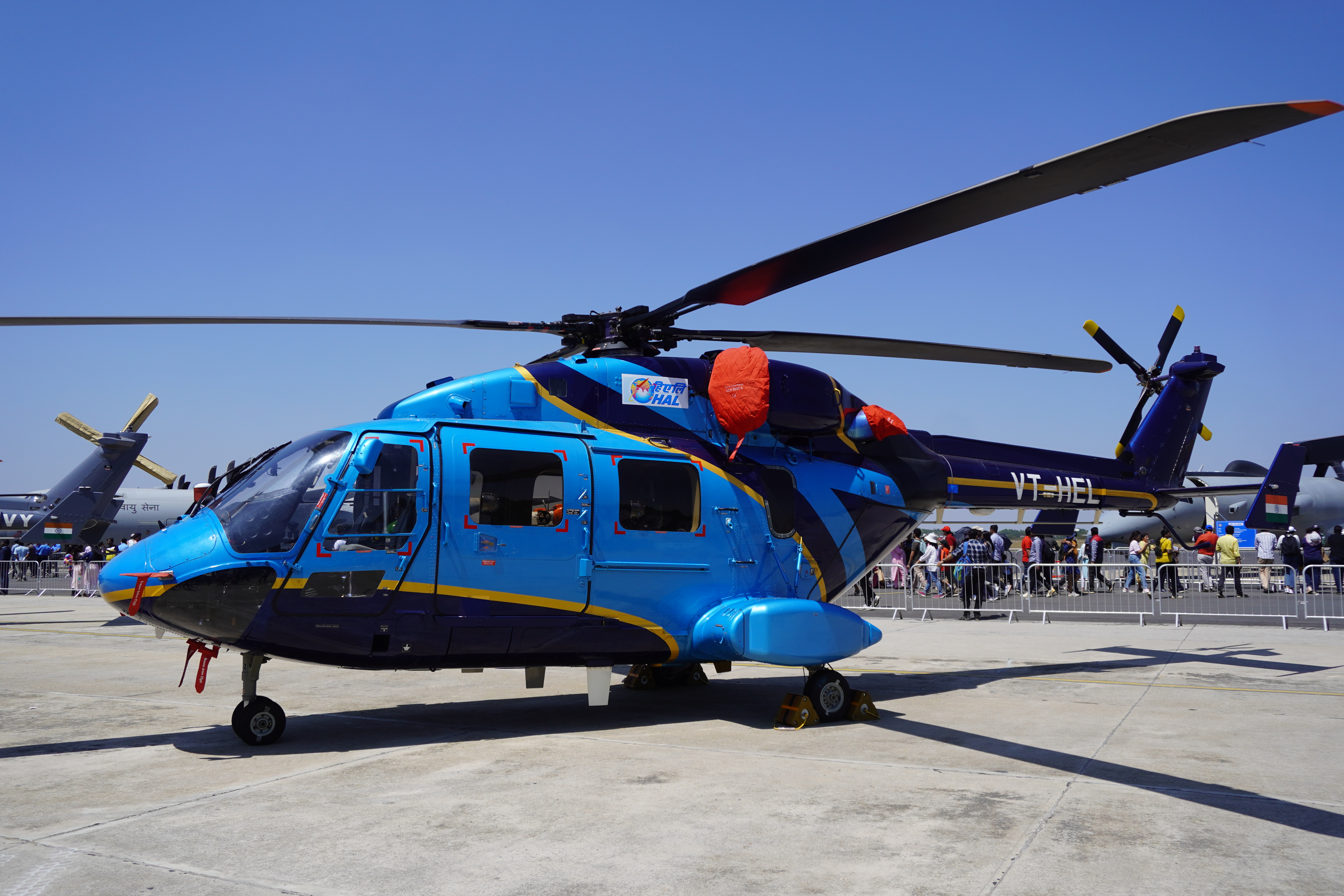
HAL owned and operated ALH Dhruv (VT-HEL) during Aero India 2025

== Specifications ==
Data from Jane's All the World's Aircraft

General characteristics

- Crew: Two pilots
- Capacity: 12 armed troops or 14 passengers
- Length: 15.87 m (52 ft 1 in)
- Width: 3.15 m (10 ft 4 in)
- Height: 4.98 m (16 ft 4 in) with skid landing gear
- Gross weight: 4,445 kg (9,800 lb) for Mk III with wheels
- Max takeoff weight: 5,800 kg (12,787 lb) for Mk III with skids
- Fuel capacity: 1,055 kg (2,326 lb)
- Payload: 1,500 kg (3,300 lb) underslung (Mk II)
- Payload: 1,000 kg (2,200 lb) underslung (Mk III)
- Powerplant: 2 × Turbomeca TM 333-2B2 turboshaft, 807 kW (1,082 shp) each (Mk I and II)
- Powerplant: 2 × HAL/Turbomeca Shakti-1H turboshaft, 1,068 kW (1,432 shp) each (Mk III and IV)
- Main rotor diameter: 13.2 m (43 ft 4 in)
- Main rotor area: 136.85 m^{2} (1,473.0 sq ft)

Performance

- Cruise speed: 250 km/h (155 mph, 135 kn) for Mk III
- Never exceed speed: 291 km/h (181 mph, 157 kn) for Mk III
- Range: 630 km (390 mi, 340 nmi) for Mk III
- Endurance: 3 hours and 42 minutes for Mk III
- Service ceiling: 6,100 m (20,000 ft)
- g limits: 3.5
- Rate of climb: 10.33 m/s (2,033 ft/min)
- Disk loading: 40.19 kg/m^{2} (8.23 lb/sq ft)

== See also ==
Related development

- Rudra
- Prachand
- HAL LUH
- HAL Medium Lift Helicopter
- Aérospatiale Alouette III (HAL Chetak)
- Aérospatiale SA 315B Lama (HAL Cheetah)

Aircraft of comparable role, configuration, and era

- AgustaWestland AW169
- Bell 412
- Bell 429
- Eurocopter EC145
- Kazan Ansat
- KAI LCH
- KAI LAH
- MD Helicopters MD Explorer
- Sikorsky S-76
- TAI T625 Gökbey

Related lists

- List of rotorcraft
