= HAL Light Utility Helicopter =

Indian light helicopter

Light Utility Helicopter (LUH)
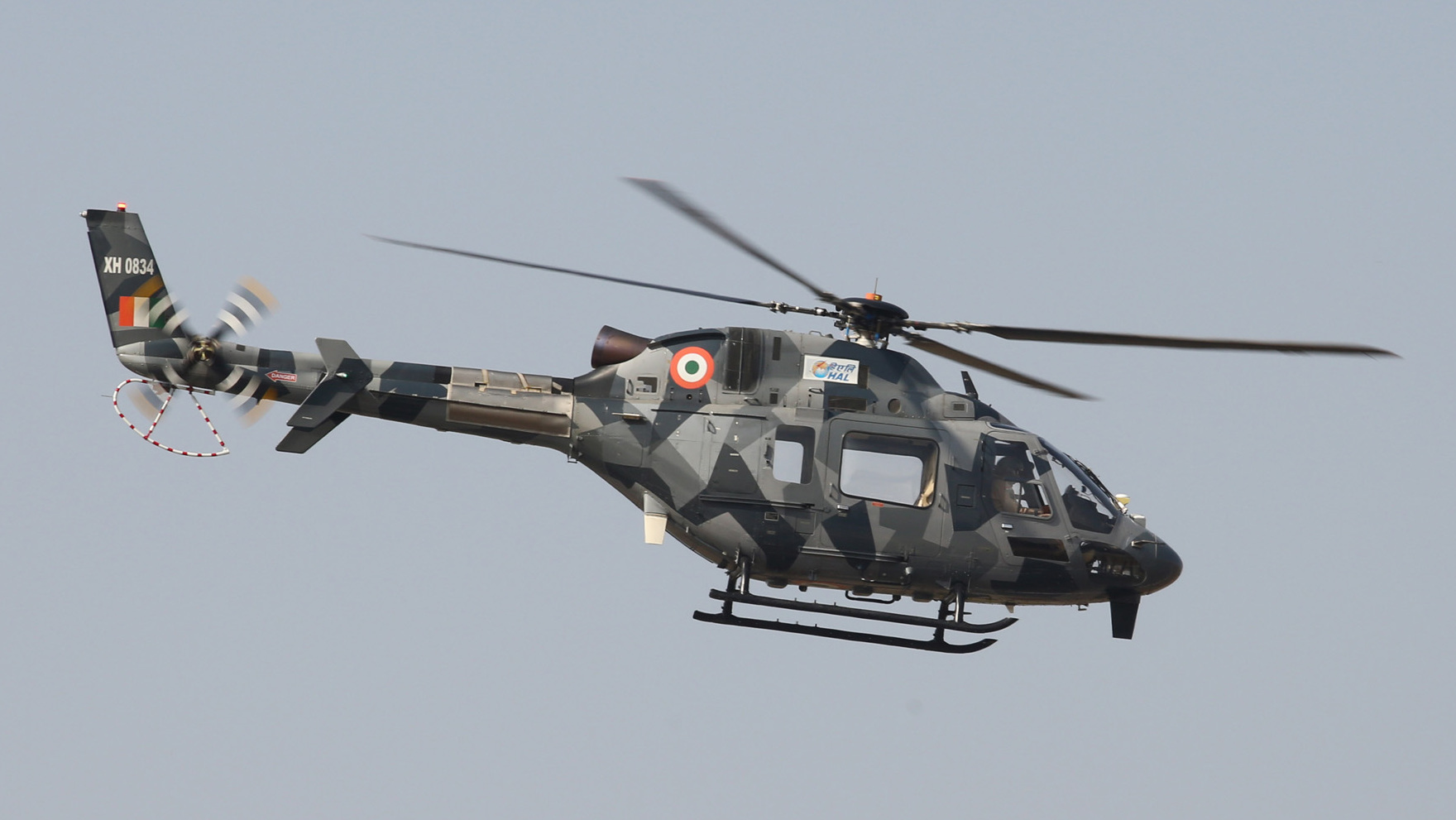
- A HAL LUH at Aero India 2025

General information
- Type: Utility helicopter
- National origin: India
- Manufacturer: Hindustan Aeronautics Limited
- Designer: Rotary Wing Research and Design Center
- Status: Limited series production
- Primary users: Indian Army Indian Air Force
- Number built: 3 (12 on order)

History
- Manufactured: 2013 – present
- Introduction date: 2026 (planned)
- First flight: 6 September 2016

The HAL Light Utility Helicopter (LUH) is an Indian utility helicopter designed and developed by the Rotary Wing Research and Design Center (RWR&DC), one of the research and development (R&D) centres of Hindustan Aeronautics Limited (HAL), for civilian as well as military applications. It is intended to replace license-built versions of Aérospatiale SA 315B Lama (designated Cheetah) and Aérospatiale Alouette III (designated Chetak) in service with the Indian Army (IA) and the Indian Air Force (IAF).

== Development ==
=== Background ===
The first seven-seater French-origin Alouette III helicopters were introduced by the Indian Air Force (IAF) in 1962. During 1965, the Indian aerospace company Hindustan Aeronautics Limited (HAL) supplied the IAF with its first license-produced Alouette III, named HAL Chetak. During 1970, HAL received a contract to license-produce the five-seater SA-315B Lama helicopter, under the name HAL Cheetah, which were first delivered to the IAF in 1976. During the 1990s, the impending need for a successor to the aging Cheetah and Chetak fleets of the Indian Army (IA) and the IAF had been recognized. Multiple competitive tendering processes were made; one such effort sought 197 utility helicopters for the IA, 60 of which were to be directly purchased and the remaining 137 to be license-produced by HAL. However, this tender, in which the Eurocopter Fennec appeared to be the frontrunner against the rival Bell 407, was cancelled amid allegations of irregularities in the selection process; Eurocopter was later exonerated of wrongdoing.

New impartiality safeguards were enacted and the procurement process was restarted. In July 2008, the Government of India issued a request for proposals (RFP) to various companies, including AgustaWestland, Bell Helicopter, Eurocopter, Kamov and Sikorsky, for 197 light utility helicopters – 133 for IA and 64 for IAF – in a fly-away condition directly from the manufacturer for a quick delivery. Intended for military roles, the potential contract was valued as high as $750 million, of which 30 per cent was required to be invested within India under a government industrial offset policy; HAL was also specified to provide domestic maintenance for the fleet. HAL was reportedly keen to both further develop and locally manufacture the selected type. It had been initially hoped for trials to begin in 2009 and deliveries to commence as early as 2010. By late 2008, Bell had announced that it would not participate despite earlier interest in offering the Bell 407; according to Bell, it chose to withdraw from the Indian military market as any bid was less feasible due to the high offset requirements.

By February 2009, the defence ministry was expected to take the decision by early 2010 and induct the first helicopter in 2011. HAL would be responsible for the maintenance of the newly inducted helicopter as well as establish a new division to oversee the LUH programme. However, the trials were further delayed to mid-2010 with the shortlisted bidders to be announced by 2011. Russian Helicopters had entered the competition with its Kamov Ka-226T as reported in June 2011. In February 2012, Eurocopter wrote a letter to the IA amid the delays. The technical evaluation stage had taken 38 months without a formal conclusion due to an undisclosed reason. By November 2012, the competition was reportedly in the final stage between the Fennec and Ka-226T.

In January 2014, the deadline for contract finalisation was extended by six months. The development was after the AgustaWestland bribery scandal and an allegation that an IA Brigadier had demanded $5 million from one of the firms to influence the deal before field trials. The then Army chief, Bikram Singh, in April 2013, had also suggested the defence ministry against proceeding with the deal. On 30 August 2014, the ₹6,000 crore (US$983.13 million) tender was officially redacted by the then defence minister, Arun Jaitley. By 2015, the IA and IAF had a requirement of 259 and 125 light helicopters, respectively. While 197 of the joint requirement of 384 helicopters was being sought from the cancelled global tender, the remaining of 187 was to be sought from domestic suppliers.

On 13 May 2015, the Defence Acquisition Council, the primary procurement arm of the Indian Ministry of Defence and chaired by the Defence Minister, cleared the procurement and in-country production of at least 200 Ka-226Ts for the IA and the IAF. The production would be undertaken at the HAL Helicopter Factory, Tumakuru. On 24 December, an Inter Governmental Agreement (IGA) for the project was signed between India and Russia in Moscow. During October 2016, the Shareholders Agreement to establish of a joint venture to manufacture the Ka-226T in India was signed by the CEO of Russian Helicopters (RH) and the CMD of Hindustan Aeronautics Limited (HAL). In the joint venture, HAL would hold a 50.5% stake while the RH and Rosoboronexport would control the rest of 49.5%. Further, 60 helicopters would be received in fly-away conditions, 40 would be assembled in Indian facilities and the rest of 100 would be produced in India. The Indo Russia Helicopters Limited (IRHL) was incorporated in May 2017. The first batch of 60 would be imported directly from the Ulan-Ude Aviation Plant of RH while the rest would be assembled in India with kits from Ulan-Ude. However, the contract was yet to be signed in November 2021, the Ka-226T purchase had been put on hold due to cost and indigenous content disputes; by August 2022, it was stated that geopolitical factors following the Russo-Ukrainian war from 2022 the deal was expected to be dropped. The Ka-226T deal was cancelled by November 2023.

The replacement of the six-decade old fleet of 186 Chetaks and 200 Cheetahs operated by the IA and IAF is likely to take at least a decade as reported in November 2023. The IA has a requirement of 250 helicopters for reconnaissance and light lift roles, and the service also sent out an RFI to lease 20 reconnaissance and surveillance helicopters (RSH) for five years to close the gap. The RFI responses were being studied in November 2023 when the IA's fleet had 190 helicopters, of which 134 were between 30 and 50 years old, with at least 25 units in MRO at HAL at any given time. During the early 1990s, the fleet had 246 helicopters. Further, the leftover service life, or Total Technical Life (TTL), of the oldest batch of in-service Chetaks ends in 2027. Also, the IAF operates 120 such helicopters, including 18 Cheetals, a modernised variant of Cheetah. The first commissioned batch had already been grounded. The fleet would be replaced through two programmes — HAL Light Utility Helicopter and the Reconnaissance and Surveillance Helicopters (RSH).

The Indian Navy's Chetak replacement programme, namely Naval Utility Helicopter (NUH) project, differs from the IA–IAF LUH project in the additional requirement to operate from warships. Design changes include wheeled landing gear, naval optimization, foldable blades and compact dimensions.

=== Project launch ===
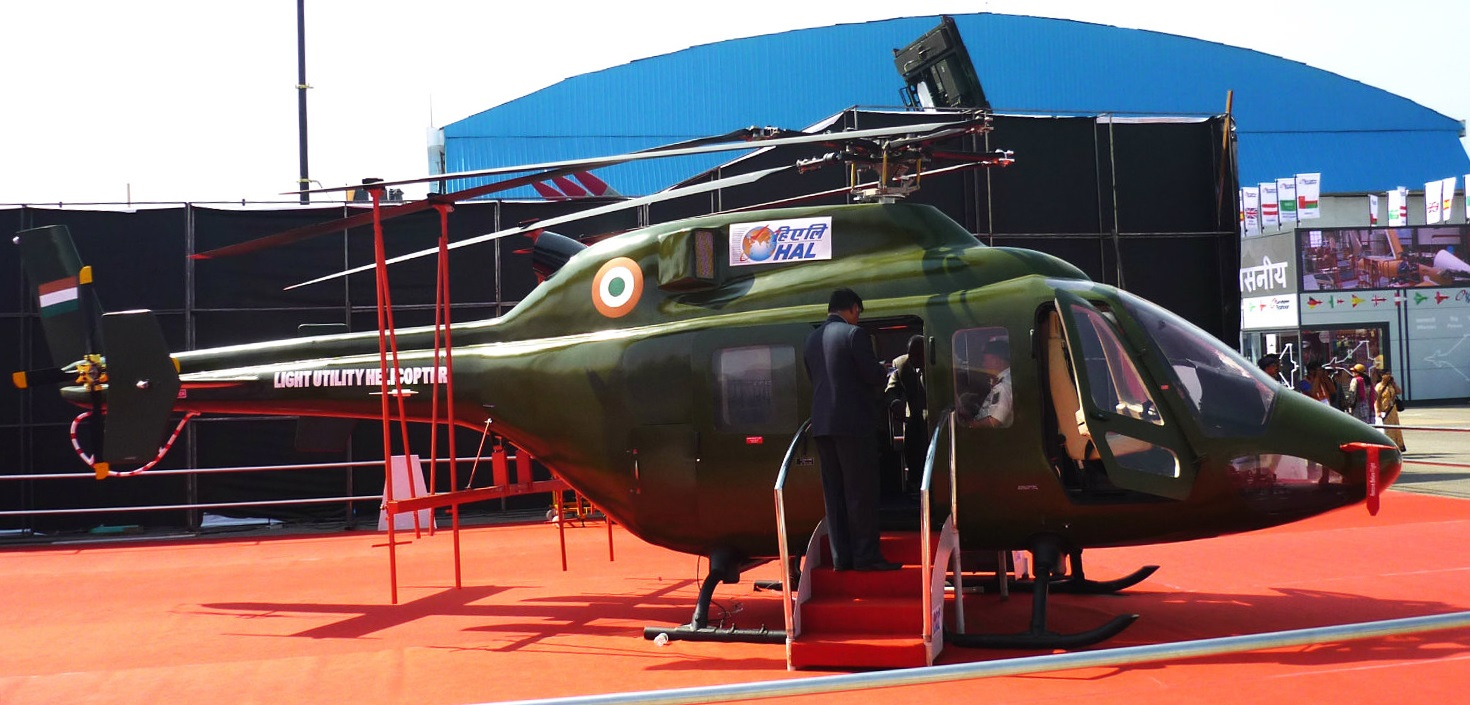
Light Utility Helicopter mock-up at Aero India 2011

HAL had long held ambitions to design and produce an independently developed light helicopter. The firm sought to undertake a programme to supply 187 helicopters to the IA and IAF in June 2008. HAL would begin deliveries in 2015 and is expected to partner with a Western manufacturer with considerable technical know-how in the field; reportedly, Eurocopter were viewed as being the favorite, having already worked with HAL for decades on previous ventures, such as the Chetak and Cheetal that were being replaced. HAL was also in talks with Eurocopter to co-produce 137 AS550s locally in the tender that was cancelled in 2008.

During February 2009, India's defence ministry gave "in-principle" approval to HAL's proposal to manufacture 187 light utility helicopters for the IA and the IAF by 2017. This allowed HAL to enter the design phase of an indigenous programme that could potentially meet the requirements of the armed forces and also explore foreign partnership arrangements. This helicopter was expected to be delivered in five or six years and belong to the 3 tonne category, with a range of up to 500 km (310 mi; 270 nmi) and a payload capacity of up to 500 kg (1,100 lb). The LUH is separate from the Advanced Light Helicopter and Light Combat Helicopter programmes. Of the 187 LUHs, 126 would be inducted into the IA and the remaining 61 are for the IAF. The helicopter could be modified for civilian applications as well.

In March 2010, HAL announced that it had decided to proceed on the project without any foreign consultant. Earlier, the winner of the 197 helicopter tender was expected to be the foreign collaborator for this development programme. However, the trials which were expected to begin in 2009 was delayed to mid-2010 with the shortlisted bidders to be announced by 2011. The helicopter, also referred to as Light Observation Helicopter, would be powered by a single HAL/Turbomeca Shakti turboshaft engine and the maiden flight was scheduled by 2015.

In February 2011, HAL unveiled a full-sized LUH mockup; the LUH's design was officially frozen at this point, although some elements, such as the powerplant, were yet to be selected; additionally, the first prototype was anticipated to be constructed by the end of 2012 and the first flight was set to occur during 2013. By November 2012, the bottom structure assembly of the LUH ground test vehicle had been completed. According to HAL, the modular manufacturing jigs, consisting of five assembly jigs and a coupling jig, had been developed and validated using a Computer Aided Measurement System (CAMS) for high accuracy, stability, and a smooth 'First off' structure build. The powerplant competition was between the HAL/Turbomeca Shakti-1H1 and LHTEC T800. In March 2014, HAL promoted the LUH as a civilian multirole helicopter, noting it could be configured to carry up to six passengers. Meanwhile, the first flight was pushed back to 2017.

By April 2015, the programme had been delayed multiple times. As per a May 2016 report, the project timeline called for four prototypes by 2017 and the start of serial production by 2018.

=== Test programme ===
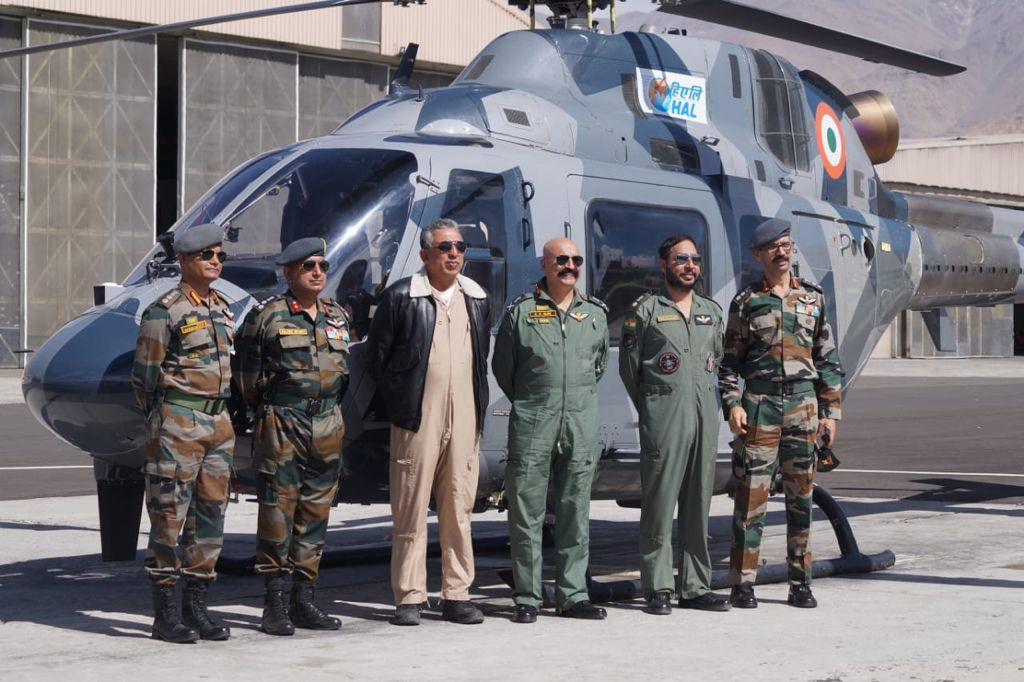
HAL test pilot Wing Commander Unni K. Pillai (retired) and Director General of Army Aviation Corps Lt Gen AK Suri with LUH.

Following repeated delays to the type's first flight, on 6 September 2016, the first prototype LUH PT-1 (ZG4620) conduct its maiden flight from HAL's Bangalore manufacturing facility. The maiden flight, which lasted for 15 minutes and was reportedly flown without any issues, marked the commencement of flight testing. Three prototypes were planned with Initial Operational Clearance (IOC) expected by 2017-end. On 14 February 2017, the first prototype performed a public aerobatic display at Aero India 2017.

On 22 May 2017, the second prototype performed its first flight. The LUH flew at 6 km altitude Envelope Expansion Test at Bengaluru, a critical certification requirement, in December 2018. On 14 December 2018, the third prototype PT-3 had its maiden flight. In 2018, the LUH finished hot weather trials at Nagpur. Testing at sea-level altitudes was completed at Chennai in 2018 and at Puducherry in 2019. In January 2019, the LUH successfully completed cold weather trials. The LUH undertook successful high altitude hot weather trials between 24 August and 2 September 2019.

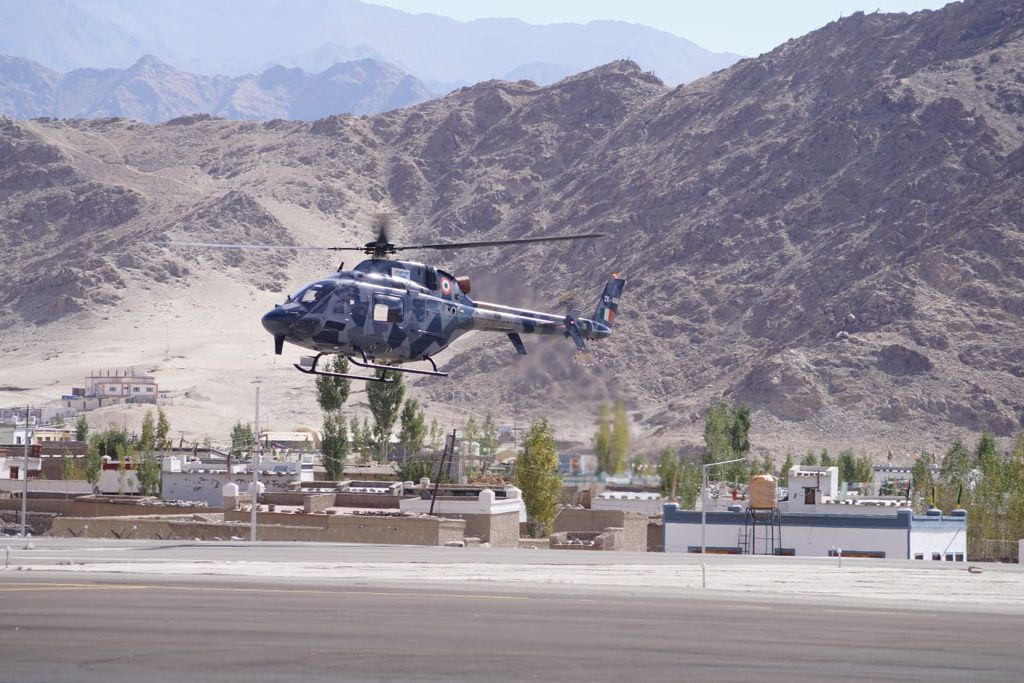
Final test flight of the Army Acceptance Trial on 7 October 2021.

On 7 February 2020, the LUH received its Initial Operational Clearance (IOC) from the Centre for Military Airworthiness and Certification (CEMILAC), Department of Defence Research and Development of the Ministry of Defence (MoD) at the DefExpo 2020. The three prototypes had cumulatively performed over 550 flights by this point. On 9 September 2020, HAL announced the completion of a final demonstration trial, which had been requested by the Army prior to mass production of the LUH; this trial involved envelope expansion, performance, flying qualities, payload and landing capabilities at the highest altitudes of Siachen Glacier. The Final Operational Clearance (FOC) was planned for 2021, following tests focused on its automatic flight control system (AFCS). By 2021, all certification activities, including ground testing, system testing, and flight trials under various conditions, were completed and the design met all of the Armed Forces' Preliminary Joint Services Qualitative Requirements (PJSQR). Certification was followed by the integration of mission equipment.

The IA's LUH variant received the Initial Operational Clearance (IOC) from CEMILAC in the presence of Defence Minister Rajnath Singh at Aero India 2021 on 5 February 2021. On 7 October 2021, Director General of Army Aviation Corps, Lieutenant General AK Suri, flew the LUH's final test sortie, successfully completing the Army Acceptance Trial. The LUH was stated to have reached readiness for induction by the Indian Armed Forces. From August 2022, flight trials started of the limited series production (LSP) platform. In late 2022, the Indian Coast Guard Director General, V S Pathania, led a delegation of officials to HAL, during which he undertook a 45-minute sortie in the LUH. The ICG is evaluating the LUH as a possible replacement for its Chetak fleet.

By November 2023, certain critical systems were still under testing while the Services expected certification and large-scale order within 18 to 20 months. By 19 February 2025, the LUH prototypes logged 1,161 test flights. In early 2025, the Safran-supplied flight control system software was undergoing certification after which the LUH will finally enter production. By October 2025, two concerns expressed by the IAF over the LUH, namely the imported Flight Control System and the main rotor blade, have been reportedly resolved. The Safran FCS will eventually be superseded by an indigenous system while the blade disk has been resolved by HAL, who was hopeful of full certification by December 2025 and delivery of the initial orders by March 2026.

In September 2026, the certification processes of the LUH was expected to be completed by December which would be followed by deliveries. However, service requirements were yet to be met after a few trials. The flight control system required more refinement through more sorties. The helicopter also lacked an autorotation feature. LUH entered the last phases of mission equipment integration in October 2026 to acquire military type certification from CEMILAC. The objective is to improve the autorotation feature and incorporate an automated flight control system to lessen pilot workload and enhance lateral stability among others. On 26 October, LUH underwent autorotation landing demonstration at maximum all-up weight.

=== Manufacturing ===
==== Production facility ====
The primary facility for the helicopter's serial production was established in the Tumakuru district. A plaque for the foundation stone was unveiled by the Prime Minister of India, Narendra Modi, on 3 January 2016. The initial investment amounted to ₹2,000 crore (US$297.64 million) with an annual production capacity of 30 helicopters from 2019–20. The rate would be later enhanced to 60 units in a four-year long phase II development. The limited series production (LSP), however, would be conducted at HAL's Bengaluru facility. The 615 acres (2.49 km^{2}) factory, reportedly the largest in India, was inaugirated on 6 February 2023 by Narendra Modi. Another third phase expansion was planned to deliver 90 helicopters annually.

==== Limited series production ====
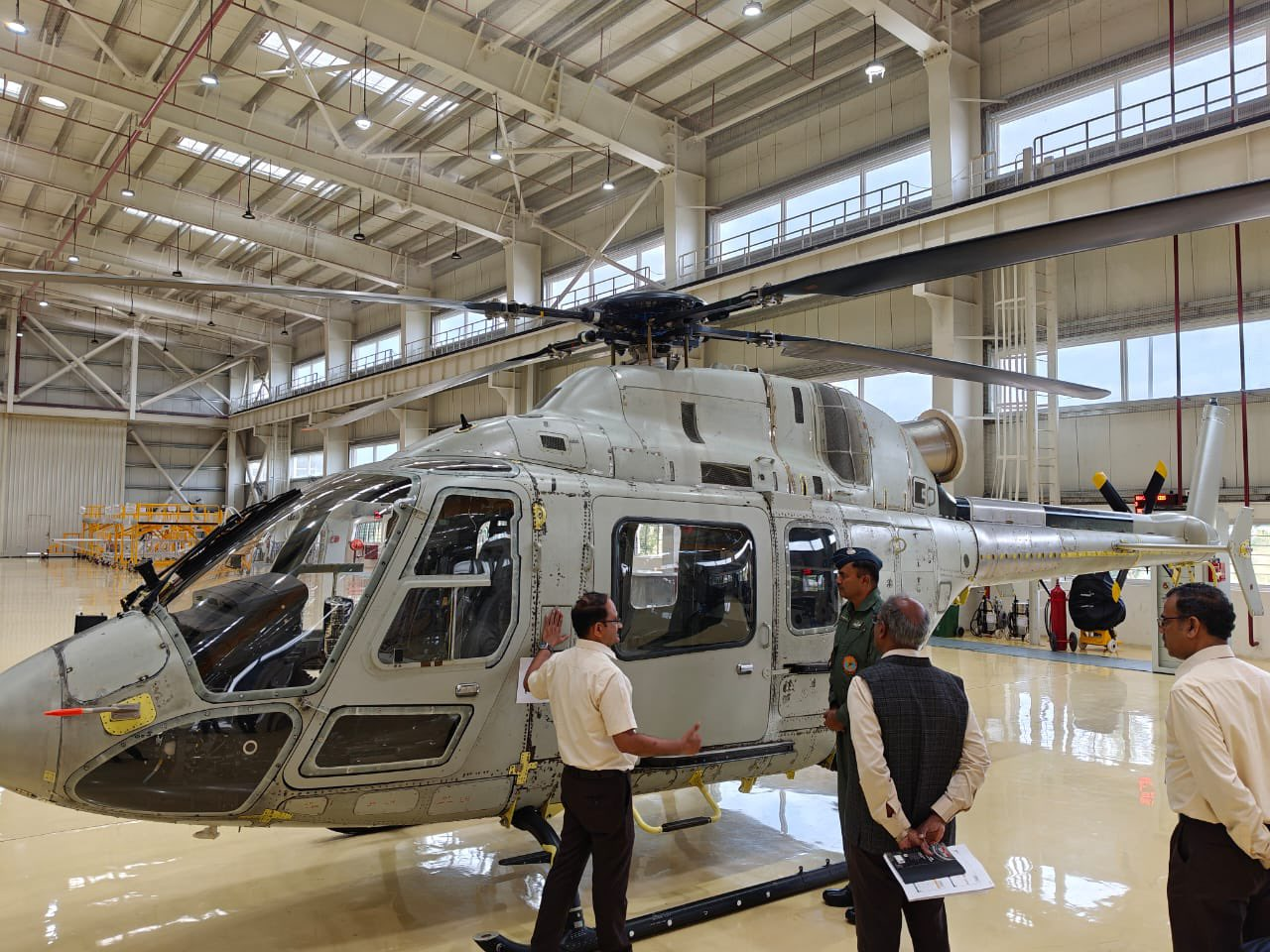
An LUH LSP at HAL's production line on 9 September 2024.

The Defence Acquisition Council (DAC) on 2 November 2021 approved the purchase of 12 limited series production (LSP) LUHs, at a cost of ₹1,500 crore (US$202.93 million), six each for the IA and IAF. The Indian Armed Forces will purchase 175 production variant helicopters. As per a government report from the Rajya Sabha on 29 November, both the IA and IAF would receive two LSP each from 2022–23. By August 2022, HAL had received a Letter of Intent (LoI) from the Services to manufacture 12 LUHs, two of which were already in advanced stages of production. Additionally, a Request for Quotation had also been issued to HAL for a large order. Against the original commitment of 126 units, the IA is expected to purchase 111 LUHs.

The LSP contract was yet to be signed in November 2023, though the deliveries were expected to commence in August 2022. A large scale order would only be placed once the LSP variants are commissioned. The issue included the lack of a certified autopilot system, or Automatic Flight Control System (AFCS), in the helicopter which is mandated by the Services for the LSP variant. However, HAL has commenced trials after the issue was resolved. The first six LSP variants would then be delivered between December 2024 and June 2025.

The delays were attributed to supply of flight control system or auto pilot software purchased from Safran Electronics which had already been installed at least one helicopter. HAL has produced six LUHs and had sought help from the Netherlands to overcome a particular adjustment. The first LUH will be delivered within 24 months of signing the contract.

==== Indian Army order ====
By November 2023, the IA was planning to place an initial order worth ₹45,000 crore (equivalent to ₹490 billion or US$5.1 billion in 2026) for over 90 helicopters and has a total requirement of around 250 helicopters. Around this time, a combined order for the three branches of India's Armed Forces is expected to be finalized within the next 18-20 months, with deliveries projected to commence from 2026 onward. The larger contract was expected by January 2024. In September 2024, The Hindu reported that the IA has a requirement of 225 light helicopters and a deal of 110 LUHs was in the cost negotiation stage.

== Design ==
The HAL Light Utility Helicopter (LUH) is an agile three-tonne light helicopter. It possesses a cruise speed of 235 km/h (146 mph), maximum speed of 260 km/h (160 mph), service ceiling of up to 6.5 km (21,000 ft), a range of 350 km (220 mi) with maximum take-off weight of 3.12 tonne and an empty weight of 1.91 tonne. The LUH will be capable of accommodating a maximum of two pilots and six passengers, all of which shall be seated on crash-worthy seats; externally, it is capable of carrying cargoes of up to one tonne under-slung. It will be able to undertake various roles, including emergency medical services (EMS), troop transport, utility, search and rescue (S&R), VVIP, aerial reconnaissance and surveillance missions.

The LUH is powered by a single 750 KW rated Shakti-1U turboshaft engine derived from Safran Ardiden, co-developed by HAL and Turbomeca. This engine supports dual channel Full Authority Digital Engine Control (FADEC) system along with backup fuel control system. The gearbox was developed by Microtec company located in Hyderabad, while the ring gear is built by Shanti Gears and transmission by HAL. An alternative engine, the HTSE-1200, which features a greater degree of indigenous content, is under development with the aim of replacing the Shakti-1U engines.

The helicopter will be equipped with a glass cockpit featuring a Smart Cockpit Display System (SCDS) along with a skid-based landing gear arrangement. LUH is the only helicopter in the 3 ton category to have foldable rotors. The LUH is equipped with a state-of-the-art HUMS (Health & Usage Monitoring System). Avionics hardware is supplied by Chennai-based Data patterns and HAL worked on the software. With supplies from many other Indian companies, HAL plans to take the indigenous content to over 60 percent. The LUH is intended to be compatible with Generation 3 (GEN III) night vision goggles technology developed by the Netro Optronics division of MKU. The LUH also features a flight control system or autopilot software from Safran Electronics. The software, which has two parts including for basic stabilization, is presently undergoing final certification.

== Operators ==
=== Military operators ===
India

- Indian Air Force: 6 LSP approved for order, 61 planned.
- Indian Army: 6 LSP approved for order, 110 production variants in negotiation stage. Original commitment was 126.
- Indian Coast Guard : Planned to replace Chetak fleet.

=== Civil operators ===
- Vman Aviation : 5 planned.

=== Potential operators ===
Argentina

- Argentina's Ministry of Defense has signed a Letter of Intent (LoI) to procure HAL Dhruv and HAL LUH for Armed Forces of the Argentine Republic.

== Specifications ==
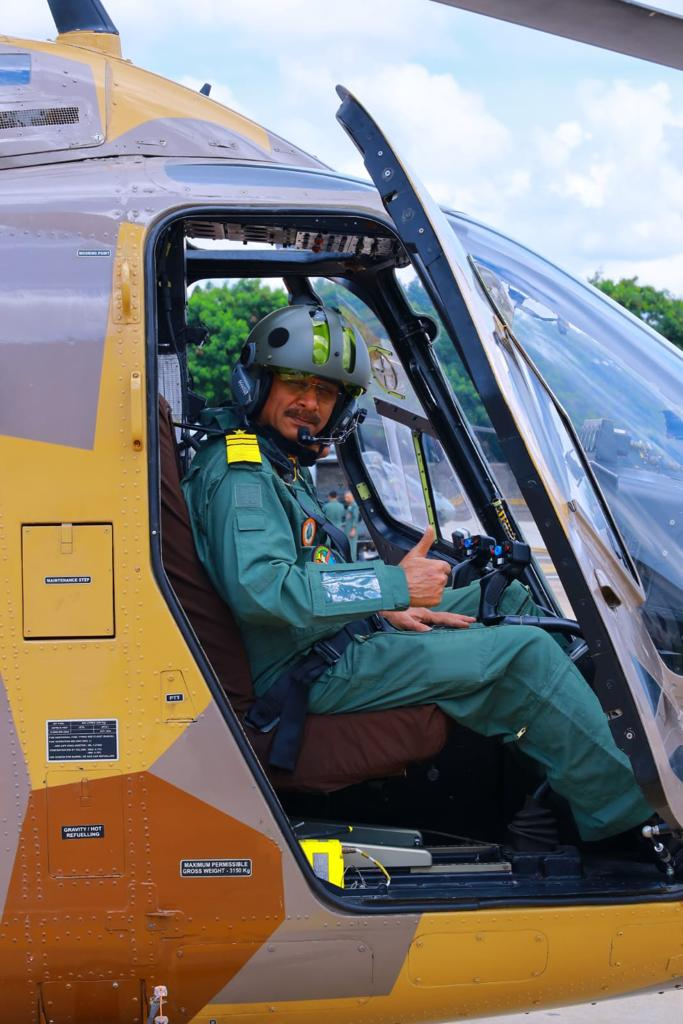
DG, Indian Coast Guard, V S Pathania, undertook his maiden sortie (45 minutes) in the LUH at HAL facility in Bengaluru.

Data from Jane's All the World's Aircraft, HAL

General characteristics

- Crew: 2
- Capacity: 6 passengers
- Length: 11.49 m (37 ft 8.25 in)
- Height: 3.38 m (11 ft 1 in) up to the top of the tailfin
- Empty weight: 1,910 kg (4,211 lb)
- Max takeoff weight: 3,150 kg (6,945 lb)
- Powerplant: 1 × HAL/Turbomeca Shakti-1U turboshaft engine, 1,058 kW (1,419 hp) Maximum power output & 912 kilowatts (1,223 shp) continuous power output.
- Main rotor diameter: 11.6 m (38 ft 0.75 in)

Performance

- Maximum speed: 235 km/h (146 mph, 127 kn) at Sea-level
- Never exceed speed: 259 km/h (161 mph, 140 kn)
- Range: 350 km (217 mi, 189 nmi) with a 500 Kg Payload
- Ferry range: 500 km (310 mi, 270 nmi) on Internal Fuel
- Service ceiling: 6,500 m (21,300 ft)
- Rate of climb: 6.66 m/s (1,426 ft/min)

== See also ==
Related development

- HAL Dhruv
- Indian Multi Role Helicopter

Aircraft of comparable role, configuration, and era

- Bell 429
- Eurocopter UH-72 Lakota
- Kazan Ansat

Related lists

- List of rotorcraft
