= MKU =

MKU is a three-letter initialism which may refer to:

- Mustafa Kemal University, in Hatay Province, Turkey
- Island Air (Hawaii)'s ICAO airline code.
- Madurai Kamaraj University in India.
- Mt Kenya University
- MKU (company) an Indian manufacturing company
- MK:U, a planned undergraduate campus of Cranfield University to be built in Milton Keynes, England
