= Safran Ardiden =

Turboshaft engine

Ardiden
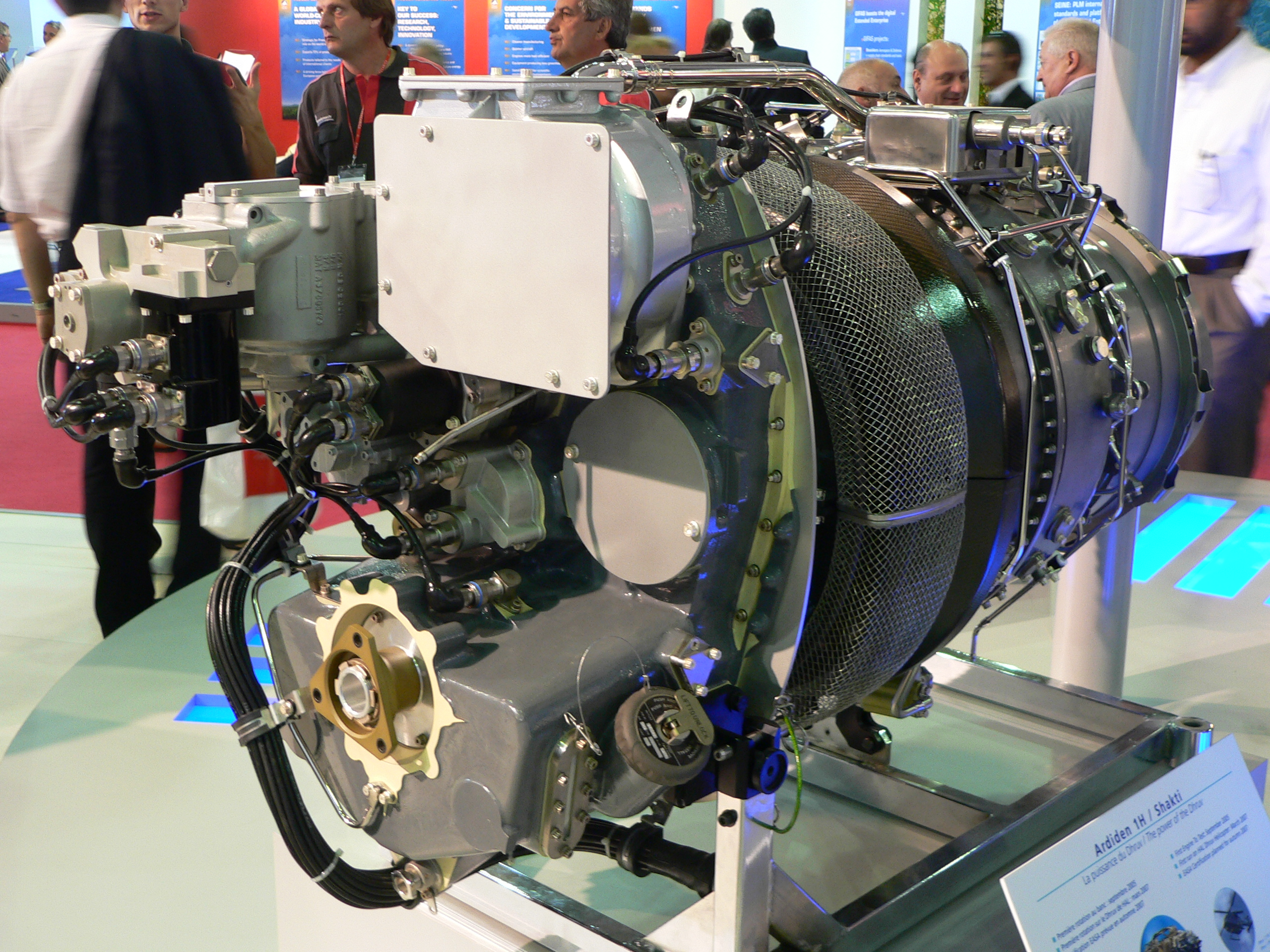
- Type: Turboshaft
- National origin: France
- Manufacturer: Safran Helicopter Engines
- Built by: Safran Helicopter Engines; Hindustan Aeronautics Limited; Aero Engine Corporation of China
- First run: 2005
- Major applications: HAL Dhruv
- Number built: 250 by 2018
- Developed from: Turbomeca TM 333
- Variants: Ardiden-1; Ardiden-3: WZ16; Ardiden-3TP

The Safran Ardiden is a 1,400–2,000 hp (1,000–1,500 kW) turboshaft designed and produced by Safran Helicopter Engines for 5–8 t (11,000–18,000 lb) single and twin-engine helicopters. Launched in 2003 as a more powerful TM 333, it first ran in 2005 and was introduced in 2007.

The Ardiden 1 Shakti powers the Indian HAL Dhruv, HAL Prachand and HAL Light Utility Helicopter while the more powerful Ardiden 3 powers the Avicopter AC352 and Kamov Ka-62.

== Development ==
In 1961, Turbomeca granted Hindustan Aeronautics Limited a manufacturing license for the Artouste turboshaft engine to equip the Indian HAL Chetak (Alouette III) and HAL Cheetah (SA 315B Lama) helicopters.

By September 2000, HAL had contracted with Turbomeca to develop a more powerful version of the ALH's TM 3332B2, from 747 to 800 kW (1,002 to 1,073 hp). By January 2002, Turbomeca had begun developing the 1,200 hp (890 kW) Ardiden TM3332C2 for 5–6 t (11,000–13,000 lb) helicopters, launched at the Paris Air Show for the LAH as the Shakti, co-developed and assembled by HAL, as the US lifted India's 1998 nuclear tests sanctions. The TM3332B2 first two axial stages were replaced by a centrifugal compressor, and the power turbine went from one to two stages, while the two channel FADEC came from the TM3332E. Then expected to enter service in 2005, its estimated market was 1,500 engines over the first 15 years.

By July 2002, Turbomeca was ready to launch the 900 kW (1,200 hp) engine development with HAL for 11% for the ALH, then renamed Dhruv. The TM333 was derated from 800 to 765 kW (1,073 to 1,026 hp) for the Dhruv, and the Ardiden 1H Shakti would be derated from 1,070 to 900 kW (1,430 to 1,210 hp). The Ardiden 1A was designed to for the Eurocopter EC155HP+, and the Ardiden 2K for the Agusta-Bell AB.139. It would slot between the 485–740 kW (650–992 hp) Arriel and the 1,240–1,565 kW (1,663–2,099 hp) Makila for 5-6 t (11,000-13,250lb) medium twins. At $500,000, it would be 40% cheaper than 900kW competitors like the Honeywell/Rolls-Royce LHTEC CTS800 and the MTU/Turbomeca/R-R MTR390. The first test run was then expected in early 2004, flight-testing by the end of the same year, certification by the end of 2005 and entry into service by 2006. It was launched in February 2003 at the Aero India show with a large order from HAL, to be used in 6-6.5 t (13,200-14,300lb) helicopters. HAL was to supply one-tenth of its components.

By October 2005, Turbomeca ran the first example in Tarbes, planning a July 2006 first flight. HAL has an 11% stake in development and 21% of the manufacture: the gearbox, power turbine and part of the HP compressor. The design include the single-crystal HP turbine blades and new ceramic coatings to run without cooling, for 20% of growth potential.

Developed by India for 19%, the Shakti made its first test flight on the Dhruv on 16 August 2007. By late 2007, HAL started fitting the Shakti for Dhruvs produced from then.

The Ardiden 3G was certified in June 2017 and by 2018, 250 Ardiden 1 were in service. By September 2019, the Ardiden 1 engines had completed 200,000 flying hours, and the Ardiden 3C/3G had completed over 10,000 hours of tests.

On 6 October 2026, it was announced that HAL is establishing a second production line for the Shakti engine at its Koraput division in Sunabeda when the facility rolled out its 2,000th engine in six decades. The new production line at a cost of ₹218 crore (€20 million) and a capacity of 100 engines per year would be completed by 2028–29.

=== Turboprop version ===
By April 2019, Safran was considering a turboprop version of the Ardiden to compete with the Pratt & Whitney Canada PT6 and General Electric Catalyst, based on its Tech-TP demonstrator, part of the EU's Clean Sky 2 programme, for first ground runs in the coming months. The first ground run happened on 12 June in Tarnos; the complete propulsion system include the nacelle, air intake and propeller while the accessory gearbox and propeller controller include more electric technologies.

It could be used for a future European UAV, in cooperation with ZF Luftfahrttechnik for the gearbox and MT-Propeller for the propeller. The FADEC would manage both power and propeller pitch for operation up to 13,716 meters / 45,000 ft. The Tech TP compact, lightweight architecture targets a 15% lower fuel consumption over current engines. On 21 July 2020, a memorandum of agreement was signed between Safran and ZF, targeting flight testing of the 1,700-2,000shp (1,260-1,490kW) Ardiden 3TP from 2022. The 11 t EuroMALE UAV, set for a 2024 first flight, is a goal as a first platform, before civil applications.

== Design ==
The Ardiden 1 offers 1,400 to 1,700 hp (1,000 to 1,300 kW) and the Ardiden 3 covers the 1,700–2,000 hp (1,300–1,500 kW) range, for 5 to 8 t (11,000 to 18,000 lb) single and twin-engine helicopters.

The Ardiden has a two-stage centrifugal compressor, then a reverse flow annular combustor, a single stage axial gas generator turbine followed by a two-stage axial free turbine outputting its power to the front by a concentric shaft, and is controlled by a dual-channel digital engine electronic control unit.

== Variants and applications ==
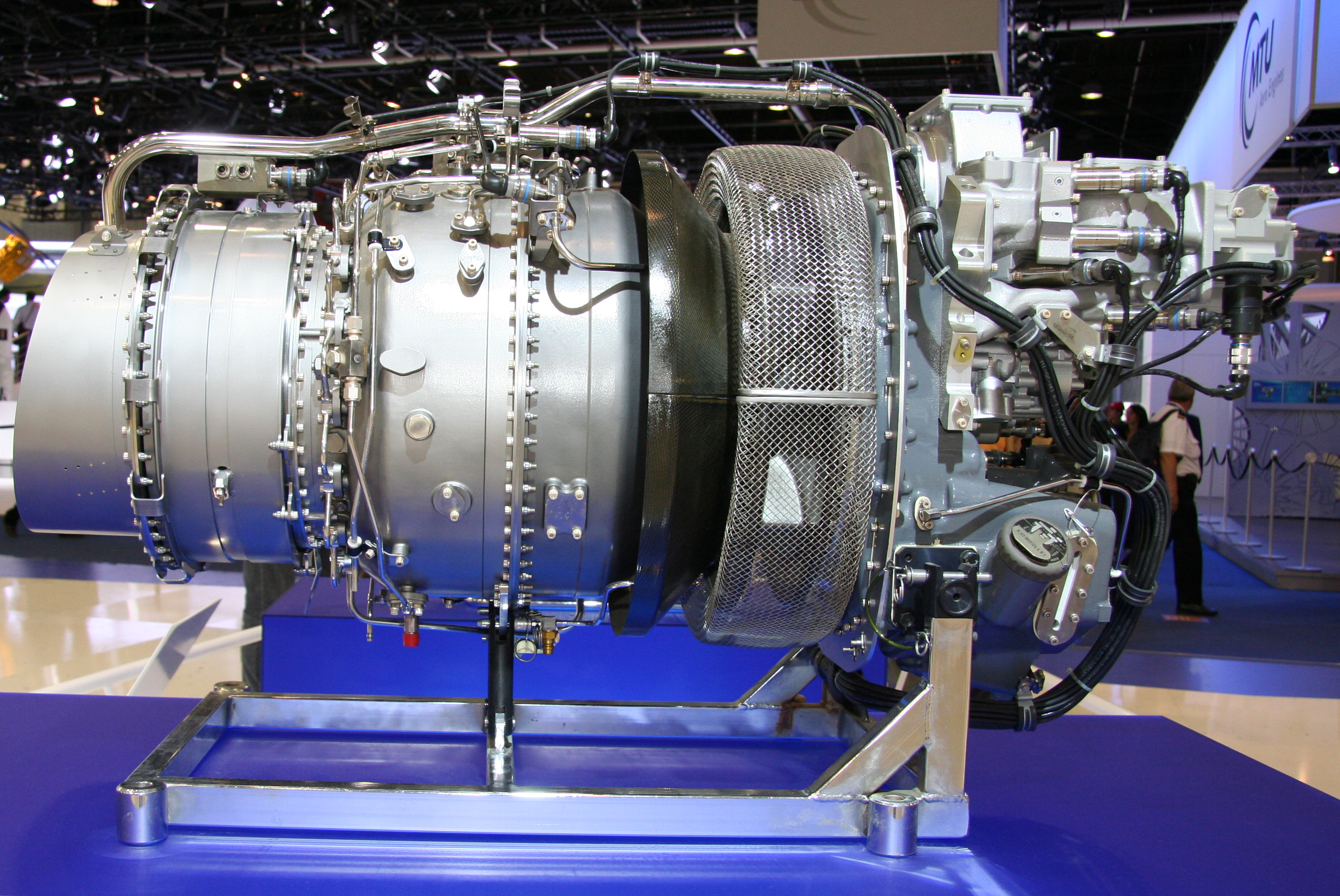
Ardiden 1H1 for the HAL Dhruv and HAL Prachand

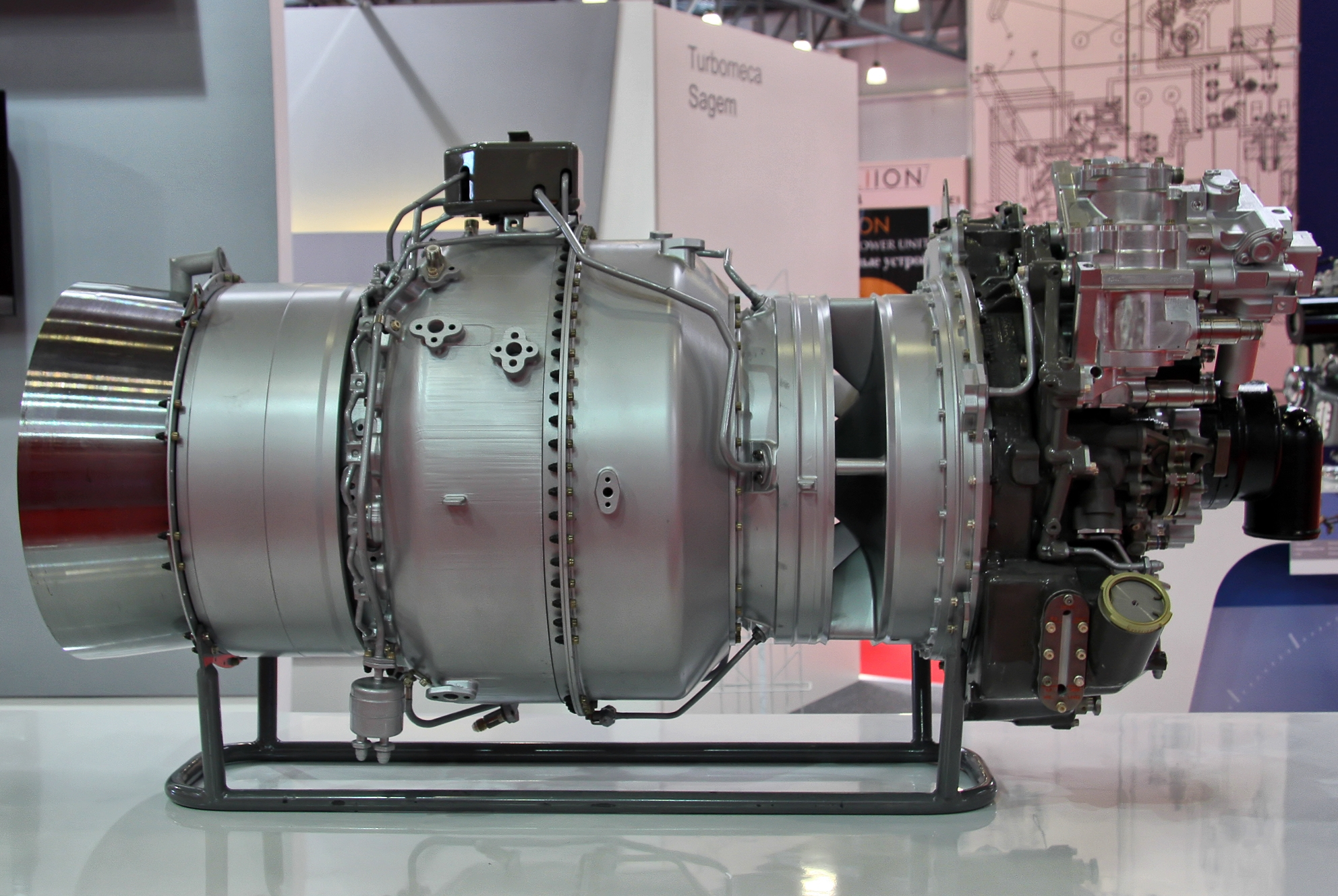
Ardiden 3G for the Ka-62

Variant	Certification	Application
Ardiden 1H	20 December 2007	HAL Dhruv; HAL Prachand
Ardiden 1H1	11 March 2009	HAL Dhruv; HAL Prachand
Ardiden 1U	31 October 2019	HAL Light Utility Helicopter
Ardiden 3G	12 June 2017	Kamov Ka-62
Ardiden 3C / WZ16	5 April 2018	Avicopter AC352

== Specifications ==
Variant	Ardiden 1	Ardiden 3
length	1,250 mm (49 in)	1,244–1,285.4 mm (48.98–50.61 in)
height × width	694×519 mm (27.3×20.4 in)	648×640–655.9 mm (25.51×25.20–25.82 in)
weight	205 kg (452 lb)	215–226.6 kg (474–500 lb)
compressor	2 centrifugal stages	
combustor	reverse flow	
turbine	1 HP stage, 2 power stages	
T/O power	938–1,032 kW (1,258–1,384 hp)	968–1,177 kW (1,298–1,578 hp)
power/weight	4.58–5.03 kW/kg (2.79–3.06 hp/lb)	4.27–5.47 kW/kg (2.60–3.33 hp/lb)

== See also ==
Related development

- Turbomeca TM 333

Comparable engines

- HAL HTSE-1200
- LHTEC CTS800
- MTR390
- Pratt & Whitney Canada PT6
- Safran Arrano

Related lists

- List of aircraft engines
