= Army Aviation Corps (India) =

Aviation arm of the Indian Army and its youngest overall combat arm

- Army Aviation badge
- Founded: 1 November 1986
- Country: India
- Type: Army aviation
- Role: Anti-tank warfare; Battlefield support; Counterinsurgency operations; Counter Surface Force Operation; High Altitude Warfare; Humanitarian aid and disaster response; Reconnaissance; Search and rescue; Suppression of Enemy Air Defenses; Urban warfare
- Size: 296 manned aircraft (Excluding UAVs)
- Part of: Indian Army
- Mottos: Sanskrit: सुवेग व सुदृढ़ English: Swift and Sure
- Engagements: Indo-Pakistani War of 1965; Indo-Pakistani War of 1971; Siachen conflict Operation Pawan; UNOSOM II; Kargil War; Operation Hot Pursuit
- Decorations: Maha Vir Chakra (2); Uttam Yudh Seva Medal; Vir Chakra (16); Ati Vishisht Seva Medals (3); Shaurya Chakra (11); Yudh Seva Medals (5); Sena Medals (54); Sena Medal bar; Vayu Sena Medals (8); Vishisht Seva Medals (19); Mentions in dispatches (45); Chief of Army/Air Staff commendation cards (154)
- Website: Indian Army Official Site

Commanders
- Director general: Lieutenant General Vinod Nambiar

Aircraft flown
- Attack: HAL Rudra, HAL Prachand, Boeing AH-64 Apache
- Transport: HAL Dhruv, HAL Chetak, HAL Cheetah

The Army Aviation Corps (AAC) is the youngest arm of the Indian Army, being formally designated on 1 November 1986. The Army Aviation Corps units are designated as Squadrons. Each squadron generally consists of two Flights. Reconnaissance (Recce) and Observation (R & O) flights might be part of squadrons or operate independently. The latter do not have a parent squadron and are designated by an (I) in their name.

== History ==
=== Early years ===
The earliest use of aircraft by the army can be traced to the air observation posts (Air OP), where aeroplanes were used during the World War I to help artillery spotters (Forward Observation Officers) to locate and direct artillery fire to targets on the ground. This role was improved upon and further refined in the World War II. The Army Aviation wing of the Royal Air Force was established in India in 1942. No. 656 Air OP Squadron (RAF), the first Air OP unit reached the Indian subcontinent in 1943 to assist the operations in the Burma campaign. Following the war, 659 Squadron of the Royal Air Force, which had played an important role as an air observation post unit and worked closely with Army units in artillery spotting and liaison was despatched to India. On 14 August 1947, No.659 (Air OP) Squadron was disbanded and partitioned between India and Pakistan. No.1 (Independent) Air OP Flight of the Royal Indian Air Force was formed the next day. The aircraft (Auster Mark IVs) and ground equipment were retrieved by Captains HS Butalia, Govind Singh and Man Singh from Lahore and moved to Amritsar, and finally to Jalandhar. The second unit, No.2 Air OP Flight was raised in October 1947 with five Auster Mark Vs. During these early years, officers were trained at School of Artillery, Deolali, and also at the Royal Air Force Central Flying School at Little Rissington in the United Kingdom.

=== Early operations ===
Indo-Pakistani War of 1947–1948

The Austers of No.1 (I) Air OP Flight deployed in Jammu and Kashmir were employed in reconnaissance, direction of artillery fire and casualty evacuation from exposed advanced landing grounds, which it performed gallantly. During the fourteen months of operations, the Austers flew from Jammu and Srinagar airfields and the advance landing grounds (ALGs) at Naoshera, Jhangar, Rajouri, Mendhar and Chhamb.

Annexation of Hyderabad

No. 2 Air OP Flight took part in Operation Polo and was attached with the 1st Armoured Division in September 1948. Following the operations, they moved to Begumpet Airport.

Annexation of Goa

No.3 Air OP Flight, which was raised in 1958 with the new Auster Mark IX aircraft took part in the capture of Goa during Operation Vijay in 1961.

=== The idea of a corps for Army Aviation ===
In 1963, the then Army Chief General Jayanto Nath Chaudhuri took up the case for raising of a separate air wing for the army, which would increase the firepower and mobility of the army and would comprise light, medium and heavy as well as armed helicopters.

Indo-Pakistani War of 1965

No.1 (I) Air OP Flight saw action against regular armoured forces, supported by artillery and mechanised infantry during the Rann of Kutch operations in April 1965. The Austers of the unit acted in support of the 50 (Independent) Parachute Brigade and proved useful during the heavy artillery duels. The most noteworthy event was the use of Austers to direct fire of 71 Medium Regiment leading to the direct hits on an ammunition dump at Biar Bet in the Rann. Following the ceasefire, the Army understood the need for more adequate Air OP cover and the limitations of the ageing Austers. This problem was well understood by Brigadier FSB Mehta, the then Brigadier (Artillery) in the Western Command, who incidentally was the first Indian Artillery officer to wear the wings of the Air OP in 1944. He got on loan Pushpak light training aircraft from Flying Clubs to raise Nos. 6, 7 and 8 Flights, which were made available to the frontline Army Divisions on the Western Front. Though lacking in aircraft, both in numbers and quality, the Air OP pilots performed a commendable job during the war.

Inter-service issues

Following the war, the Pushpaks were given back to the Flying Clubs. They were replaced with HAL HAOP-27 Krishaks, which was a larger version of the Pushpak and was primarily designed as an agricultural aircraft. The aircraft continued to be operated by the Army, but training and maintenance of aircraft were the responsibility of the Indian Air Force. Since the air force would only accept ten Army pilots per year, training of adequate numbers of pilots for the Air OP was a problem. Hence, No. 660 Air OP Squadron which was located at Patiala with five flights under its command, was given this additional responsibility of training.

The late 1960s saw an intense debate between the army and the air force. The army wanted to equip each division with at least one Air OP flight, which was not agreeable to the air force. The army also wanted the fixed wing aircraft to be replaced with the more manoeuvrable helicopters. This was finally agreed upon and the army pilots underwent training and conversion in 1968. The plans were to introduce HAL Chetaks (Aérospatiale Alouette III) for operations in the plains and the HAL Cheetah (Aérospatiale SA 315B Lama) for the mountains. Both these helicopters were manufactured by Hindustan Aeronautics Limited under license from Aérospatiale of France. The introduction of helicopters in the army led to its use in diverse roles in addition to Air OP – transport, casualty evacuation, communications, liaison, light utility and light attack roles.

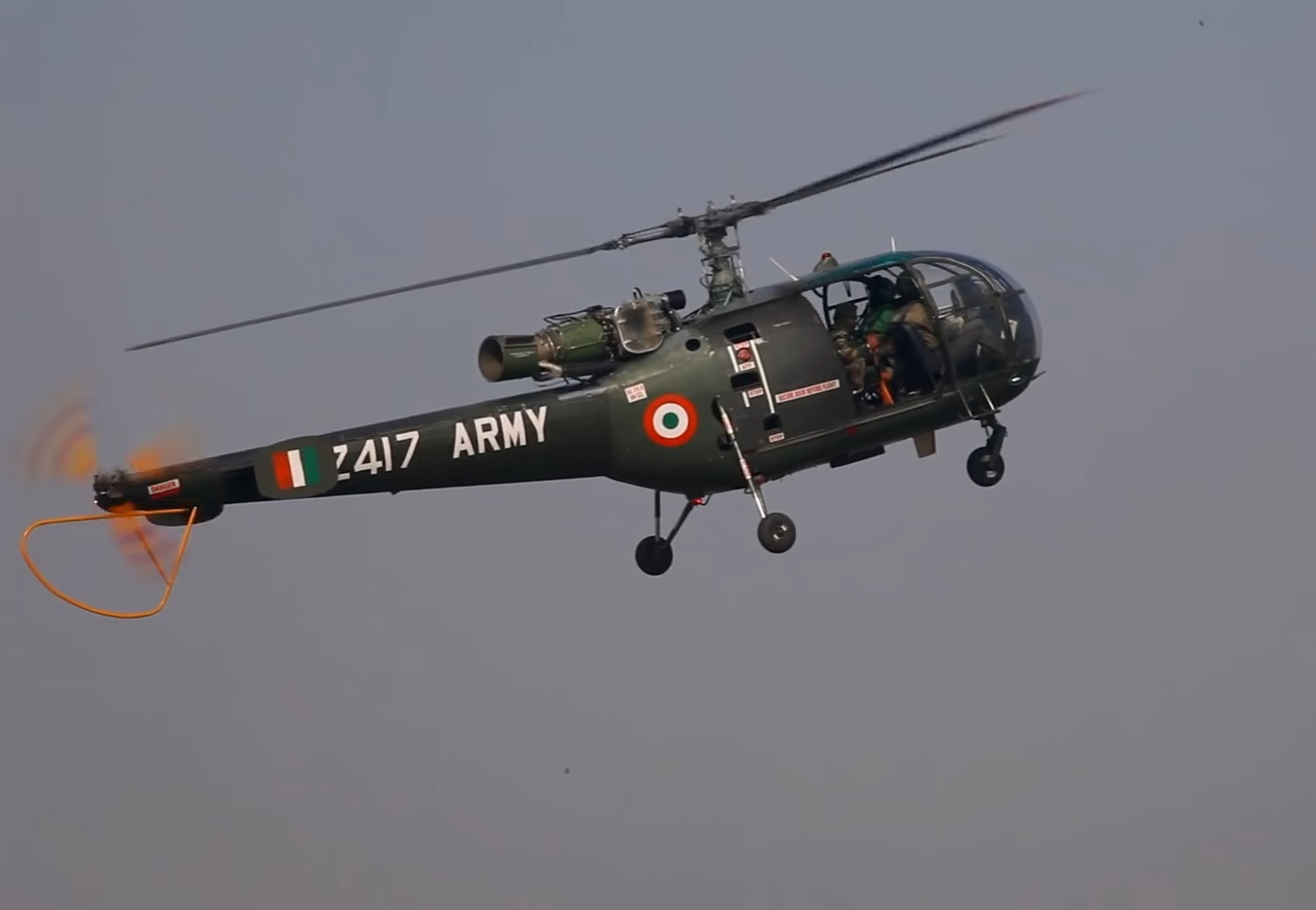
HAL Chetak helicopter

Indo-Pakistani War of 1971

A better equipped Air OP under the Eastern Command took part in Operation Cactus Lily. In addition to its traditional role of directing artillery fire, it flew communication sorties along with photo and reconnaissance missions. No. 11 AOP Flight dropped numerous surrender leaflets and then was instrumental in guiding the Mil Mi-4 transport helicopters during the daring crossing of the Meghna River by 4 Corps. Major Menezes landed an Army HAL Krishak at Tejgaon Airport at Dhaka, the first Indian fixed wing aircraft to do so.

Meanwhile, in the western sector, the Air OP units took part in the following sectors-

- Chhamb Sector - No.2 Air OP Flight, in support of the 10th, 25th and 26th Infantry Divisions
- Shakargarh Sector - Nos.1 and 9 Air OP Flights, in support of the 39th and 54th Infantry Divisions
- Punjab sector – No. 661 Air OP Squadron with Nos. 3, 8 and 14 AOP Flights, in support of 7th, 14th and 15th Infantry Divisions
- Jaisalmer Sector – No. 12 (Independent) Air OP Flight, in support of 12th Infantry Division

=== Evolution as a corps ===
Following the 1971 war, the Air OP retired all their fixed wing aircraft and moved on completely to helicopters. New squadrons and flights were raised. With an increasing number of pilots needing to be trained, and the Air Force finding that difficult, 659 Air OP Squadron took up the responsibility of training at that time. These helicopter pilots proved their mettle in the frigid high altitudes of Siachen Glacier, the world's highest battlefield, where they supported the troops, flying in supplies, flying out the injured and directing artillery fire; braving both the weather and enemy fire.

The proposals were first put forward to the Government in April 1968 for an independent Corps of Army Aviation, which would be part of an integrated command and control along with tanks, guns and infantry. These were renewed in February 1977. The Air Force raised concerns about duplication of aircraft, ground facilities and manpower. The efforts were renewed in 1981, when a Study Group continued to press for a formal decision. The Chief of Army Staff, General Krishnaswamy Sundarji made a compelling presentation to the then Prime Minister Rajiv Gandhi in November 1985. This finally bore fruit and an Army Aviation Cell was created at Army headquarters under then Brigadier Atma Singh. On 16 July 1986, the Government decided that the Army would have its own communication and utility helicopters, which would wholly man, maintain and control it. All the Air OP Squadrons and Flights would be transferred to the Army, but all attack helicopter units and medium and heavy-lift helicopters would remain with the Air Force. The attack helicopters would be placed under command and control of the Army. An Additional Directorate General of Army Aviation was sanctioned on 29 October 1986 and placed under the Director General Mechanised Forces. The Corps of Army Aviation thus came into being on 1 November 1986, with Brigadier (later Major General) Atma Singh as the first Additional Director General. The Chetak and Cheetah helicopters were transferred to the Army, but the Air Force continued to provide logistic and maintenance support till 31 October 1989. The nomenclature Air OP was changed to Reconnaissance and Observation (R&O).

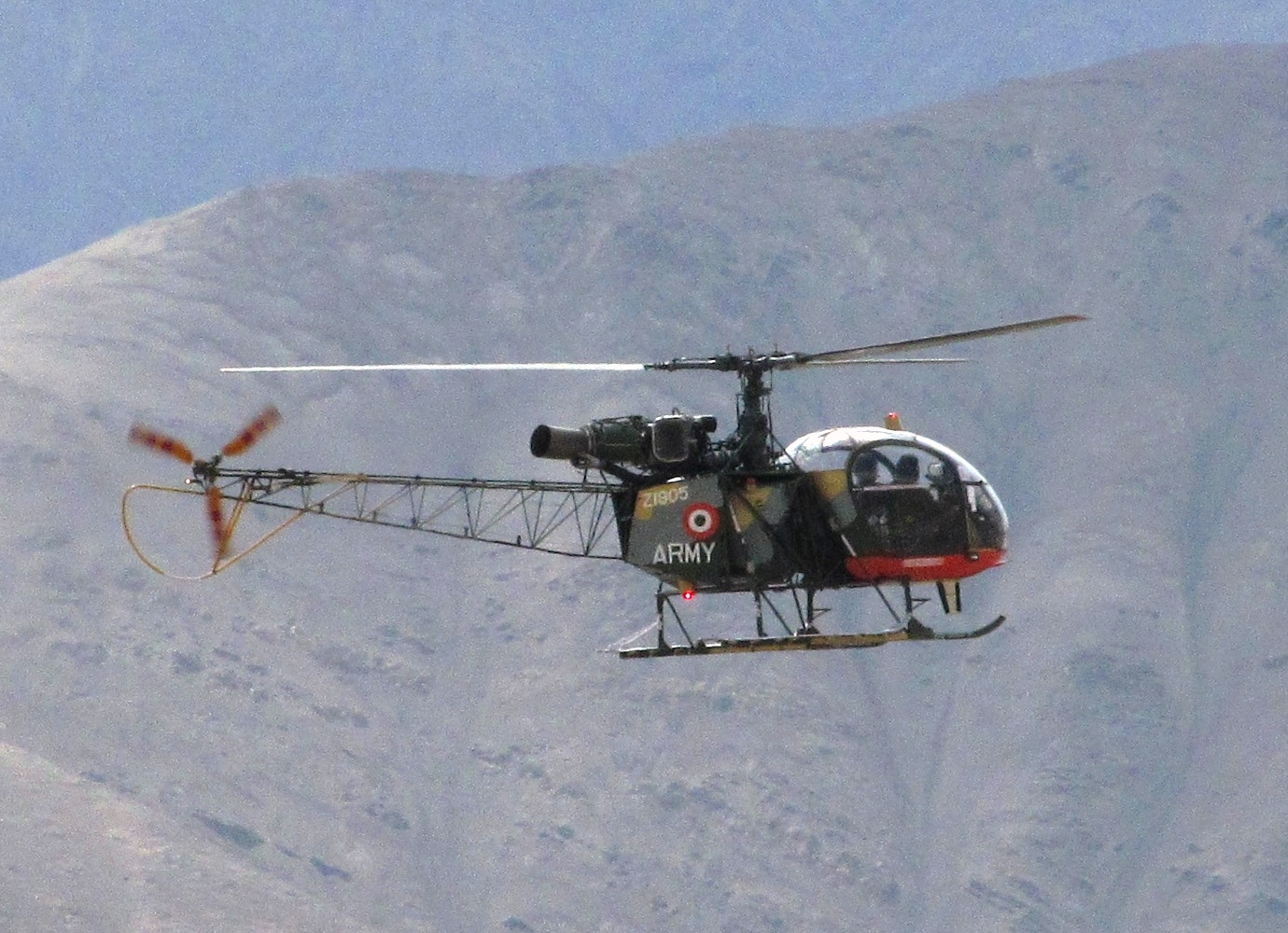
HAL Cheetah flying in Leh

Operation Pawan

During the Indian Peace Keeping Force’s deployment in Sri Lanka, Nos. 10, 26 and 31 R&O Flights supported 54 Infantry Division in the Jaffna peninsula. 664 R&O Squadron eventually moved to Trincomallee in December 1987. The last flight withdrew from the island in March 1990. Cheetahs mounted with two 7.62mm machine guns (called Ranjits) provided useful fire support to the field units.

Kargil War

During Operation Vijay, the corps with its Cheetahs of Nos. 663 and 666 R&O Squadrons and a number of Independent Flights carried out 3100 air sorties of operational flying in support of the Army's 3rd Infantry and 8th Mountain Divisions. It directed intense artillery fire, which turned out to be a turning point in the war, helped induction of special forces and evacuating 900 casualties from temporary and makeshift helipads. For their role, 663 and 666 R&O Squadrons were given COAS unit citations.

Induction of HAL Dhruv

In October 2001, the nomenclature of R&O Squadrons / Flights was changed to Army Aviation Squadrons (R&O) or Army Aviation Flights (R&O). The same year, the first squadron with HAL Dhruv utility helicopters was raised. (No.201 Army Aviation Squadron)

United Nations and other Operations

- A unit of the Army Aviation Corps operated in Somalia as part of United Nations Operation in Somalia II from October 1993 to November 1994. During the operation, the corps flew over 2,000 hours accident-free with 100-percent serviceability in desert-like conditions. In April 2005, a flight of four Cheetahs was positioned with the United Nations Organization Stabilization Mission in the Democratic Republic of the Congo or MONUSCO.
- During 2015 Indian counter-insurgency operation in Myanmar, Army Aviation Corps transported 21 PARA (SF) for Operation Hot Pursuit.
- The corps has taken part in Operation Bajrang from 1990 to 1991 and Operation Rhino in the Brahmaputra Valley and adjacent areas from 1990. During Operation Rahat, there were severe snow storms, which paralysed the Kashmir valley in February 2005. Cheetahs of 663 Army Aviation Squadron evacuated numerous casualties. The same squadron took part in Operation Imdad, the rescue operation during the severe earthquake in North West Kashmir in October 2005. 665 Army Aviation Squadron (R&O) took part in flood relief operations in Maharashtra and Gujrat in 2006. No.1 (Independent) R&O Flight took part in Operation Kosi Prahar, the flood relief operations in Bihar in 2008. No.666 Aviation Squadron (R&O) took part in rescue operations during Operation Cloudburst, after Leh was devastated by flash floods in August 2010.

== Training ==
Before independence, officers were sent to Britain for training in the No. 43 Operational Training Unit (OTU) at Larkhill. After July 1948, the training had shifted to No. 2 Elementary Flying Training School of the Indian Air Force at Jodhpur. The gunnery leg of the Air OP conversion was to be completed at Deolali.

The Combat Army Aviation Training School (CATS) was established in Nashik Road on 1 September 2003. The training was previously conducted at the School of Artillery in Deolali. A Cheetah helicopter simulator was installed at CATS to reduce training costs and pilot risk in 2006. The simulator exposes trainees to snow, rain, varied terrain, night flying, emergencies, and tactical manoeuvres.

Colour presentation

The President of India Mr Ram Nath Kovind, who is also the Supreme Commander of the Armed Forces, presented colours to the Army Aviation Corps on 10 Oct 2019 in a ceremonial parade, which was held at Army Aviation Base, Nasik Road.

Integration of Indian Army UAV Squadrons with Army Aviation

In August 2021, all Unmanned Aerial Vehicles (UAVs) of the Indian Army, many of which were earlier with the Artillery, were moved to the Army Aviation Corps. This bought all aviation assets of the Army under one roof.

== Present day ==
=== Recruitment ===
Army Aviation Corps pilots are drawn from other combat arms, including artillery officers. Officers passing out from the Indian Military Academy can join the corps directly, if they have cleared the Pilot Aptitude Battery Test (PABT). They have a two-year attachment with a fall back arm after getting commissioned. Officers may revert to their parent corps or fall back arm, if they are grounded for any reason.In May 2022 Abhilasha Barak became the first ever woman combat aviator in the Indian Army

=== Role ===
The Army Aviation Corps perform combat search and rescue (CSAR), artillery lift, combat transportation, logistics relief, military prisoner transportation and medical evacuation (MEDEVAC) in wartime and during natural disasters.

The Indian Air Force flies attack helicopters such as the Mil Mi-24/Mi-35 and HAL Rudra, which are under the operational control of the army. Helicopters such as the HAL Chetak, HAL Cheetah and HAL Dhruv provide logistical support for the Indian Army in remote and inaccessible areas.

== Challenges ahead ==
The Corps of Army Aviation still consists of a large number of ageing aircraft like the Cheetah and Chetak, which need replacement by modern helicopters. The predominant role of the corps continues to remain reconnaissance and observation. The absence of medium and heavy lift helicopters, which continues to remain with the Air Force, results in a deficiency of the tactical lift capability in the operational scenario. The delay in acquiring true attack helicopter units, which are integral to battle is a major concern. Lack of fixed wing aircraft, when the Indian Navy, Indian Coast Guard and paramilitary forces have them affects functions like command and control, staff transport, logistics, casualty evacuation and communication.

== Organization ==
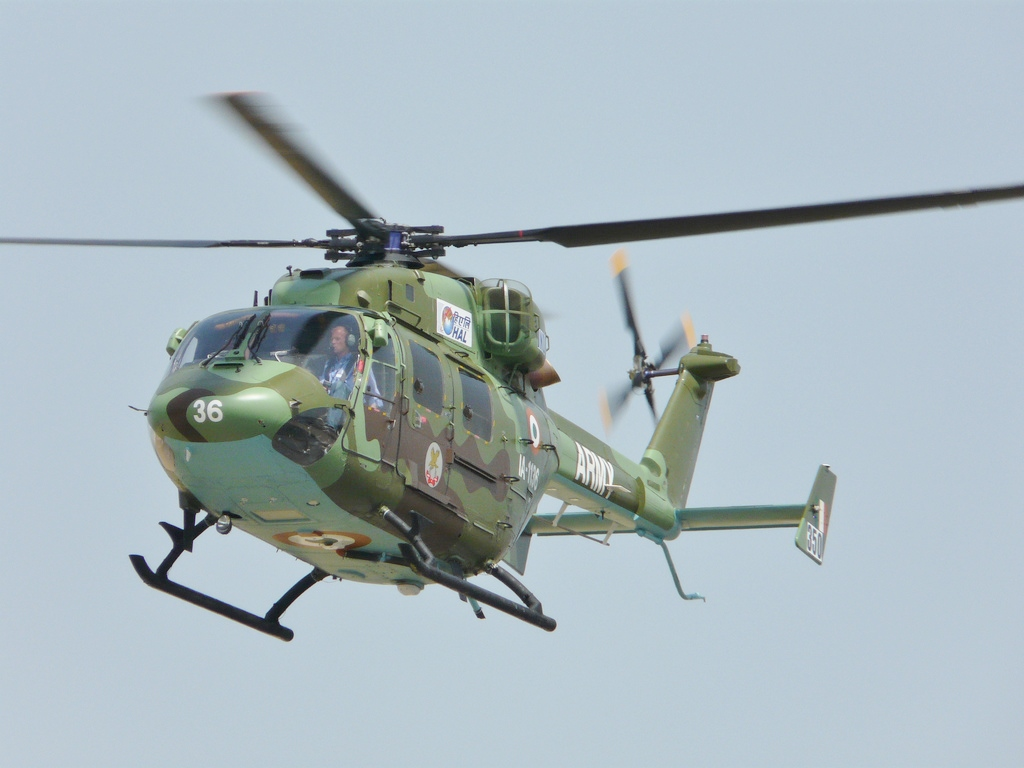
HAL Dhruv of Army Aviation Corps at ILA Berlin Air Show 2008

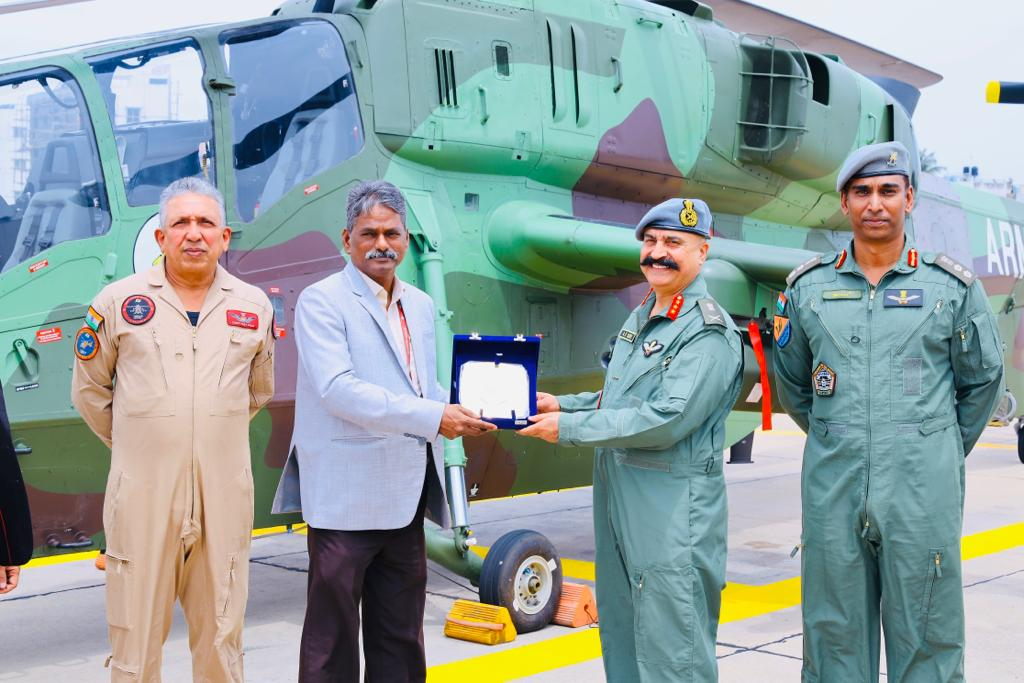
HAL test pilot Wing Commander (retired) Unni K. Pillai and Director General of Army Aviation Corps Lt Gen AK Suri

The Army Aviation Corps has several squadrons. In addition, there are several Reconnaissance and Observation (R&O) flights that operate independently and are not attached to any squadrons. The full list can be accessed here – List of squadrons and flights.

The Corps presently includes the following squadrons:

Squadron	Raising Date	Nickname	Location	Aircraft	References
201 Army Aviation Squadron	2001	Night Raiders	Deolali	Dhruv Utility Helicopters	
202 Army Aviation Squadron		Soaring Gideons	Manasbal	Dhruv Utility Helicopters	
203 Army Aviation Squadron		Ladakh Leviathans	Leh	Dhruv Utility Helicopters	
204 Army Aviation Squadron		Soldiers of the Sky		Dhruv Utility Helicopters	
205 Army Aviation Squadron		Blazing Falcons	Mamun Cantt.	Dhruv Utility Helicopters	
206 Army Aviation Squadron		Hornbills	Missamari	Dhruv Utility Helicopters	
207 Army Aviation Squadron		Magnificent 7		Dhruv Utility Helicopters	
209 Army Aviation Squadron					
251 Army Aviation Squadron		Desert Devils	Jodhpur	Rudra ALH-WSI Helicopters	
252 Army Aviation Squadron		Tridents	Likabali	Rudra ALH-WSI Helicopters	
253 Army Aviation Squadron				Rudra ALH-WSI Helicopters	
254 Army Aviation Squadron			Mamun Cantt.	Rudra ALH-WSI Helicopters	
257 Army Aviation Squadron		The Destroyers		Rudra ALH-WSI Helicopters	
301 Army Aviation Squadron (Special Ops)		Pratham Vishesh		Dhruv Utility and Rudra ALH-WSI Helicopters	
351 Army Aviation Squadron	2022		Missamari	Prachand Light Combat Helicopter	
451 Army Aviation Squadron	2024		Jodhpur	Boeing AH-64 Apache	
659 Army Aviation Squadron	1961		Deolali	Chetak and Cheetah Utility Helicopters	
660 Army Aviation Squadron	1965		Adampur	Chetak and Cheetah Utility Helicopters	
661 Army Aviation Squadron	1967		Nasik Road	Cheetah Utility Helicopters	
662 Army Aviation Squadron	1972		Nagrota	Cheetah/lancer helicopters	
663 Army Aviation Squadron	1973	Snow Leopards	Deolali	Cheetah, Chetak and Dhruv Utility Helicopters	
664 Army Aviation Squadron	1973	Misamari	Jhansi	Chetak and Cheetah Utility Helicopters	
665 Army Aviation Squadron	1973	Daring Hawks	Nasik Road	Cheetah, Chetak and Dhruv Utility Helicopters	
666 Army Aviation Squadron	1982	Siachen Saviours (Battle Honour, Kargil)	Leh	Dhruv Utility Helicopters	
667 Army Aviation Squadron		Eastern Hawks	Missamari	Dhruv Utility Helicopters	
668 Army Aviation Squadron	1991	Desert Chetaks	Bhatinda	Chetak Utility Helicopters	
669 Army Aviation Squadron	1999	Desert Hawks	Leh	Cheetah / Lancer and Rudra ALH-WSI Helicopters	
670 Army Aviation Squadron		Blazing Falcons	Mamun Cantt.	Cheetah Utility Helicopters	
671 Army Aviation Squadron					

In March 2021, a new Army Aviation Brigade with three squadrons was established at Missamari in Assam. The brigade is equipped with Dhruv, Rudra, Cheetah helicopters and Heron unmanned aerial vehicles. As of 2023, there are three Army Aviation Brigades, with one based in Leh, Missamari and Jodhpur each. On 1 June 2022, an attack squadron composed of HAL Prachand was raised. A total of seven squadrons of Prachand are planned with ten helicopters in each one.

On 15 March 2024, an attack squadron was raised at Jodhpur, which will be equipped with Boeing AH-64 Apache. The first batch of three Apache will be inducted in May 2024 and the rest will be inducted by July 2024. As of August 2024, no Apaches were delivered to the Army. Citing delays due to supply chain issues, as of late September 2024, the first batch of three Apache helicopters are to delivered by December 2024 followed by the next 3 within another few months. The first batch of three helicopters finally arrived in India's Hindan Air Force Station on 22 July. The helicopters would equip the attack squadron in Jodhpur.

== Plans ==
In 2012, the army was evaluating helicopters from Kamov, Eurocopter and AgustaWestland for its light-helicopter contract for supplying troops stationed at high altitudes. The $750 million contract for the 197 helicopters intended to replace its 1970s Chetak and Cheetah helicopters for high-altitude surveillance and logistics. The successful bidder would provide 60 helicopters in operating condition; the remaining 137 aircraft would be produced by Hindustan Aeronautics Limited (HAL). The successful bidder was required to invest at least 30 percent of the contract in India. In December 2014, the Kamov Ka-226T was selected as a light utility helicopter to replace the Chetak and Cheetah while the HAL Light Utility Helicopter was developed. Kamov would build a production plant in India, and 197 helicopters would be purchased under the Make in India program. Of these 135 are earmarked for the Indian Army. However the deal was later dead by 2021. The Army was looking at the indigenous HAL Light Utility Helicopter and later placed order for it under limited series production.

Other planned acquisitions are:

- Boeing AH-64 Apache – In Feb 2020, The Indian Army Ordered 6 helicopters which is expected to be delivered in early 2023.
- HAL Light Utility Helicopter (LUH)– The helicopter will replace the fleet of Cheetah and Chetak helicopters. The Indian Army requires 394 light helicopters, which the Defence Ministry decided to meet in two purchases. To meet immediate requirements, 197 light helicopters would be procured on the international market; Hindustan Aeronautics Limited would develop and manufacture 187 HAL Light Utility Helicopter, of which 126 would be for the Indian Army.
- General Atomics MQ-9 Reaper – On 15 March 2024, US sent the Letter of Acceptance (LoA) to the Ministry of Defence for a deal for 31 MQ-9B drones (15 for Navy, and 8 each for Army and Air Force). The document will now be forwarded to the Cabinet Committee on Security (CCS) for final approval.

== See also ==
- Indian Naval Air Arm
- Indian Air Force
