= Turbomeca TM 333 =

1970s French turboshaft engine

TM 333
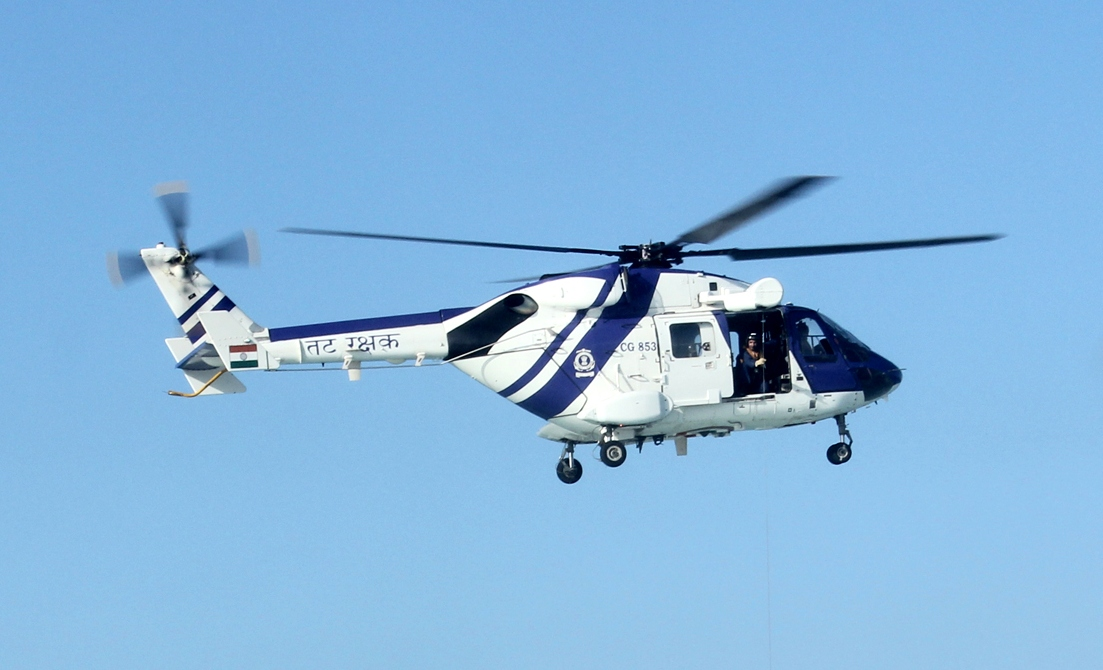
- A TM 333-powered HAL Dhruv
- Type: Turboshaft
- National origin: France
- Manufacturer: Turbomeca
- First run: 1981
- Major applications: HAL Dhruv
- Developed into: Safran Ardiden

The Turbomeca TM 333 is a turboshaft engine manufactured by French company Turbomeca and designed for helicopters weighing 4-5 tonnes. It first ran in August 1981 and was introduced commercially in the mid-1980s. It was the first Turbomeca engine to use a single stage turbine, making it more compact than its predecessors. In its original design, the engine was rated at 750 continuous horsepower, though it was designed to allow for future power increases, and the later 2B2 variant made 1,100 horsepower.

== Variants ==
TM 333 2B2
The TM 333 2B2 powered early versions of the HAL Dhruv, though it was replaced by the Shakti engine, which was jointly developed by HAL and Turbomeca.
TM 333 2M2
The TM333 2M2 is used on the HAL Cheetal and Chetan, upgraded versions of the Cheetah and Chetak, respectively.

== Applications ==
- HAL Dhruv (Mk.1 and Mk.2)
- HAL Cheetal
- HAL Chetak

== Specifications (TM 333 2M2) ==
Data from EASA TCDS E.030 TM333 Series Issue 05

==== General characteristics ====
- Type: Twin-spool turboshaft
- Length: 1,045 mm (41.1 in)
- Diameter: 454 mm (17.9 in) (width), 745 mm (29.3 in) (height)
- Dry weight: 162.5 kg (358.3 lb)

==== Components ====
- Compressor: Two-stage axial, single-stage centrifugal
- Combustors: Annular, reverse flow
- Turbine: Single-stage compressor turbine, single-stage power turbine

==== Performance ====
- Maximum power output: 736 kW (987 shp) (maximum continuous)

== See also ==
Related lists

- List of aircraft engines
