= Kamov Ka-60 =

Utility helicopter

Ka-60 Kasatka
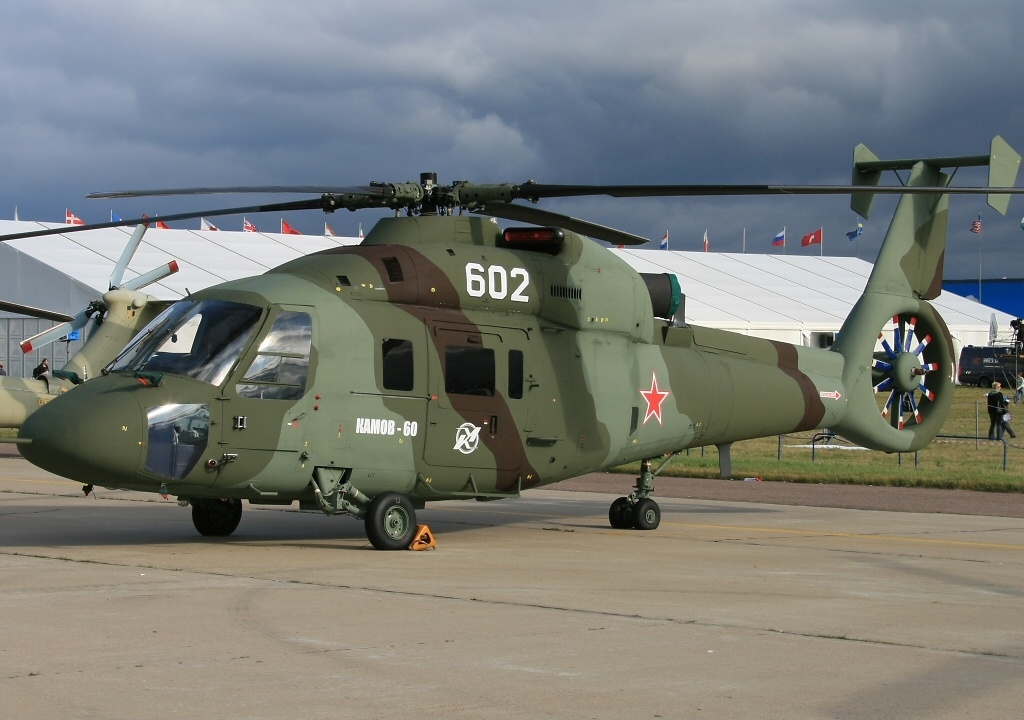
- Kamov Ka-60 prototype in 2009.

General information
- Type: Transport/utility helicopter
- National origin: Russia
- Manufacturer: Kamov
- Number built: 2

History
- First flight: 24 December 1998

The Kamov Ka-60 Kasatka (Russian: "Косатка", "Killer Whale") is a Russian medium twin-turbine military transport helicopter under development by Kamov. It performed its first flight on 24 December 1998.

The civil version is known as Kamov Ka-62.

== Design ==
The Ka-60 has an estimated local military market of 200 units (Army aviation units, Border Police and the Ministry of Internal Affairs). The Ka-60 is to be used for aerial reconnaissance, for transporting air-assault forces, radio-electronic jamming, for special-operations missions and for various light-transport missions. Variations for foreign sale are expected. Manufacture is to take place at Ulan-Ude.

The civil version, the 6.8 t (15,000 lb) Ka-62, can carry up to 15 passengers or 2–2.5 t (4,400–5,500 lb) of cargo (internally or externally), has a top speed of 167 kn (309 km/h) and a range of 380 nmi (700 km). It features a five-blade main rotor and shrouded tail rotor, and is powered by a pair of Safran Ardiden 3Gs, and later by in-development Klimov VK-1600s. It has a 30-minute run-dry gearbox by Zoerkler, and can operate on one engine up to 9,500 ft (2,900 m).

== Development ==
The development of the helicopter was long. The program started in 1984, but the first prototype Ka-60-01 flew in December 1998, and the second in 2007.

A civil version, the Ka-62, was initially proposed when the Ka-60 programme was launched, but no production followed owing to development problems with the Ka-60's Saturn RD-600V 1500 hp engines. Instead, an agreement was signed in April 2011 to use the 1,306 kW (1,751 hp) Turbomeca Ardiden 3G turboshaft for a revised Ka-62. The main rotor will be driven via a new transmission, while the helicopter will have a revised cabin with larger windows and new avionics. First flight of the Ka-62 was planned for May 2013, with certification in 2014. Four prototypes and an initial batch of 16 Ka-62s for the Russian Ministry of Defence were planned, with another 12 ordered by South American civilian customers. Russian certification was expected in 2018, with European EASA certification following in 2020.

The Ka-62 was unveiled in 2012 and flight tests began in 2017. After 434 test flights with three prototypes during 700h, it was certified on 30 November 2021 by Russian regulator Rosaviatsia. Deliveries should begin in 2022, planned production is six units in 2022, eight in 2023 and 10 in 2024. A cargo hook, a winch, a medical module and an anti-icing system should be certified until 2024.

The development and certification of the Ka-62 was suspended in late 2022 due to Western sanctions and the large number of foreign-made components (including the French-manufactured engine). About 60% of the Ka-62's parts had been sourced from Western suppliers, and could no longer be imported.

In 2023, a spokesman for the manufacturer confirmed that design work on the helicopter type was ongoing, including a possible effort to substitute Russian-made parts for the Western parts no longer available.

== Variants ==
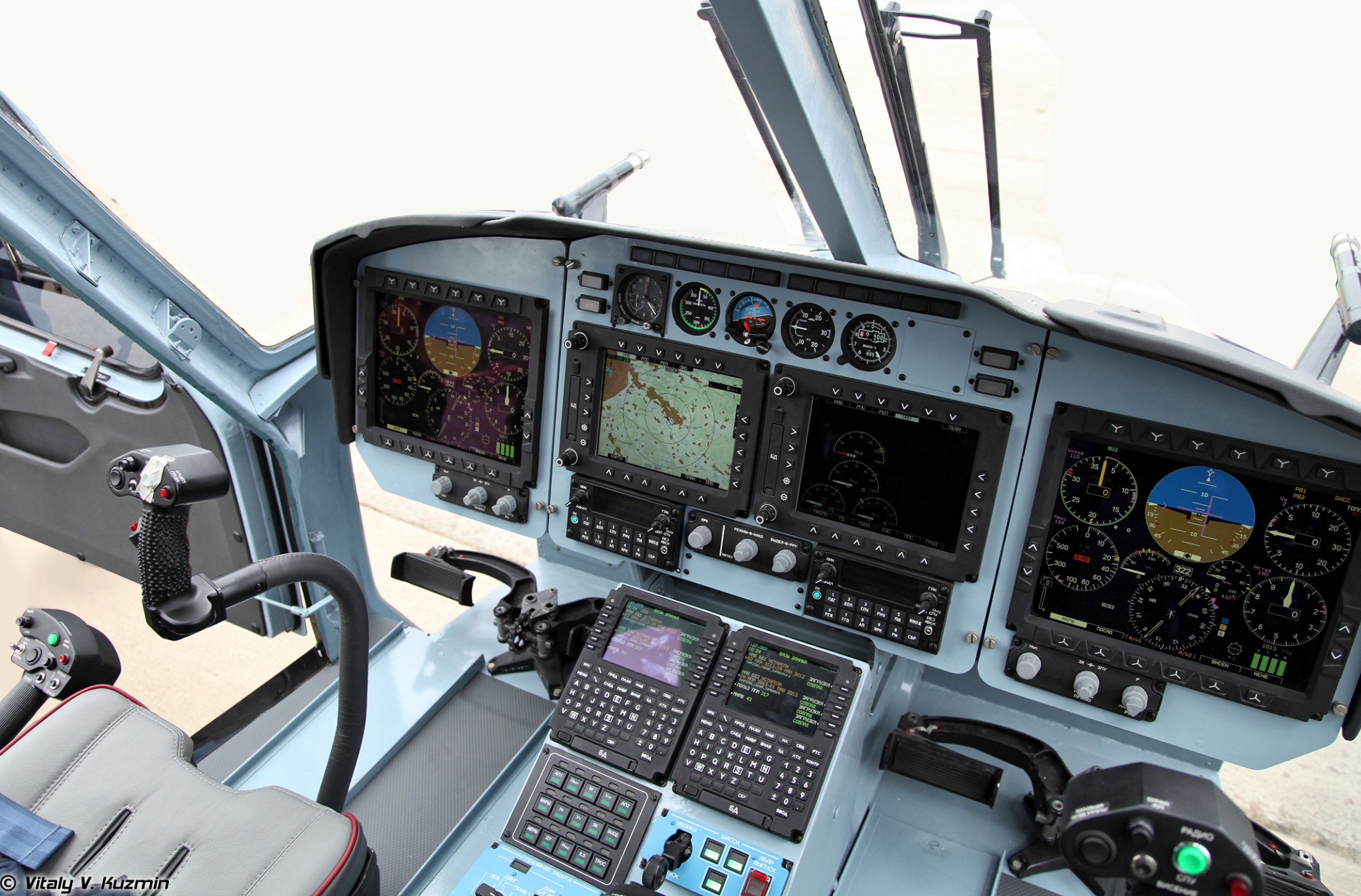
Ka-62 glass cockpit

Ka-60
Basic multi-role model.
Ka-60U
Training version.
Ka-60K
Naval version.
Ka-60R
Reconnaissance version.
Ka-62
New version for the civilian market. It has a redesigned fuselage with a high degree of composites, a larger cabin than the earlier demonstrators and will be equipped with Turbomeca Ardiden 3G engines.
Ka-64 Sky Horse
Western certified export version equipped with two General Electric T700/CT7 turboshaft engines and five-blade main rotor.

== Operators ==
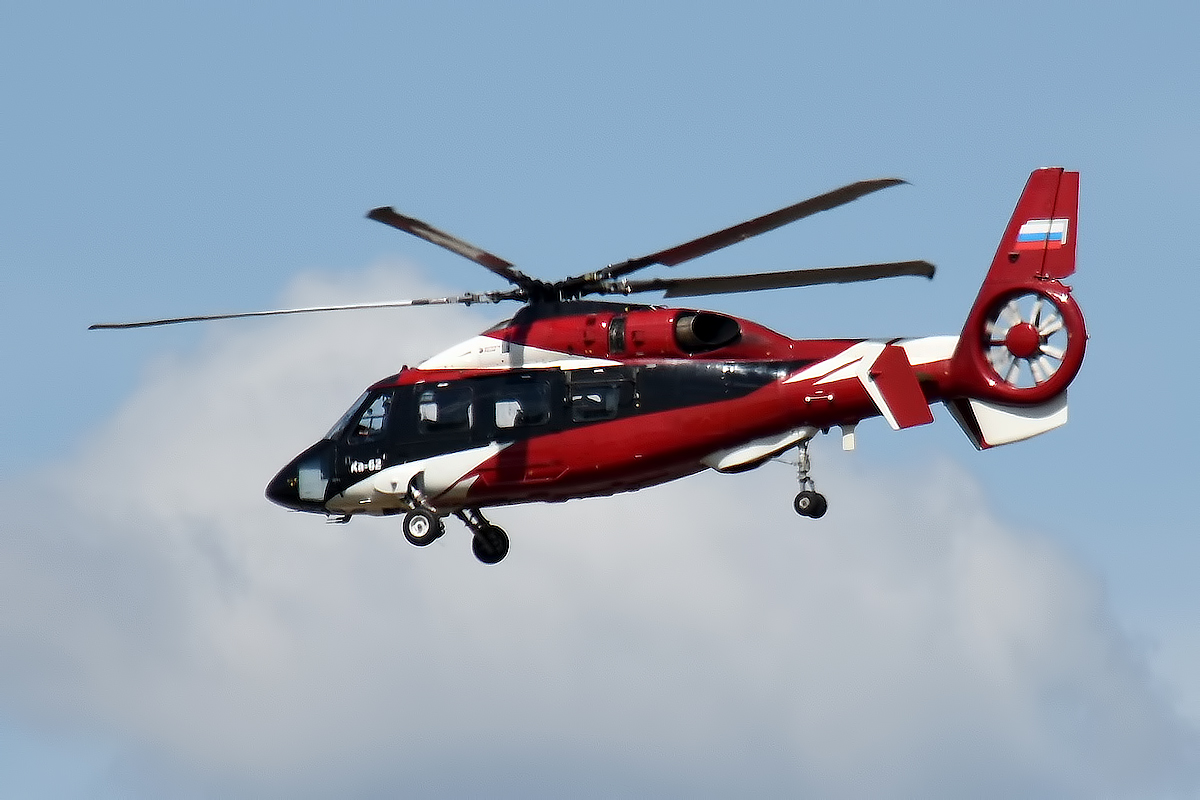
Ka-62 serial configuration prototype

Russia

- Russian Aerospace Forces (100 on order)

Brazil

- Atlas Taxi Aereo (7 on order)

Colombia

- Vertical de Aviación (5 on order)

== Specifications ==
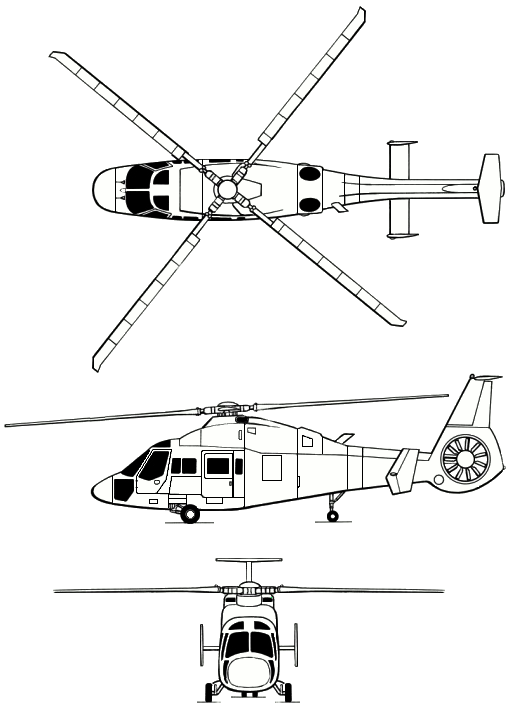

Data from Jane's All The World's Aircraft 2003–2004, Russian Helicopters

General characteristics

- Crew: 1 or 2
- Capacity: 12–15 passengers (Ka-62)
  - 14 infantry troops or 6 stretchers
  - Internal 2,000 kg (4,409 lb)
  - External 2,500 kg (5,512 lb)
- Length: 15.6 m (51 ft 2 in) overall
- Height: 4.6 m (15 ft 1 in)
- Max takeoff weight: 6,500 kg (14,330 lb)
- Powerplant: 2 × Turbomeca Ardiden 3G turboshaft, 1,324 kW (1,776 shp) each
- Main rotor diameter: 13.5 m (44 ft 3 in)
- Main rotor area: 143.1 m^{2} (1,540 sq ft)

Performance

- Maximum speed: 308 km/h (191 mph, 166 kn)
- Cruise speed: 290 km/h (180 mph, 160 kn)
- Range: 770 km (480 mi, 420 nmi)
- Service ceiling: 5,700 m (18,700 ft)
- Hover ceiling: 3,300 m (10,827 ft)

== See also ==
Aircraft of comparable role, configuration, and era

- AgustaWestland AW139
- Airbus Helicopters H155
- Bell 430
- Bell UH-1Y Venom
- Eurocopter AS365 Dauphin / Harbin Z-9
- Eurocopter AS565 Panther
- Sikorsky S-76
- Sikorsky UH-60 Black Hawk
- TAI T625 Gökbey

Related lists

- List of rotorcraft

== Sources ==
- Butowski, Piotr. "Russia's Restyled Helicopter". Air International, September 2012, Vol. 82 No. 3. pp. 66–67. ISSN 0306-5634.
- Butowski, Piotr. Rosyjskie śmigłowce: kryzys nie mija. Helirussia, Moskwa, 25–27 maja 2017 r., "Lotnictwo Aviation International" Nr. 7/2017, p. 44–45 (in Polish)
- Jackson, Paul. Jane's All The World's Aircraft 2003–2004. Coulsdon, UK:Jane's Information Group, 2003. ISBN 0-7106-2537-5.
- Mladenov, Alexander. "Kamov's Six Tonne Twin". Air International, January 2014, Vol.86, No. 1. pp. 74–75. ISSN 0306-5634.
- Maldenov, Alexander. "Ka-62". Air International, June 2016, Vol. 90, No. 6. pp. 6–7. ISSN 0306-5634.
- "Nezavisimaya Gazeta", No.241 (1812), 25 December 1998. translation
