= HAL HTSE-1200 =

Turboshaft engine

HTSE-1200
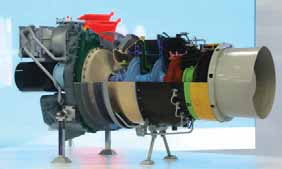
- HTSE 1200 Turbo-shaft engine model
- Type: Turboshaft
- National origin: India
- Manufacturer: Hindustan Aeronautics Limited
- First run: 12 February 2018
- Major applications: HAL Dhruv; HAL Rudra; HAL Prachand; HAL Light Utility Helicopter
- Number built: 1 (TD)

The HAL HTSE-1200 ("Hindustan Turbo Shaft Engine") is a turboshaft engine under development by India's Hindustan Aeronautics Limited (HAL). It is aimed at 3.5 ton single engine class and 5-8 ton twin engine class helicopter configurations. India will need 5,000-6,000 helicopters to operate in 2020s. This will be an indigenous design giving engine alternatives for the HAL-developed LUH, ALH and LCH. The first run of engine was conducted in February 2018 when it achieved 76% of the rpm required.

There have been 250 tests of the engine since inaugural run. The engine has been "progressing well" to have its first flight test by end of 2019. Directionally Solidified Gas Generator (GG) Turbine blades were also developed for the engine indigenously.

According to the Annual Report 2020-21 of Hindustan Aeronautics Limited, HTSE 1200 achieved 100% speed run on core engine. Sea level trials of core engine were completed successfully. HAL Engine Division at Koraput in association with Defence Metallurgical Research Laboratory (DMRL) has developed Single Crystal Blade samples. HAL has also completed the manufacturing of parts and modular assemblies for Power mode engine. HAL is set to start limited series production of engine from 2021 end, which will be for 5 units for further testing. HAL has completed High altitude cold weather trials of Jet Mode Engine at Leh and High altitude hot weather trials of Jet Mode Engine at Leh, South Pullu and Khardung La. Run of Power mode engine to 80% of the speed achieved.

As of 13 September 2024, fabrication of 5 prototype engines is underway and delivery is scheduled to start in mid-2025. The core has achieved 100% RPM milestone and completed sea-level trials while limited series production is to start soon. There are plans to integrate the engines with HAL Dhruv prototypes for in-flight evaluation.

As of July 2026, the engine has been tested up to 650kW at HAL test cell. Further trials are in progress.

== Specifications (HTSE-1200) ==
Data from

==== General characteristics ====
- Type: turboshaft
- Length: 51.18 inches (1.300 m)
- Diameter: 0.55 m
- Dry weight: 235 kilograms (518 lb)

==== Components ====
- Compressor: Two Stage Centrifugal Compressor
- Combustors: Effusion cooled combustor
- Turbine: Free Power turbine

==== Performance ====
- Maximum power output: 1,600 shp (1,200 kW)
- Specific fuel consumption: ~0.296kg/kW-hr

== See also ==
Related development

- HAL HTFE-25

Comparable engines

- LHTEC CTS800
- MTR390
- Pratt & Whitney Canada PT6
- Safran Arrano
- Safran Ardiden

Related lists

- List of aircraft engines
