= Abhilasha Barak =

First Indian woman combat aviator in army

Abhilasha Barak is an officer in the Indian Army from Haryana. She completed her graduation from Delhi Technological University in 2016. She did her training from Officers Training Academy Chennai in 2017. She is known for becoming the first woman combat aviator in the Indian Army in 2022. She completed her one year of training from the Combat Army Aviation Training School at Nashik in Maharashtra.

Major Abhilasha Barak of India has been named the 2025 Military Gender Advocate of the Year in recognition of her outstanding leadership in promoting gender-responsive peacekeeping and advancing the Women, Peace and Security agenda during her deployment with the United Nations Interim Force in Lebanon (UNIFIL) since June 2025. Serving as Engagement Team Commander and Gender Focal Point within the Indian Battalion, in Sector East, southern Lebanon, Major Barak integrates gender perspectives into military operations, patrols and civil-military activities, ensuring that operational decisions reflect the realities and needs of women and vulnerable groups.

== Early life ==
Barak is from Rohtak, Haryana. She is the daughter of a retired colonel. She was born in Military Hospital, Wellington when her father was undergoing a course at Defence Services Staff College. She was commissioned into the Army Air Defence Corps in September 2018. She led the contingent for Corps of Army Air Defence on 28 Sep 2019 when former President Ram Nath Kovind awarded the President's Colours to the Corps on completion of 25 years of service.

== Awards and Recognition ==
On June 7th, 2026, Prime Minister Shri Narendra Modi congratulated Major Abhilasha Barak on being conferred the UN Military Gender Advocate of the Year Award. The Prime Minister noted that Major Barak is serving as an Engagement Team Commander and Gender Focal Point within the United Nations Interim Force in Lebanon (UNIFIL).

Shri Modi observed that "this honour is a recognition of her exemplary service and also of India’s longstanding contribution to United Nations peacekeeping efforts."

The Prime Minister also stated that "her achievement is also an inspiration to countless young Indians, especially the daughters of the nation, who aspire to serve the country and humanity."
