= Aérospatiale SA 315B Lama =

Utility helicopter

SA 315B Lama
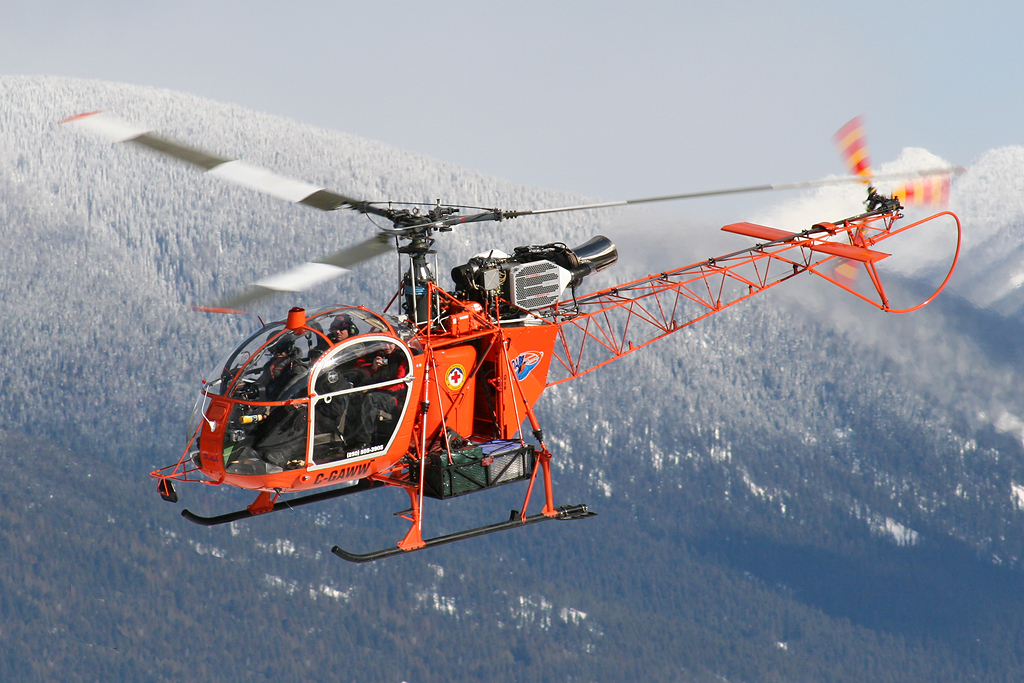
- An SA 315B Lama in flight

General information
- Type: Utility helicopter
- National origin: France
- Manufacturer: Aérospatiale
- Built by: Helibras; Hindustan Aeronautics Limited (HAL)
- Status: In service
- Primary user: Afghan Air Force; Indian Air Force

History
- Introduction date: July 1971
- First flight: 17 March 1969
- Developed from: Aérospatiale Alouette II

The Aérospatiale SA 315B Lama is a French single-engined helicopter. It combines the lighter Aérospatiale Alouette II airframe with Alouette III components and powerplant. The Lama possesses exceptional high altitude performance.

The helicopters have been built under licence by Hindustan Aeronautics Limited (HAL) in India, known as the Cheetah; HAL later developed an upgraded variant, powered by the Turbomeca TM 333-2M2 engine, which is known as the Cheetal. An armed version, marketed as the Lancer, was also produced by HAL. It was also built under licence by Helibras in Brazil as the Gavião.

== Design and development ==
The SA 315B Lama was originally designed to meet a Nepalese Army Air Service and Indian Air Force requirement for a rotorcraft capable of undertaking operations at hot and high conditions. Both countries possessed extreme mountain ranges in the form of the Himalayas in which even relatively powerful medium-sized helicopters could not be effectively operated within, thus there was an expressed desire for an aerial vehicle capable of operating in this challenging environment. To achieve the desired performance, Aerospatiale elected to combine elements of two existing popular helicopters in their inventory, the Aérospatiale Alouette II and the Aérospatiale Alouette III to produce a new rotorcraft specialised for high altitude performance. Specifically, the new helicopter, named Lama, was equipped with the Alouette III's Turbomeca Artouste turboshaft powerplant and its dynamic systems, and was furnished with a reinforced version of the Alouette II's airframe.

On 17 March 1969, the first SA 315B, powered by an Artouste IIB engine, undertook its maiden flight. On 30 September 1970, the type received its airworthiness certificate, and it was introduced to operational service in July 1971. Due to its favourable high altitude performance, the Lama quickly became popular with operators worldwide, often being deployed within mountainous environments. As with the Alouette series, the type can be fitted for various roles, such as light passenger transport, agricultural tasks, oil-and-gas exploration, aerial firefighting, and other specialised duties. The military variants of the Lama include liaison, observation, photography, air/sea rescue, transport and ambulance duties. The SA315B is particularly suited to mountainous areas due to its performance and can carry underslung loads of up to 1000 kg (2,205 lb). By December 1976, 191 Lamas had been ordered by 68 operators.

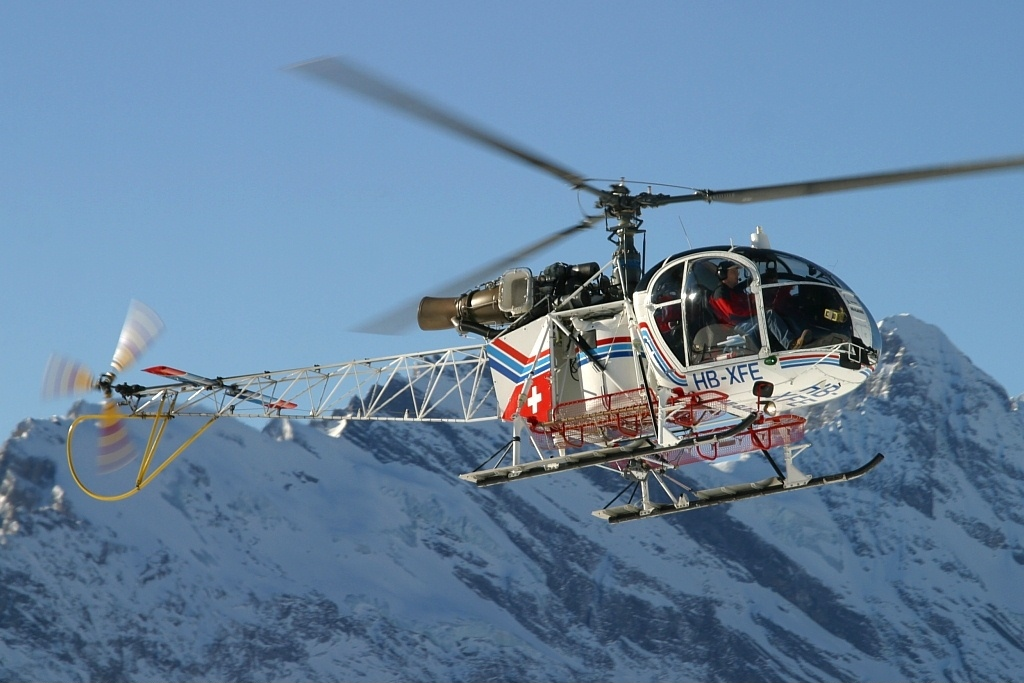
SA 315B Lama, 2007

A large proportion of all SA 315B Lamas to be manufactured were produced under licence in India by Hindustan Aeronautics Limited (HAL), under the name Cheetah. More than three decades after production in India began, HAL was still receiving export orders for the original Cheetah. Along with the Alouette III, the Cheetah was a key product for HAL; experience from manufacturing the type aided in the later development of more advanced indigenous helicopters such as the HAL Dhruv. During the 1990s, HAL developed an armed light attack helicopter based upon the Cheetah, which was given the name Lancer.

In 2006, HAL proposed a modernised variant to the Indian Army, designated as Cheetal, the principal change of which was the adoption of a modern, more powerful Turbomeca TM 333-2M2 powerplant in the place of the Artouste; HAL promoting the Cheetal's capabilities for operating in high altitude environments, such as the Siachen Glacier. Other improvements include new warning indicates, a cockpit voice recorder, flight monitoring system, artificial horizon, and modernised electronics. In 2006, an initial 10 Cheetals were ordered by the Indian Air Force. In February 2013, it was announced that the Indian and Nepalese Armies had signed a 300 crore (~US$55 million) contract for the urgent procurement of a further 20 Cheetals.

== Operational history ==
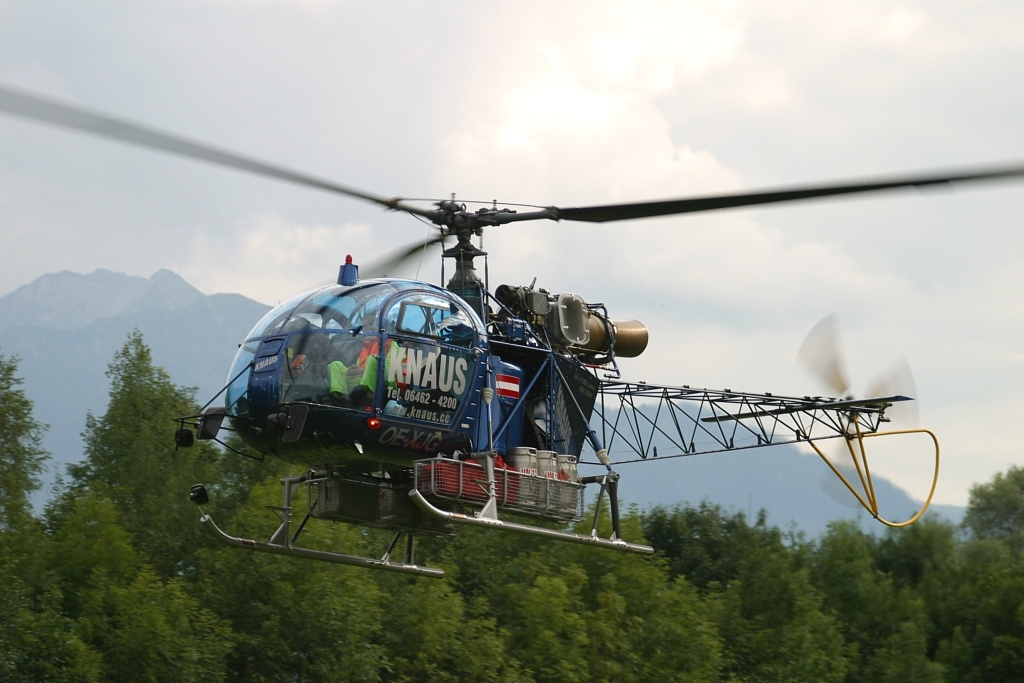
SA 315B Lama, 2003

The Lama was developed specifically to provide a rotorcraft with exceptional high-altitude performance. In practice, the type found considerable use within regions that possessed extensive mountain ranges, such as South America and India, being capable of lifting loads and deploying personnel in areas that had been previously impossible to have otherwise achieved.

During 1969, a series of early demonstration flights involving the SA 315B were performed in the Himalayas; during one such flight, a single rotorcraft carrying a crew of two and 120 kg of fuel landed and then took off at what was then the highest altitude to be recorded, 7,500 m (24,605 ft). On 21 June 1972, a Lama with a single pilot (Jean Boulet) aboard established a helicopter absolute altitude record of 12,442 m (40,814 ft), a record which still stands as of June 2022. During the same flight, the Lama's engine flamed out at the peak altitude of the flight, which led to an inadvertent record being set for the longest ever autorotation after which the rotorcraft was brought to a safe unpowered landing. Days before, the same pilot and aircraft had set a similar record at a higher weight.

Following in the aftermath of the records set by the helicopter, a major order was placed by the Indian government in 1971. The Indian order included an arrangement for the indefinite licence production of the SA 315B to be conducted by Hindustan Aeronautics Limited (HAL) at their facility in Bangalore, India. The first Indian-assembled SA 315B flew on 6 October 1972, with deliveries starting in December 1973; Indian-produced helicopters were given the name Cheetah. Operated by both the Indian Air Force and the Indian Army's Aviation Corps, the Cheetah have proved capable, operating in difficult and remote areas such the mountainous Siachen region, and during times of conflict with neighbouring Pakistan. Cheetahs have also been operated for civil purposes, such as aerial agriculture.

HAL-built Lamas have also been procured by neighbouring Nepal for military use. Sales have included a quantity of an armed variant, marketed as the HAL Lancer; one batch was reportedly delivered to Nepal between June 2003 and September 2004. The sale of Lancers to Nepal encountered international controversy due to allegations that these rotorcraft have participated in combat operations against members of the Communist Party of Nepal during the Nepalese Civil War.

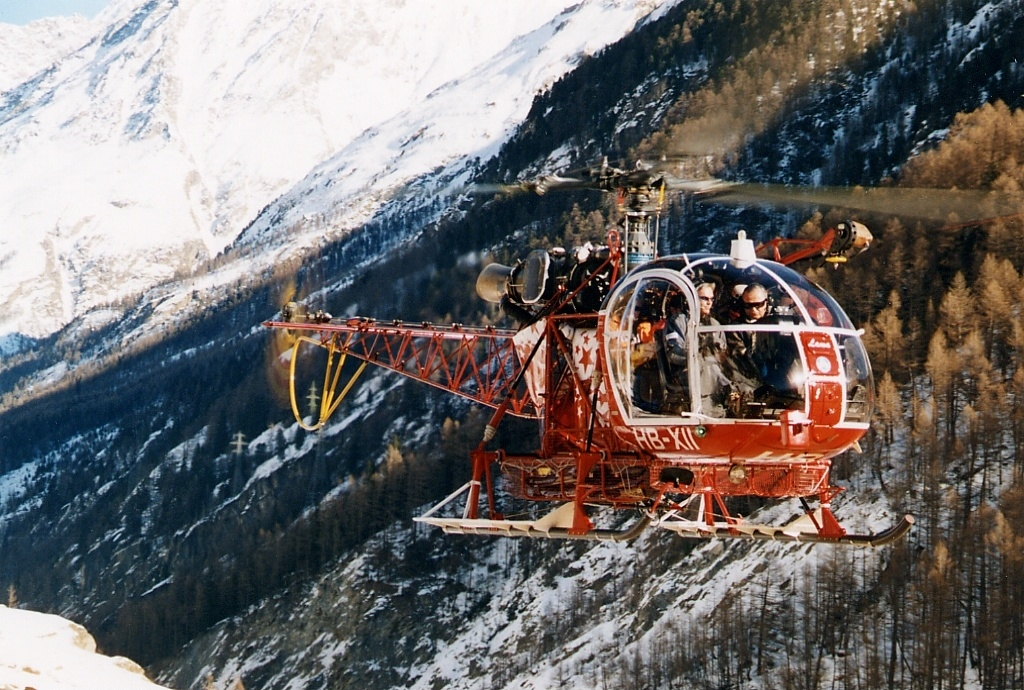
SA 315B Lama, 2003

In addition to India, other countries have participated in licence production activities. In 1978, an export agreement was reached with Brazilian aircraft manufacturer Helibras, under which it would perform domestic assembly of the Lama. Such Helibras-produced SA 315Bs were marketed under the designation Gavião; (Hawk) several examples of which were successfully exported to neighboring Bolivia.

In later life, the Lama's commercial appeal waned in favour of the newer Eurocopter AS350 Écureuil, which had lower maintenance requirements and was capable of higher speeds but incapable of equalling the Lama's high altitude performance. The type remained in commercial service into the 21st century, being only slowly retired as it typically continued to be adequate for its given tasks. According to Vertical Magazine, popular qualities of the Lama included its capable engine, favourable stability while hovering, and its ability to effectively convey payloads at altitude even during peak temperatures.

In 2009, due to issues with the newly introduced HAL Dhruv helicopter, the Indian Army increased operational usage of their older Cheetah/Cheetal rotorcraft to meet the temporary shortfall. In September 2012, it was reported that an ever-decreasing amount of spare parts compatible with the Cheetah has led to the type's operators being required to cannibalise helicopters in order to provide components for others. In August 2016, it was reported that No. 114 Helicopter Unit were keen to introduce the upgraded Cheetal as a replacement for its existing Cheetah rotorcraft for continuous deployment on the Siachen Glacier.

== Variants ==
SA 315B Lama
Derived from the SE 3150, it was designed for high altitude operations using a 650 kW (870 hp) Turbomeca Astazou IIIB turboshaft, derated to 410 kW (550shp). This derivative still holds the absolute altitude record for all types of helicopters since 1972: 12,442 m.
HB 315B Gaviao
Brazilian licence-built version of the SA 315B Lama.
HAL Cheetah
Indian licence-built version of the SA 315B Lama.
HAL Lancer
Modified armed combat variant. Changes include composite armouring, toughened glass, and gun sights. Armaments include two jettisonable weapons pods, each of which contains a single 12.7-mm machine gun and up to three 70-mm rockets.
HAL Cheetah
Modernised Indian variant, fitted with the Turbomeca TM333-2M2 for high altitudes operations. Speed is increased to 210 km/h (130 mph) and range is increased to 640 km (400 mi). It has a payload capacity of 90 kg (200 lb) at 6 km (20,000 ft)-altitude and an endurance of 3.5 hours. The engine is fitted with a FADEC system for engine control and an Electronic Backup Control Box (EBCB) system. Additional features include modern cockpit instruments, such as electric-powered artificial horizon, directional gyro, flight monitoring system, cockpit voice recorder, as well as a master flasher warning system. First flight in January 2003. On 2 November, 2004 the helicopter set a world record of highest landing record at 7,070 meters in Himalayas. 10 order by Indian Air Force in 2006 and 20 ordered by Indian Army in 2013. All delivered.

== Operators ==
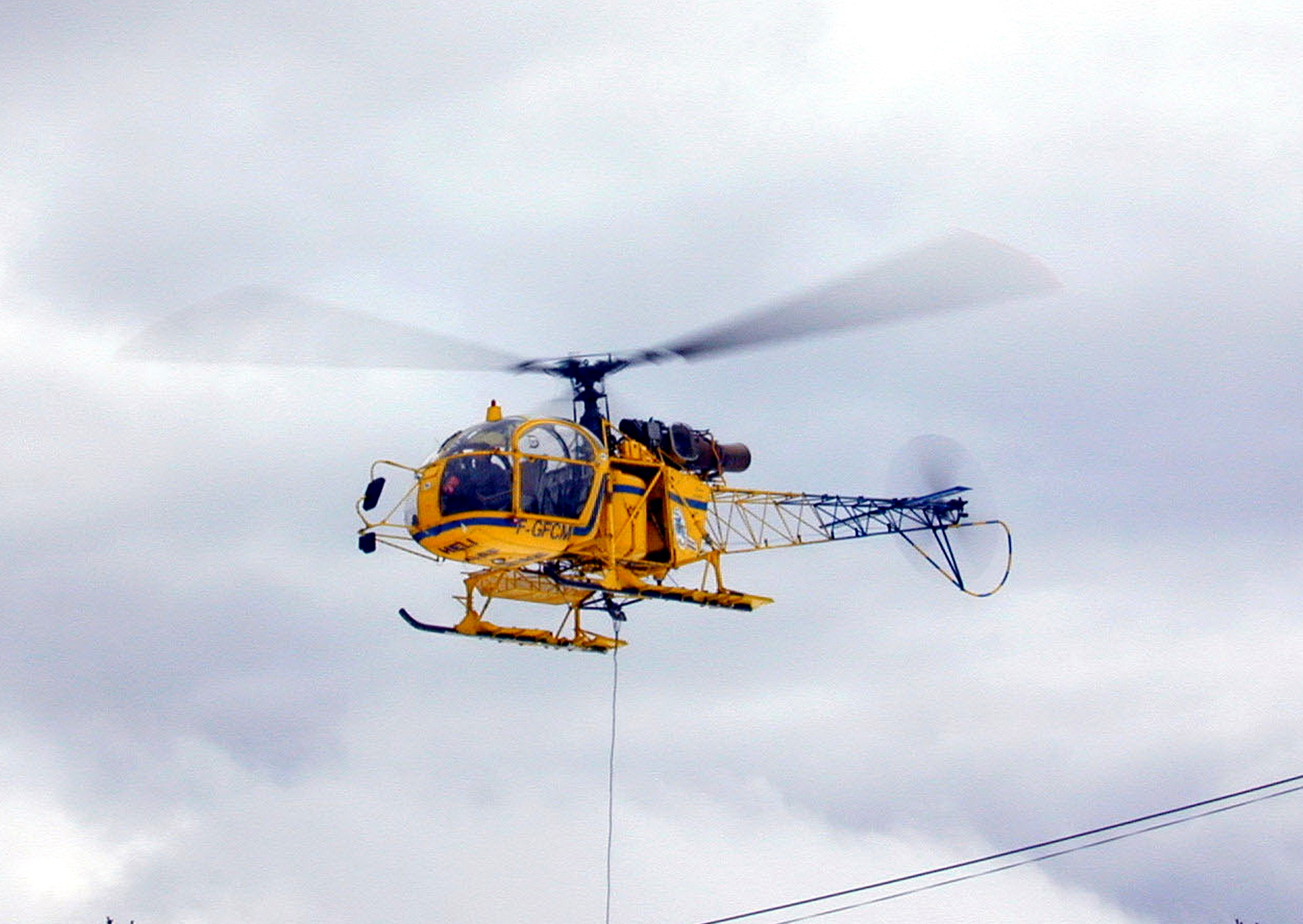
A Search-and-Rescue SA 315B Lama in Gréolières, 2015

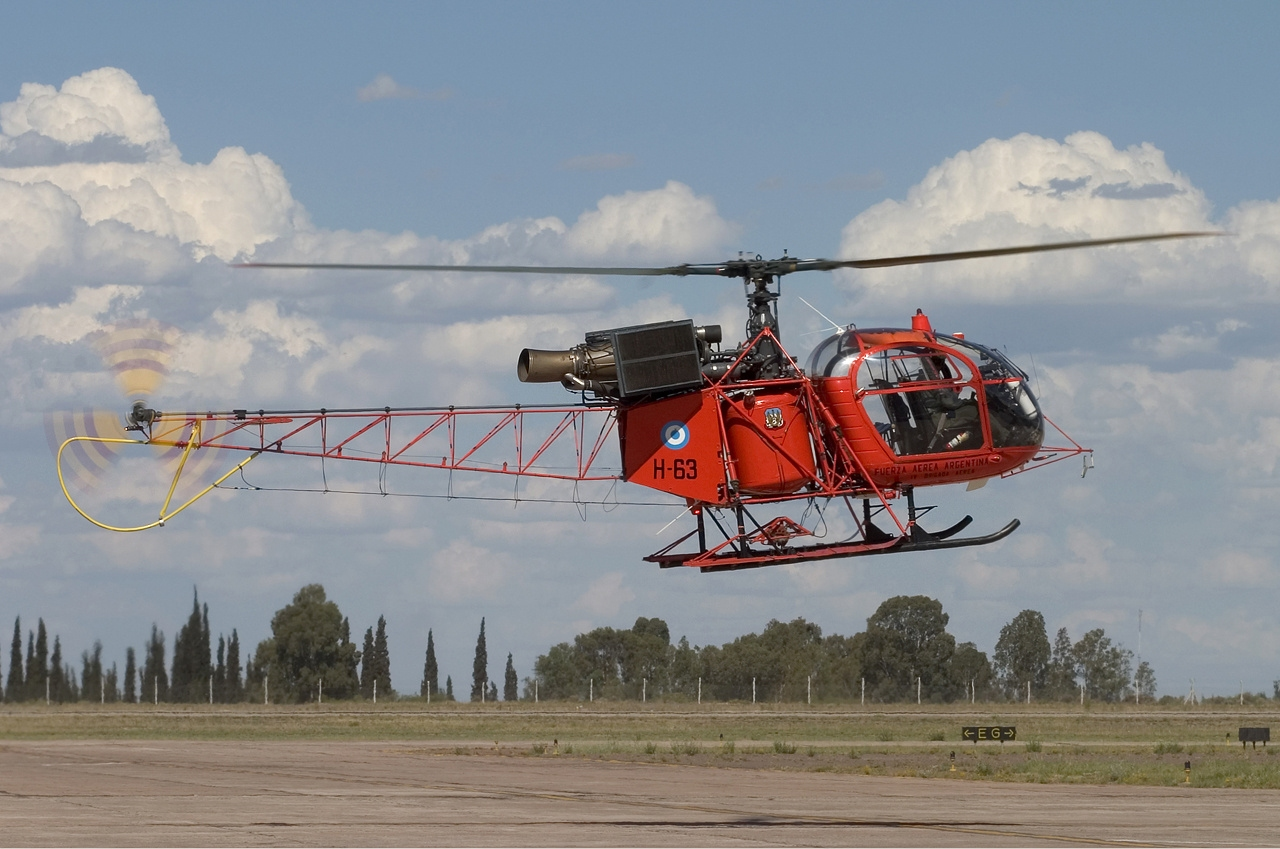
An Argentine Air Force Aerospatiale SA 315 lifting off from Gabrielli International Airport

Afghanistan

- Afghan Air Force

Argentina

- Argentine Air Force
- Argentine Army

India

- Indian Army

Namibia

- Namibian Air Force

Pakistan

- Pakistan Army

Togo

- Togolese Air Force

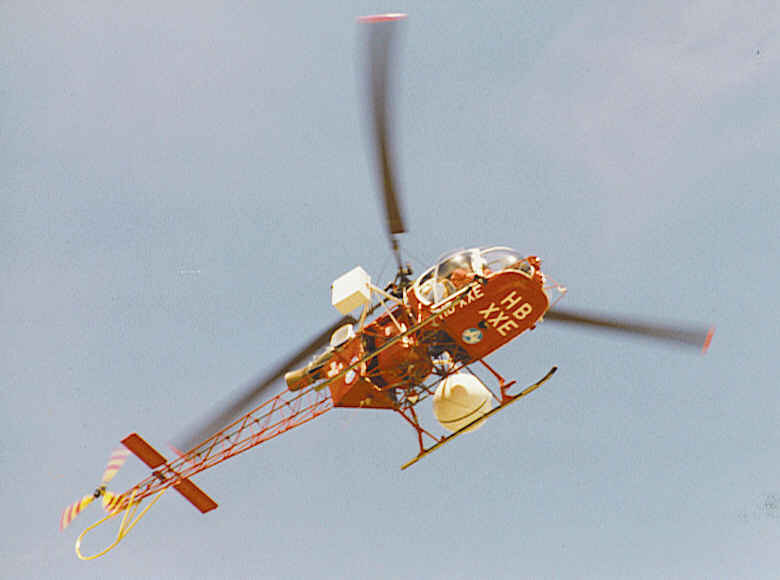
A 1990-built Swiss-operated Lama

=== Former operators ===
Angola

- Angolan Air Defence Force

Argentina

- National Gendarmerie

Bolivia

- Bolivian Air Force

Chile

- Chilean Army

Ecuador

- Ecuadorian Air Force
- Ecuadorian Army Retired 22 January 2025

El Salvador

- Salvadoran Air Force

India

- Indian Air Force

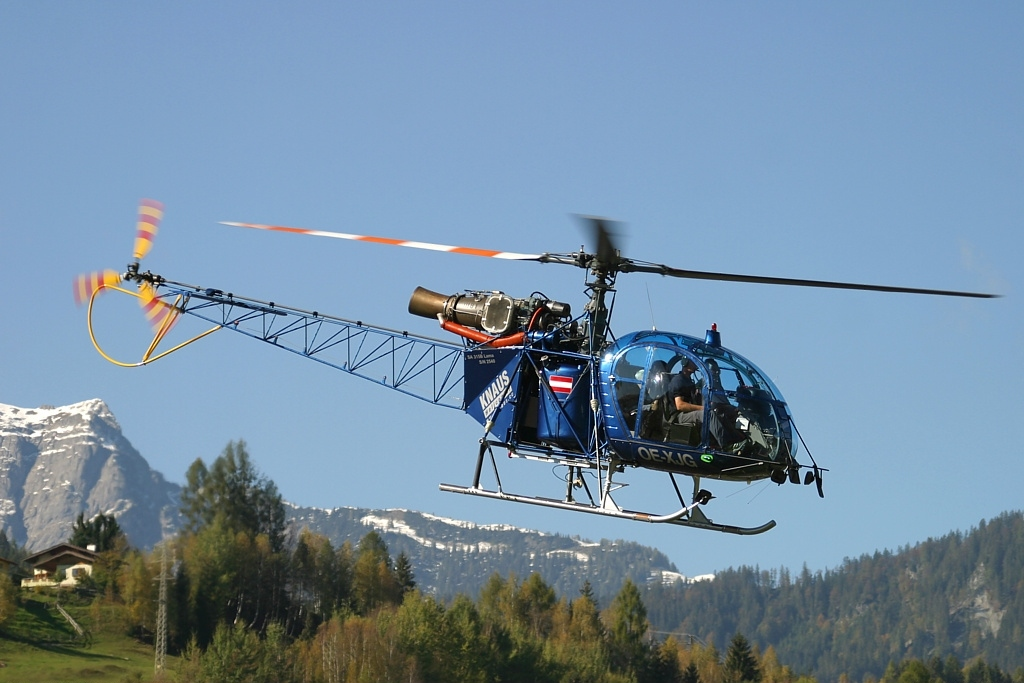
SA315B Lama lifting off from St Johann im Pongau

Morocco

- Royal Moroccan Gendarmerie

Nepal

- Nepal Army

Peru

- Peruvian Army

== Specifications (SA 315B Lama) ==
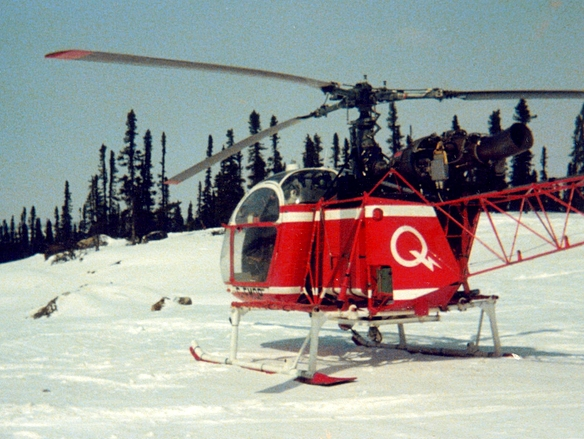
View of a SA 315B Lama; note the three-bladed main rotor

Data from Jane's All The World's Aircraft 1982–83

General characteristics

- Crew: 1
- Capacity: 4 passengers or 1,135 kg (2,500 lb) slung payload
- Length: 10.24 m (33 ft 7.25 in)
- Height: 3.09 m (10 ft 1.75 in)
- Empty weight: 1,021 kg (2,251 lb)
- Gross weight: 2,300 kg (5,070 lb)
- Powerplant: 1 × Turbomeca Artouste IIIB turboshaft , 649 kW (870 hp) derated to 410 kW (550 hp)
- Main rotor diameter: 11.02 m (36 ft 1.75 in)
- Main rotor area: 95.38 m^{2} (1,026 sq ft)

Performance

- Maximum speed: 192 km/h (119 mph, 103 kn)
- Range: 515 km (320 mi, 280 nmi)
- Service ceiling: 5,400 m (17,715 ft)
- Rate of climb: 5.5 m/s (1,080 ft/min)

== See also ==
External videos
- Footage of SA 315B Lamas performing aerobatic manoeuvres
- Video of Lama operations amongst mountainous terrain
- A Lama performing several utility flights in the Alps

Related development

- Aérospatiale Alouette II
- Aérospatiale Alouette III

Related lists

- List of rotorcraft
