= MKU (company) =

Indian defense company

MKU Ltd
- Type: Private
- Industry: Defence
- Founded: 1985; 41 years ago
- Headquarters: Kanpur, India
- Area served: Global
- Key people: Neeraj Gupta (Managing Director)

MKU is headquartered in Kanpur, Uttar Pradesh, India. The company is a manufacturer of optronics devices like night vision binoculars and monoculars, personal and platform armour including ballistic helmets, armour inserts, bulletproof vests, Ballistic Shields & Briefcases for military, paramilitary, homeland security, police & Special Forces with a customer base in over 100 countries.

== History ==
MKU was set up in 1985 to build fibre-reinforced plastic products for the Indian Army. It now provides protection to over 30 lakh (3 million) soldiers and 3000 plus platforms. Its products are used by 230 forces in over 100 countries worldwide including the United Nations and NATO.

The company started off with the manufacturing of locks. In 1985, M Kumar Udyog was founded for manufacturing and supply of defence specific requirements of the Indian Army, with its first lot of FRP helmets being shipped out in 1989.

By 1993 footwear manufacturing unit was commissioned. The company further diversified in 1997 and entered into plywood manufacturing business. Subsequently, a separate manufacturing unit was set up for catering to the growing demand of plywood in India. In the same year a bitumen manufacturing plant was commissioned for supplies to the emerging road construction requirements of India.

== Management ==
Manoj Gupta is the chairman of MKU, his brother, Neeraj Gupta, heads the international business team, while the third brother, Anurag Gupta, looks after the domestic operations. Neeraj Gupta is the managing director of MKU Limited. He started the armour business of the company.

== Technology ==
MKU has its centres of research & development in India and Germany that develop ballistic protection technologies for the company. Additionally it has its own In house Ballistic testing laboratory in Germany which can conduct ballistic testing up to STANAG Level IV including various other prevalent testing standards, globally. It recently launched a new technology which it terms as the 6th generation ballistic protection technology by the name "GEN-6" offering a substantial reduction in the weight and thickness of personal body armour by 40% and 30% respectively.

MKU's Mukut combat helmets are manufactured using its RHT (Reduced Helmet Trauma) technology which provides protection from bullets and fragments and reduces head and skull injuries. More importantly, it reduces the resultant trauma, arising due to BABT (Behind Armour Blunt Trauma), by over 40 per cent as compared to standard conventional composite helmets, according to the tests conducted by HP White Laboratory, USA.

== Business ==
=== Platform armouring ===
MKU designs, manufactures and supplies ballistic kits to global forces for their tracked and off-road vehicles across Armoured Combat Vehicles (ACVs) & Armoured Personnel Carriers (APCs). These kits can be installed on platforms in real time in combat zones depending on the mission criticality and combat requirements, and often include standalone armours or add on armours, and spall liners.

Spall liners protect the soldiers in APCs from spall effect arising due to penetration of hull by high speed projectiles like anti-material rifles. Such spall effect delivers multiple impacts on the occupants by injuries from fragments arising due to breach of vehicle hull from anti-material rounds.

=== Aircraft armouring ===
MKU has created armour panels for more than 20 types of helicopters including De Havilland DHC-6 Twin Otter, Pilatus PC-6 Turbo Porter, Bell UH-1/212 Huey-Types, Boeing CH-47, Eurocopter B0-105, Eurocopter Puma/Super Puma/Cougar, Sikorsky CH-53, Mil Mi-8/17, NH Industries NH-90. The company uses its German engineered patented system MODULARE SCHUTZ TECHNIK and Polyshield V6 technology to build up to 40 per cent lighter and thinner armour panels for different aircraft that protect the platform from small handguns, assault rifles, armour piercing ammunitions, fragments, and heavy machine guns. A reduced weight of the panels also translates into more useful payload and increases the endurance of the aircraft which means the pilot can have more crew and more ammunition or rations inside the aircraft. The products are in use on warships as well for, e.g., armouring German-built warships in Turkey.

=== Ballistic helmets ===
The Indian Army placed an order for 1,58,279 (158,279) ballistic helmets in December 2016 through capital route at the cost of ₹180 crore (US$26.79 million). The first batch of 7,500 helmets was delivered in June 2018. The Indian Navy would also receive 13,981 helmets. They would be used for counterterrorism along the Line of Control, counterinsurgency in the Northeast India as well as in UN peacekeeping missions by Indian personnel.

At the Aero India 2023, MKU unveiled a ballistic helmet made specifically for Sikhs serving in the military. The helmet is designated as the Kavro SCH 111 T ‘Veer' and reportedly offers protection from 9mm rounds.

In November 2023, the MKU showcased their Kavro Doma 360 at the Milipol Paris which is said to be the first combat helmet to be able to withstand high-calibre bullets. It can sustain 5 direct hits from an AK-47 rifle from a 10 m (33 ft) distance. It also provides 360° protection including from front, back, left, right or crown (top). The weight ranges from 1.55–1.90 kg (3.4–4.2 lb). The design was tested against 7.62×39mm mild steel core (MSC), M80 NATO BALL, and M193 rifle bullets. The technology was a result of 5 years of research & development.

=== Night vision device ===
The company had developed the Netro NW-3000 third generation night-vision, assault rifle-compatible (MIL-STD-1913) weapon sights. The sights have undergone trials for the Indian ministry of defence for 12 months across several terrains before selection and according to MKU, the sight can detect personnel at 500 m, recognise them at 300 m and identify them at 100 m. In case of platforms, the range stands at 600 m for detection, 400 m for recognition and 150 m for identification. MKU had received a ₹659.47 crore (equivalent to ₹681 crore or US$71 million in 2026) contract from the Indian Army to deliver 29,762 of these sights in October 2025. The first batch of 4,000 are planned to be delivered in the fiscal year of 2026.

== Exports ==
In January 2021, MKU won a contract to supply 14,500 ballistic vest to the Policia Militar do Estado de Sao Paulo of Brazil. The MKU also supply Night vision device to the Brazilian Army. They have reportedly exported over 30,000 helmets to the Philippine Army and police forces as per a report in October 2024.

MKU has supplied ballistic protection equipment to the military and police organisations of Philippines. A 2024 report stated that more than 30,000 helmets had been exported to customers in the Philippines.

In July 2025, MKU was reported to have secured a multi-year export contract to supply more than 200,000 ballistic helmets to an Asian armed force.

== Partnerships ==
- MKU has partnered with Thales Group of France in February 2020 to produce night vision devices in the country. The MoU was signed at the DefExpo2020 in Lucknow, Uttar Pradesh.
- In February 2026, MKU and Saudi Arabia-based company Sondos Advanced Industry announced the Tuwaiq Armour Industrial Corporation joint venture during the World Defense Show in Riyadh. The venture is intended to support local Saudi production of ballistic helmets, body armour and hard armour plates.
- In June 2026, MKU and Indonesia-based defence company PT Republikorp reached an agreement concerning localisation of electro-optical manufacturing in Indonesia. The proposed cooperation includes local manufacture of night-vision and related electro-optical equipment.
