= Deck Based Multi Role Helicopter =

Naval multi-role helicopter under development by HAL

General information
- Type: Naval multi-role helicopter
- National origin: India
- Manufacturer: Hindustan Aeronautics Limited
- Designer: Rotary Wing Research and Design Centre
- Status: Under development
- Primary user: Indian Navy

History
- Developed from: Indian Multi Role Helicopter

The Deck Based Multi Role Helicopter (DBMRH) is a 12.5-tonne class, twin-engine naval multi-role helicopter under development by Hindustan Aeronautics Limited (HAL) for the Indian Navy. Designed by HAL's Rotary Wing Research and Design Centre (RWRDC), the DBMRH is the specialized maritime variant of the Indian Multi Role Helicopter (IMRH).

== Development ==
=== Origins ===
The DBMRH program was conceptualized alongside the Indian Multi Role Helicopter (IMRH) initiative to replace older medium-lift rotorcraft across the Indian Armed Forces, including aging Westland Sea King helicopters in service with the Indian Navy.

While the land-based IMRH variant for the Indian Air Force and Indian Army is designed as a 13-tonne class transport and assault rotorcraft, configuration studies for the naval DBMRH established a 12.5-tonne MTOW specification tailored for shipboard storage and deck operations.

=== Propulsion development ===
In August 2024, HAL signed an airframer contract with SAFHAL Helicopter Engines Pvt. Ltd., a joint venture between HAL and Safran Helicopter Engines to co-develop a new high-power turboshaft engine named "Aravalli". The engine, based on Safran's Aneto architecture, is planned to deliver output between 2,200 kW and 3,000 kW (3,000–4,000 shp) to power both the land-based IMRH and the naval DBMRH.

== Design ==
The DBMRH features structural and system adaptations required for maritime operations and integration with aircraft carriers, destroyers, and frigates.

== See also ==
- Indian Multi Role Helicopter
- HAL Dhruv
- HAL Prachand
- Sikorsky SH-60 Seahawk
- NHIndustries NH90
