= Indian Multi Role Helicopter =

Medium-lift helicopter for the Indian Armed Forces

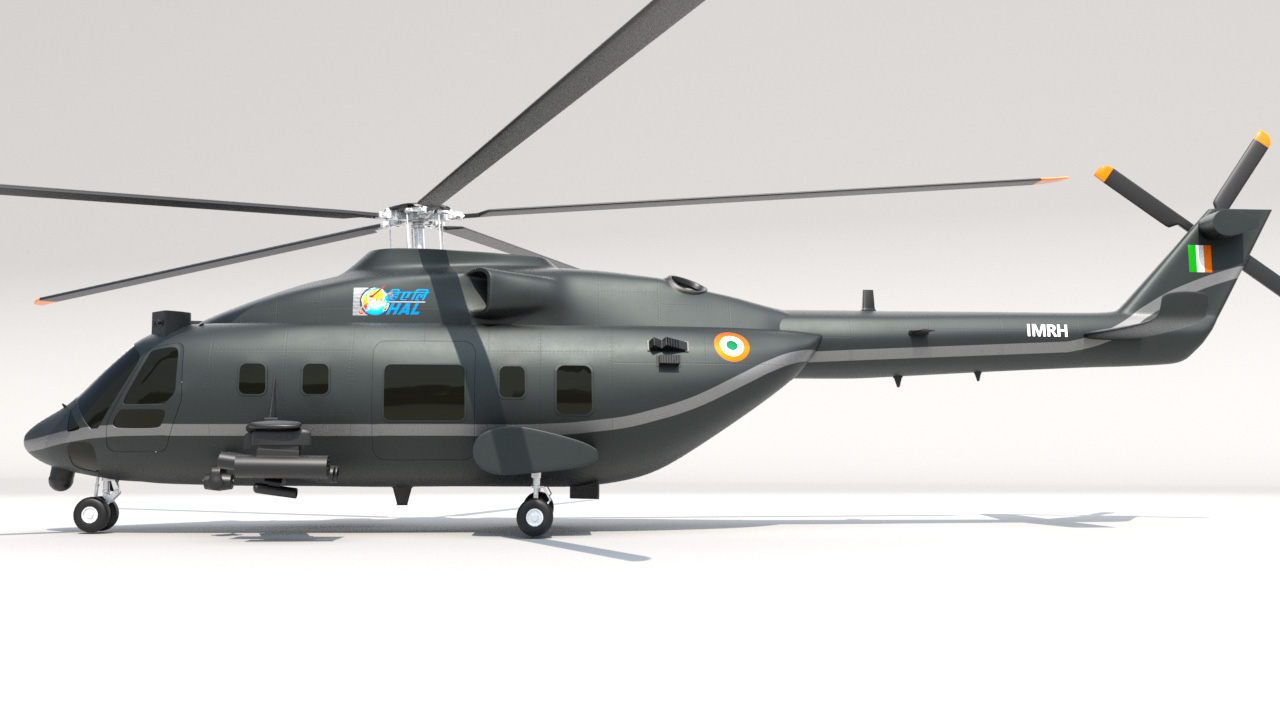

General information
- Type: Multirole helicopter
- National origin: India
- Manufacturer: Hindustan Aeronautics Limited
- Designer: Rotary Wing Research and Design Center
- Status: Under development
- Primary user: Indian Armed Forces

History
- Introduction date: 2036-2037 (expected)
- First flight: 2030-2031 (Planned)

The Indian Multi Role Helicopter (IMRH) is a medium-lift helicopter currently under development by Hindustan Aeronautics Limited (HAL) for the Indian Armed Forces. It is designed for multiple roles, air assault, air-attack, anti-submarine, anti-surface, military transport and VIP transport roles. IMRH/DBMRH is aimed to replace all the current Mil Mi-17 helicopters across the Indian Armed Forces.

The helicopter will also have a parallel naval variant designated as the Deck Based Multi Role Helicopter.

The planned rotorcraft is expected to have a maximum takeoff weight of 13 tonnes with a five bladed articulated main rotor and 4 bladed articulated rotor on tail. The navalised version further will have longer range and higher payload capacity. HAL estimates requirement of over 314 rotorcraft of same class across the Indian Armed Forces to replace existing Mil Mi-17 helicopters in service in India.

The scaled model tests of the helicopter have been ongoing as of 2021 while first flight of a full prototype is expected in 2025–26. The introduction into the armed forces thereafter is expected in 2028, after two years of testing. A total of six prototypes are planned for trials before production.

== Development ==
=== Origins ===
During the late 2000s, Indian aerospace manufacturer Hindustan Aeronautics Limited (HAL), which was interested in expanding their rotorcraft offering beyond that of the existing HAL Dhruv programme, began to explore the potential for the production of a conceptual 10-tonne class helicopter; this concept came to be known as the Medium Lift Helicopter (MLH). If produced, the 10-tonne MLH shall hold the distinction of being the largest rotary-wing aircraft to have ever been produced by India. Early on, it was recognised that the type would be primarily marketed towards military customers, especially the Indian armed forces, and that the tentative programme would greatly benefit from the involvement of a foreign manufacturer in a partnership arrangement.

Speaking in September 2008 on the company's ambitions for the MLH, HAL Chairman Ashok Baweja stated: "We plan to develop and build 10-tonne class helicopters in partnership with either the Eurocopter or the Russians... This would be a joint venture between the selected company and HAL". At this point, there were public estimates of producing around 350 helicopters in the 10-tonne class, which was dependent upon the military market for medium-lift helicopters. HAL were also keen to explore the potential for export sales of the MLH, the prospects of which being recognised to greatly depend upon the foreign partner select to participate in the programme. He also stated that HAL intends to offer the 10-tonne MLH to the Indian Navy for the purpose of meeting its established requirement for a fleet of heavy-lift helicopters.

During the late 2000s, HAL issued a formal invitation for bids from major rotorcraft manufacturers across the world to co-develop the MLH. However, during July 2009, HAL reportedly cancelled its active tender for the helicopter's co-development; by this stage, both Eurocopter and Mil Helicopters had been shortlisted as potential technology and investment partners. Allegedly, HAL informed the two companies that the tender had been scrapped because of the qualitative requirements of the armed forces having substantially changed. Speaking at a national seminar held in December 2014, HAL's chief test pilot, Wing Commander Unnikrishna Pillai, gave a talk on the design challenges posed development of medium and heavy lift helicopters in India. He said that, following on from the expertise gained in earlier projects, the Rotary Wing Research and Design Centre (RWR&DC) of HAL has become confident and is well poised to develop medium lift helicopters.

=== Relaunch ===
On 15 February 2017, HAL re-launched its MLH proposal as the Indian Multi-Role Helicopter (IMRH) programme with an aim to design and develop a 12-tonne, twin-engine multipurpose helicopter for the Indian Armed Forces, the civilian market as well as for export customers. During Aero India, the then defence minister, Manohar Parrikar, unveiled a full sized mock-up of the IMRH. As per HAL, IMRH would have double the payload capacity of the in-service Advanced Light Helicopter. The IMRH proposal would require clearance from the HAL board before the formal designing procedure could commence and the project was in the proof of concept stage only. The mock-up at the Aero India was largely based on the Mi-17, which the IMRH Is meant to replace. Four variants of the helicopter was expected, including three for the three branches of the Armed Forces and a civilian version. HAL expects the Indian Army to have a demand of 400 helicopters of the same category.

The helicopter was expected to have a flight ceiling of up to 20,000 feet while transporting a maximum of 24 personnel or a payload of 3,500 kg. A naval variant was also planned. The helicopter could serve multiple roles including troop transport, combat search and rescue, VVIP transport, ground and offshore operations, air ambulance, casualty evacuation, and carrying under-slung loads. It would feature automatic flight control system, mission systems and advanced cockpit displays. Though HAL planned the first flight of the aircraft by 2018–19, the engine was yet to be selected. The first flight would be followed by trials and customer acceptance with an expected timeframe of seven to eight years.

During May 2017, HAL issued requests for information (RFIs) in regards to elements of the Indian Multi-Role Helicopter (IMRH); the requests involved the turboshaft engines, along with assistance in the development of a blade-folding mechanism and external reviews of the rotorcraft's landing gear and transmission. The landing gear is planned to be retractable and use an active steering system and self-centering capability, while the engines are to be imported, equipped with dual-channel full authority digital electronic controls (FADEC) and be capable of above-average high-altitude performance. Both the main and tail rotors are to be made of composite materials and are to be coated with radar absorbent/infrared resistant paints. HAL was expecting the first prototype to be rolled out by 2020.

On 5 August 2019, it was reported that the project would require would have a budget of ₹10,000 crore (US$1.42 billion). The process for securing government approvals for budget allocation had begun. It would be followed by design and development of prototypes, while the first flight would take place in two years. The requirement for such helicopters is reportedly of around 550 units.

As of March 2021, the scale models have been undergoing trials, the flight of a full-sized prototype is expected in 2025-2026 ahead of the type's intended induction into the armed forces. The prototype programme is expected to involve six prototypes and have a total budget of ₹10,000 crore (US$1.0 billion). A specialised version for the Indian Navy will further be developed with greater range, a higher payload capacity and furnishings for maritime operations. Till 30 March 2022, HAL completed preliminary design work and is ready for prototype development.

In July 2021, the Indian Navy formally involved itself in the project, envisaging a navalised version of the helicopter for anti-submarine and anti-surface warfare roles. As the naval variant will not perform high-altitude operations, unlike Indian Army and Indian Air Force operations, it will have higher payload capacity and longer range. It is anticipated that the navalised version will have dedicated equipment for the role, including sonar and sea-scanner radar with a customised cockpit.

As per reports in July 2022, IMRH will be the first major project to follow new manufacturing policy under Defence Acquisition Procedure (DAP) 2020. As per the policy, a private sector entity will form Special Purpose Vehicle (SPV) with HAL by acquiring 51% stake after getting minimum order assurance from Indian Armed Forces. During delivery, the company will be free to export 25% of the production to a third country. An estimated ₹11,000 crore will be required as development cost for seven years and another ₹12,000 crore for setting up manufacturing facilities. The total requirement of the Indian Armed Forces is 550 units.

As per the information on the official website of HAL, as of July 2025, the preliminary design of the IMRH programme and configuration studies for the DBMRH are underway and nearing completion. Based on an estimated need for 419 helicopters for tri-services, including 66 deck-based versions for the Indian Navy, HAL invested ₹4,000 crore (US$420 million) in May 2025 for the development and construction of IMRH.

As of July 2025, a report claimed that HAL has prepared a note for Cabinet Committee on Security (CCS) to seek its clearance for the project worth ₹13,000 crore (equivalent to ₹130 billion or US$1.4 billion in 2026). The project involved the construction of five prototypes including one or more of the naval variant. While 30% of the funds will be acquired internally by HAL, the rest of 70% will be sought from the Government of India. With the CCS clearance, the project will enter the execution phase. By then, the plans for an SPV model was scrapped since no private sector companies showed interested. The move was also cleared by the Government.

The first prototype of the IMRH is anticipated to fly in 2027–28, and manufacturing is scheduled to start in 2030-31.

On 2 September 2026, CNBC TV18 reported that the CCS could give the approval for the first phase of the project, including the design and development of the helicopter. The allocation of the ₹13,500 crore (equivalent to ₹140 billion or US$1.4 billion in 2026) budget has been cleared by the costing committee. The helicopter will reportedly have an indigenous content of 75%.

=== Production ===
The primary facility for the helicopter's serial production was established in the Tumakuru district. A plaque for the foundation stone was unveiled by the Prime Minister of India, Narendra Modi, on 3 January 2016. The initial investment amounted to ₹2,000 crore (US$297.64 million) with an annual production capacity of 30 helicopters from 2019–20. The rate would be later enhanced to 60 units in a four-year long phase II development. While the HAL Helicopter Factory was originally meant for production of the HAL Light Utility Helicopter (LUH), the facility's portfolio will be further expanded to include the Light Combat Helicopter (LCH) and the Indian Multi Role Helicopter (IMRH). The facility will also handle the maintenance, repair and overhaul (MRO) of the Civil ALH, LCH, LUH. The 615 acres (2.49 km^{2}) factory, reportedly the largest in India, was inaugirated on 6 February 2023 by Narendra Modi. Another third phase expansion was planned to deliver 90 helicopters, in the 3–15 tonne class, annually.

== Design ==
In 2021, details on progress were unveiled in Aero India. The helicopter is expected to have a maximum take off weight of 13 tonnes and will have 24 to 36 crews on board in various configurations. The helicopter will have a five bladed main rotor with a diameter of 21.2 metres (70 ft) and a four-blade tail rotor. The MLH will have 75% domestic content but will use an imported 2000 kW turboshaft engine. Payload capacity at sea level will be 4 tonnes and 1.5 tonne at an altitude of 13,000 ft (4,000 m). Aircraft will have pair of weapons wings which will provide four hardpoints for up to 1,600 kilograms (3,500 lb) of armaments. The aircraft passed preliminary design phase in 2021 and expects approval for further development by late 2021 or early 2022. First flight is expected 4 years after development project began while the introduction is scheduled for 2028.

=== Engine ===
HAL started discussions with Safran Helicopter Engines, a French engine manufacturing company, for joint development and manufacturing of the IMRH engine under a strategic partnership model. On 8 July 2022, HAL signed memorandum of understanding (MoU) with Safran Helicopter Engines to form a joint venture company that will be dedicated to the development, production, sales and support of the new generation helicopter engine for IMRH, including the naval variant. The company will also fulfil the requirements of future helicopter projects undertaken by HAL and the Ministry of Defence. HAL will hold the type certificate for the engine after development is complete, which will take three years. On 15 February 2023, HAL and Safran signed work share agreement for joint development of engine. In November 2023, HAL and Safran established the joint venture business, SAFHAL Helicopter Engines, for a new generation helicopter engine. On 29 December 2023, Defence Secretary Giridhar Aramane established a new design and testing facility at the HAL Aero Engine Research and Development Centre (AERDC) in Bengaluru. The AERDC would be responsible for the engine developed for IMRH and DBMRH under the JV firm.

In July 2024, it was reported that ANETO–1H (Hindustan variant) will be used to power the prototypes of IMRH. A contract will be signed for 12 such engines for 6 prototypes. The engines are to be delivered within a timeline of 24th to 36th month of the signing of contract. The engines will be delivered to HAL's Rotary Wing Research and Design Centre (RWRDC).

On 30 August 2024, HAL partnered with SAFHAL to develop the HAL Aravalli engines for 13 tonne IMRH and 12.5 tonne DBMRH (maritime variant) helicopters. The engine is named after Aravalli Range of mountains in Western India. The contract was signed by S Anbuvelan, CEO (Helicopter Complex), HAL and Olivier Savin, Director, SAFHAL Helicopter Engines and EVP, Sales and Marketing, Safran Helicopter Engines and SK Mehta, Director, SAFHAL Helicopter Engines and Executive Director (Finance), HAL. After the contract is signed, HAL anticipates that the engine development will take at least 48 months, and the project would probably take 60 months to complete.

Up to ₹6,000 crore (US$620 million) would be spent on the engine's development. It is anticipated that the first engine will leave the assembly line in 2029. A thorough certification process will then be conducted to make sure the engine is compatible with the IMRH platform for testing and further production.

On 26 August 2026, the final contract was signed. It covered the design, development, manufacturing, supply, and lifecycle support of the 3,500–4,000 shaft horsepower (shp) class Aravalli engine.

== Operational history ==
HAL has commented that the company has been examining the prospects of the indigenously developed-MLH essentially replacing the Mi-17 helicopters that are in widespread use both abroad and in India, especially by its heavy use by most frontline operations by the Indian Air Force; possessing broadly specifications, the fledgling rotorcraft is to be capable of performing a greater number of roles than the Russian Mi-17. While there has been no officially-stated requirement for a 10-12 tonne rotorcraft; however, the company has intentions for the IMRH to ultimately start replacing India's older Mi-17s after 2025.

== Variants ==
- IMRH (Indian Multi Role Helicopter): Base variant for Indian Army and Indian Air Force. Maximum take off of 13 tonnes (13 long tons; 14 short tons).
- DBMRH (Deck Based Multi Role Helicopter): Indian Navy variant. Maximum take-off weight of 12.5 tonnes (12.3 long tons; 13.8 short tons). Optimized for naval operations (anti-submarine and anti-surface warfare roles) with higher payload and extended range.

== Specifications (projected) ==
Data from Display at Aero India 2021

General characteristics

- Crew: 2
- Capacity: 24 to 36 seated troops / 4,500 kg (9,921 lb)
- Length: 25.16 m (82 ft 7 in)
- Height: 6.22 m (20 ft 5 in)
- Max takeoff weight: 13,000 kg (28,660 lb)
- Powerplant: 2 × SAFHAL Aravalli turboshaft engines, 2,237–2,983 kW (3,500–4,000 shp) each
- Main rotor diameter: 21.2 m (69 ft 7 in)

Performance

- Maximum speed: 300 km/h (190 mph, 160 kn)
- Cruise speed: 260 km/h (160 mph, 140 kn)
- Range: 800 km (500 mi, 430 nmi)
- Service ceiling: 6,700 m (22,000 ft)

Armament

- 2x wings with four hardpoints for a maximum payload of 1,600 kg (3,500 lb).
  Each inboard station and outboard station has a capacity of 500 kg (1,100 lb) and 300 kg (660 lb) respectively.

== See also ==
Related development

- HAL Dhruv
- HAL Light Utility Helicopter
- HAL Prachand

Aircraft of comparable role, configuration, and era

- AgustaWestland AW101
- Eurocopter EC725
- NHIndustries NH90
- Mil Mi-38
- Mil Mi-17
- Sikorsky S-92
- Changhe Z-18
