= Jodhpur Airport =

Airport in Jodhpur, India

- IATA: JDH; ICAO: VIJO

Summary
- Airport type: Military/Public
- Operator: Airports Authority of India
- Serves: Jodhpur
- Location: Jodhpur, Rajasthan, India
- Elevation AMSL: 216 m (709 ft)
- Coordinates: 26°15′26″N 073°03′06″E
- Website: Jodhpur Airport

Map
- Location within Rajasthan Location within India

Runways
Direction	Length		Surface
Direction	m	ft	Surface
05/23	2,744	9,002	Concrete/Asphalt

Statistics (April 2025 - March 2026)
- Passengers: 10,90,554 (▲4.7%)
- Aircraft movements: 7,770 (▼4.9%)
- Cargo tonnage: 192.9 (▲42.3%)
- Source: AAI

Jodhpur Airport (IATA: JDH, ICAO: VIJO) is a domestic airport and an Indian Air Force base serving the city of Jodhpur, Rajasthan, India. It is operated by the Airports Authority of India (AAI) and shares its airside with the Jodhpur Air Force Station of the Indian Air Force.

It is the 48th-busiest airport in India, handling more than 1 million passengers in FY 2025–2026. In July 2026, a new, larger terminal was inaugurated to meet rising traffic, beside the existing terminal.

== History ==
=== Jodhpur State and flying club ===
In 1924, Maharaja Umaid Singh of Jodhpur cleared a landing strip near the under-construction Chittar Palace (later known as the Umaid Bhawan Palace) for private operations. In 1931, the Maharaja established the Jodhpur Flying Club, the first in an Indian princely state, appointing Geoffrey Goodwin of Johannesburg, South Africa, as the club's first flight instructor. The club's initial aircraft complement consisted of two De Havilland DH.60 Moth aircraft purchased from the Delhi Flying Club. In 1932, the club became the first institution in India to induct the De Havilland Tiger Moth trainer biplane. The aerodrome at Jodhpur was erected at a cost of 136,830 rupees.

Maharaja Umaid Singh used this infrastructure for regional aviation diplomacy, establishing the airfield as an international transit hub to assert state sovereignty amidst shifting colonial regulations. Jodhpur served as an important staging post on the Karachi to Calcutta sector, a route co-operated by Imperial Airways and Indian Trans-Continental Airways. The airfield also served routes connecting Europe to South East Asia and Australia. Air Orient and later Air France used the airfield for its services connecting Paris to Saigon, Hanoi, and Hong Kong, while KLM utilized Jodhpur on its regular Amsterdam to Batavia route. By 1937 the aerodrome handled 877 aircraft annually.

=== World War II ===
Following the outbreak of World War II, Maharaja Umaid Singh placed the state's extensive airfield network at the disposal of the war effort to secure political leverage. The Maharaja was later granted an honorary commission in the Royal Air Force, eventually attaining the rank of Air Vice-Marshal.

On 1 May 1942, the airfield and club were requisitioned as a military training centre with the formation of the No. 2 Elementary Flying Training School. The base was used as a maintenance and staging post by the RAF and later by the United States Army Air Forces as a transit airfield for "Hump" supply flights across the China-Burma-India theatre.

=== Indian Air Force ===
The airfield was upgraded in 1950 after the formation of the Royal Indian Air Force (which later became the Indian Air Force). From 1949 to 1955, the Indian Air Force maintained the No. 2 Air Force Academy at Jodhpur, and later from 1957 to 1970, it served as the Air Force Flying College.

=== New terminal ===
Inside View of Terminal

The Government of Rajasthan signed a memorandum of understanding with the Indian Air Force for the expansion of the passenger terminal in March 2017, wherein 37 acres of IAF land was transferred to the Airports Authority of India (AAI). In May 2021, the land was transferred by the IAF to the AAI through the Jodhpur Development Authority. The terminal's foundation stone was laid by Prime Minister Narendra Modi in October 2023.

The 23,342 square metre terminal was inaugurated on 4 July 2026 by Prime Minister Narendra Modi, where he also launched the modified UDAN Scheme to expand regional infrastructure. The terminal incorporates Rajput architecture including arches and jharokhas. Developed at a cost of ₹480 crore (US$51 million), the terminal was designed by the Indian architectural firm STHAPATI and built to target GRIHA certification. The terminal scales the airport's operational capacity to 2 million annual passengers.

== Structure ==
The airport's 12-acre civil enclave contains a terminal building measuring a built-up area of 5,690 m^{2}, which is capable of handling 430 passengers per hour. The terminal has seven check-in counters and three boarding gates. The adjoining concrete apron measures 140 by 100 metres and has three parking bays that can cater to two Airbus A320 and Boeing 737 type aircraft simultaneously.

The runway is 2,743 metres long and 45 metres wide. The airfield is equipped with night landing facilities and an Instrument Landing System (ILS) as well as navigational facilities like DVOR/DME and an NDB. The runway was resurfaced in April 2026.

== Jodhpur Air Force Station ==
Squadrons of HAL Dhruv, HAL Prachand, HAL Chetak, Mil Mi-17 and Sukhoi Su-30MKI aircraft are based here. It was active during the Kargil War of 1999. There is also a battalion of the Garud Commando Force here.

On 3 October 2022, IAF inducted HAL Prachand into 143 Helicopter Unit at Jodhpur Air Force Station.

== Airlines and destinations ==
Airlines	Destinations
Air India	Delhi, Mumbai
Air India Express	Bengaluru, Delhi, Mumbai
IndiGo	Ahmedabad, Bengaluru, Delhi, Hyderabad, Mumbai, Noida, Pune

== See also ==
- Airports in India
- List of busiest airports in India by passenger traffic
