= HAL Aravalli =

Indian Helicopter engine under development

Aravalli
- Type: Turboshaft
- National origin: India; France
- Manufacturer: Hindustan Aeronautics Limited
- Built by: SAFHAL
- Major applications: HAL IMRH; HAL DBMRH
- Status: Under detailed design phase

The HAL Aravalli is a turboshaft engine under development by India's Hindustan Aeronautics Limited (HAL) in collaboration with France's SAFRAN. It is named after the Aravalli mountain ranges in Western India.

== History ==
HAL and SAFRAN signed a contract in November 2023 to create a 50:50 joint-venture called SAFHAL to develop the Aravalli engine that will be used to power future Indian medium lift helicopters such as the HAL IMRH and HAL DBMRH. The engine is beign created for Helicopters in the 13-tonne class. A final development and production contract was signed in August 2026. The Aravalli programme is the first high-power helicopter engine to be designed and manufactured in India. It will be produced at HAL's facility in Tumkur, Karnataka. It is hoped that the entire design and development phase for the engine be completed by 2033, pending which it would be commissioned into service with the IMRH helicopter.

== Design ==
The Aravalli engine is being designed as a 3,500 to 4,000 shp turboshaft engine. HAL seeks design aid from SAFRAN for core engine technologies, such as a high-pressure compressor, power turbine, fuel and oil system components, accessory gearbox and some external engine systems. Beyond its Military application, SAFHAL intents to market the engine to commercial

== See Also ==
- GE T700
- HAL HTSE-1200
