= No. 143 Helicopter Unit, IAF =

No. 143 Helicopter Unit
- Active: 1 June 2022 - Present
- Country: Republic of India
- Branch: Indian Air Force
- Garrison/HQ: Jodhpur AFS
- Nickname(s): "Dhanush"

Aircraft flown
- Attack: HAL Prachand

No. 143 Helicopter Unit (Dhanush) is a helicopter unit of the Indian Air Force and is equipped with HAL Prachand based at Jodhpur AFS.

== History ==
143 Helicopter Unit, is the latest attack helicopter unit of the Indian Air Force. It is the first unit to be equipped with the indigenously developed HAL Prachand attack helicopter. The unit was raised on 1 June 2022 and started receiving the initial lot of helicopters from 18 July, 2022. The unit officially inducted 4 HAL Prachand on 3 October, 2022.

== Assignments ==
The unit will be tasked to carry out mainly ground attack missions. Prachand also has limited aerial combat capability. Armed with M621 cannon on Nexter THL-20 turret, ATAM, FZ275 LGR rockets and Dhruvastra anti-tank guided missiles, the helicopter is well versed in carrying out varied operations duties.

=== Aircraft ===
Aircraft	From	To	Air Base
HAL Prachand	3 October 2022	Present	Jodhpur AFS

== Gallery ==
Helicopter Unit 143 ceremony pics
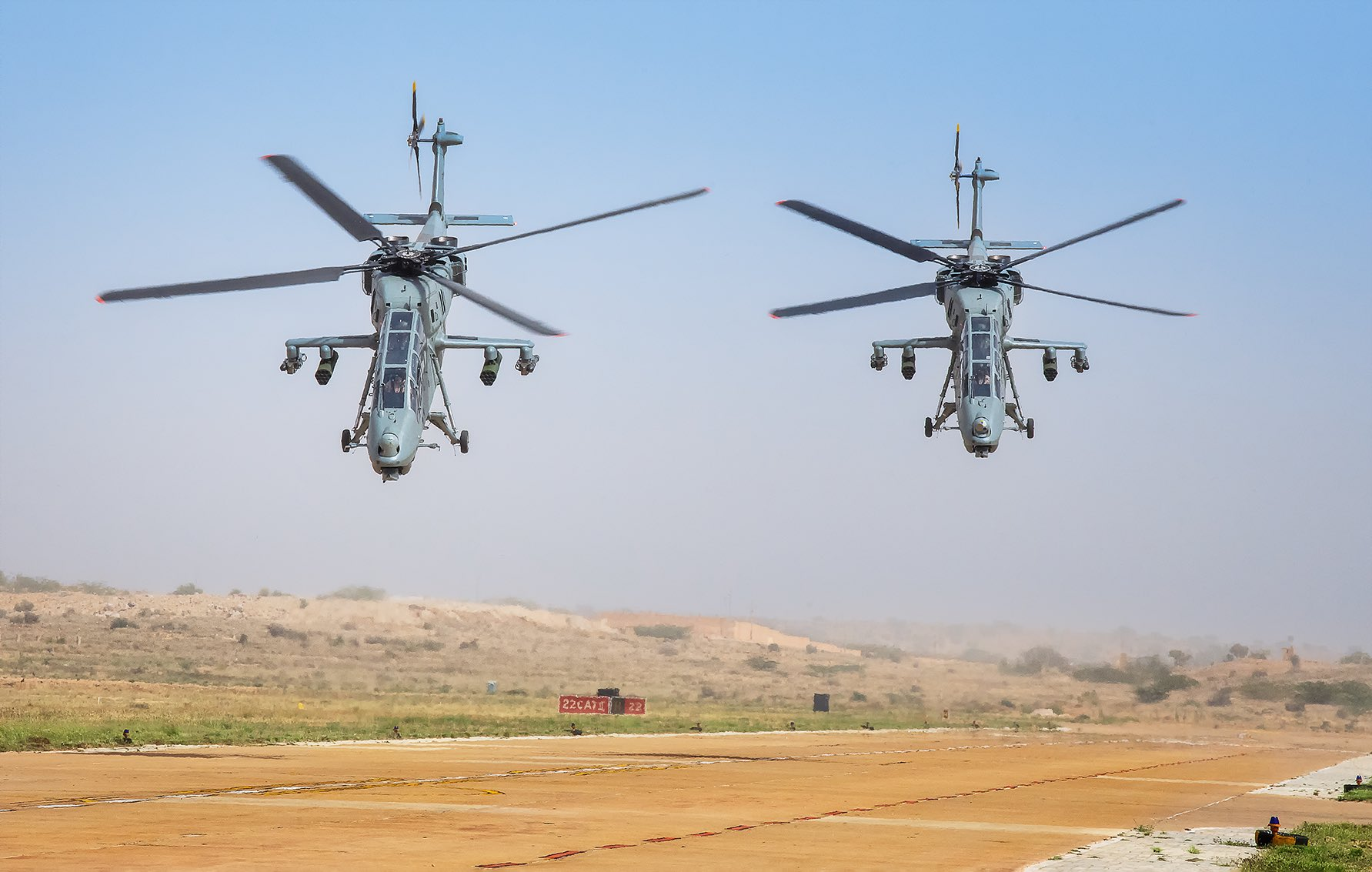

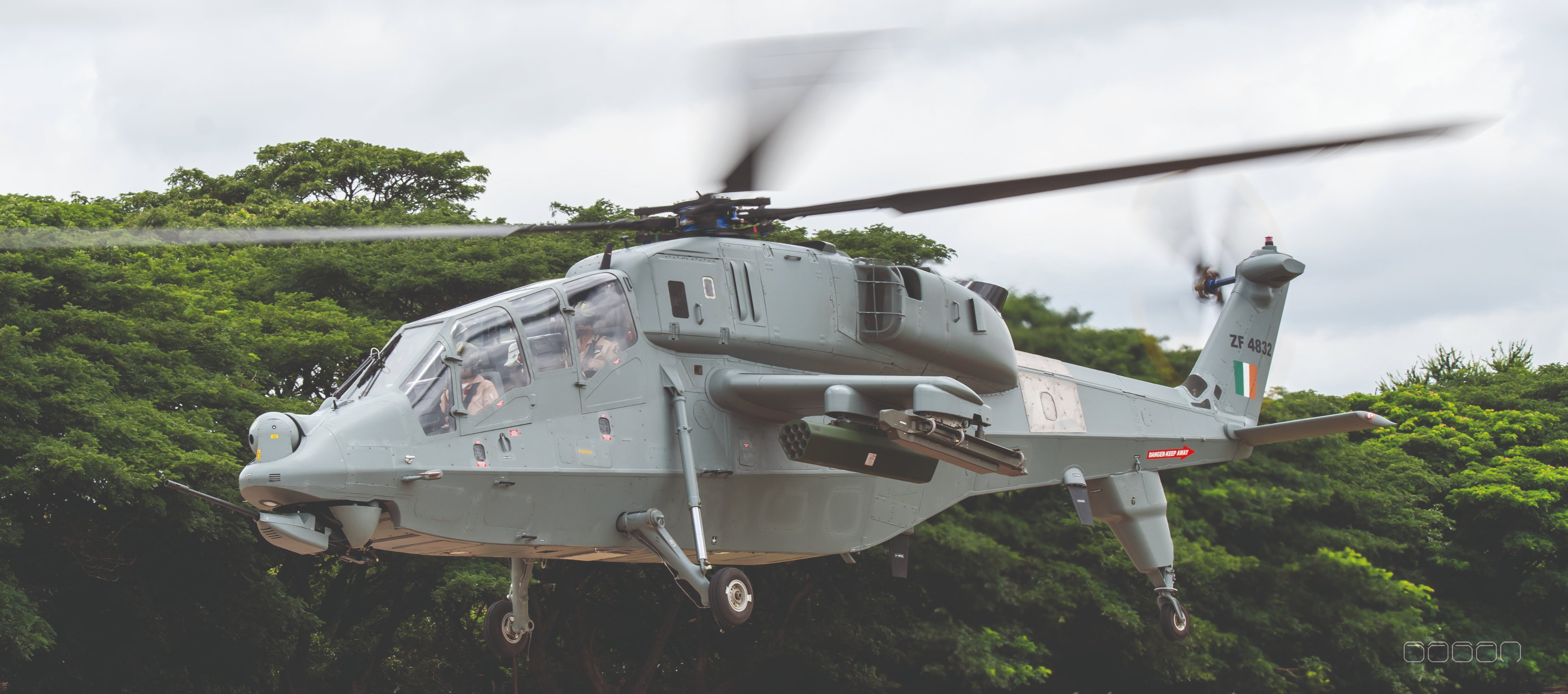

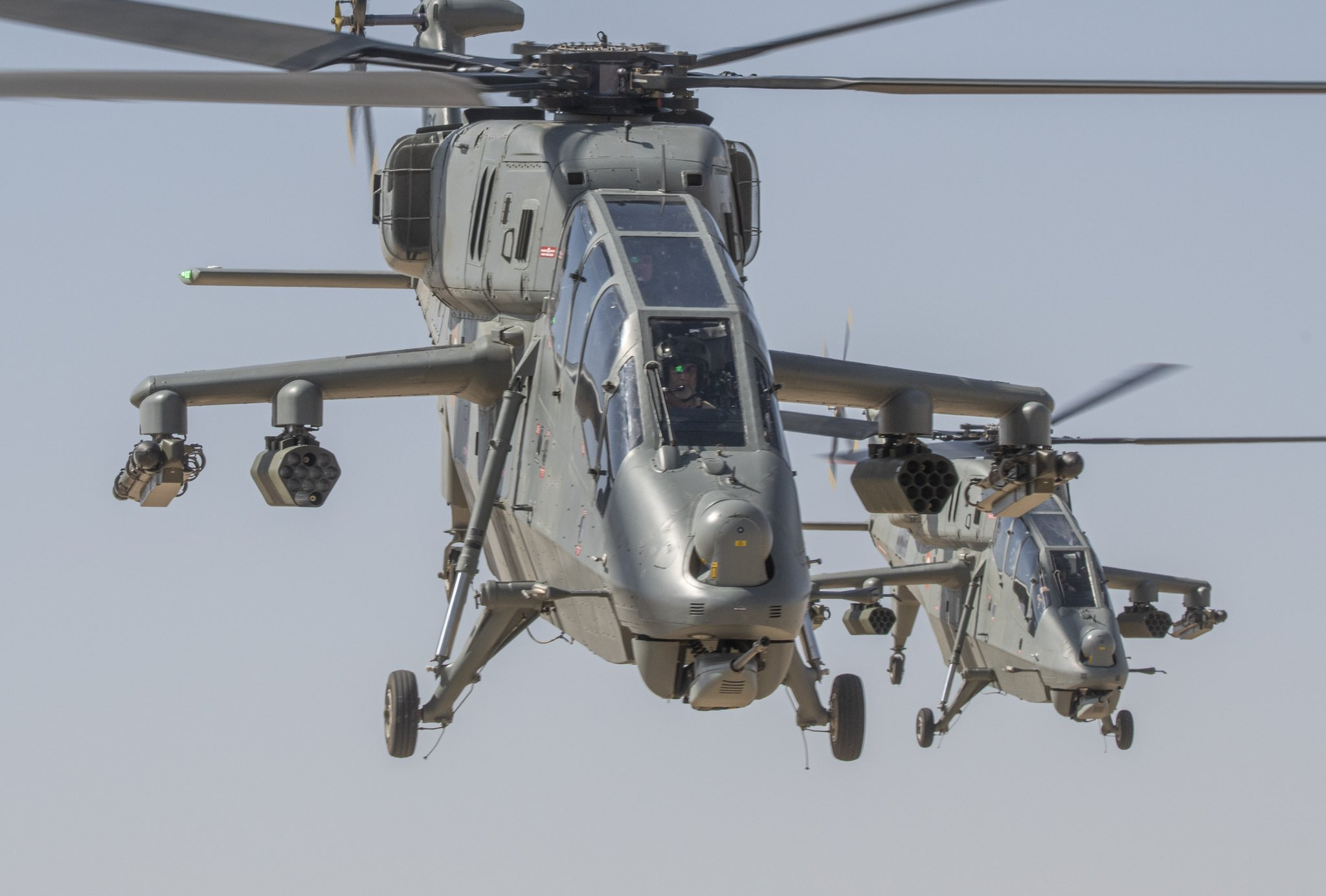
