= HAL Prachand =

Indian Light Combat Helicopter

Prachand
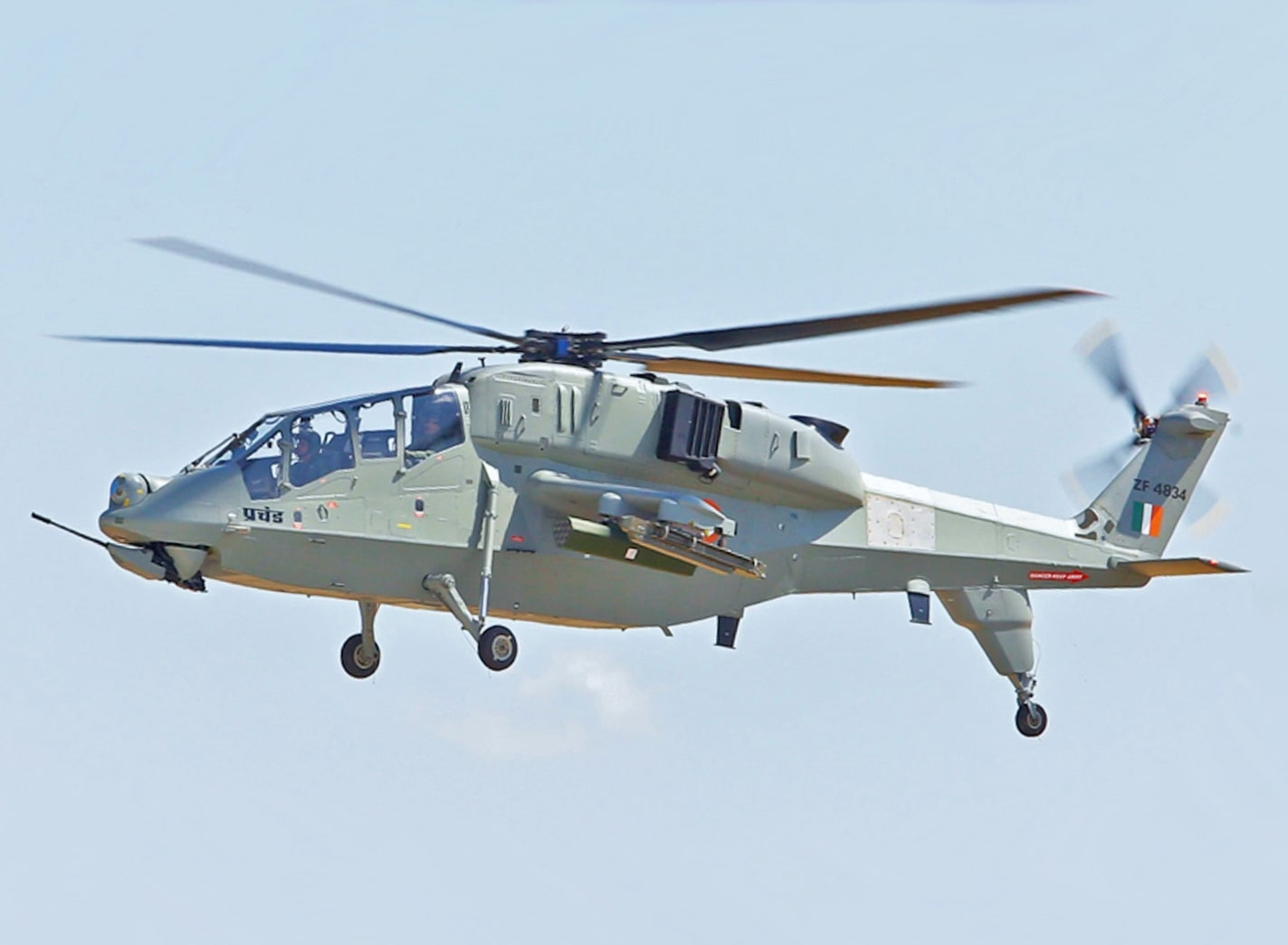
- A HAL Prachand of No. 143 Helicopter Unit, IAF

General information
- Type: Attack helicopter
- National origin: India
- Manufacturer: Hindustan Aeronautics Limited
- Designer: Rotary Wing Research and Design Centre
- Status: In service 156 on order
- Primary users: Indian Army Indian Air Force
- Number built: 19 (4 TD, 15 LSP)

History
- Manufactured: 2017 – present
- Introduction date: 3 October 2022
- First flight: 29 March 2010
- Developed from: HAL Dhruv

The HAL Prachand (lit. 'Fierce/Intense') is an Indian multi-role light attack helicopter designed and manufactured by Hindustan Aeronautics Limited (HAL) under Project Light Combat Helicopter (LCH). It has been ordered by the Indian Air Force (IAF) and the Indian Army's Aviation Corps (AAC). On 3 October 2022, the LCH was formally inducted into the IAF and was officially named "Prachand".

The impetus for the development of the LCH Prachand came in the form of the Kargil War, a conflict fought between India and neighbouring Pakistan in 1999, which revealed the Indian Armed Forces lacked a suitable armed rotorcraft capable of operating unrestricted in the high-altitude theatre. During 2006, the company announced that it had launched a development programme to produce such a rotorcraft, referred to simply as the LCH or Light Combat Helicopter. Originally, the LCH was anticipated to attain initial operating capability (IOC) by December 2010. However, development of the type was protracted and subject to several delays, some of which having been attributed to suppliers.

The LCH Prachand draws extensively on an earlier indigenous helicopter developed and manufactured by HAL, the HAL Dhruv; using this rotorcraft as a starting point has been attributed as significantly reducing the cost of the programme.

== Development ==
=== Origins ===
HAL Prachand of the Indian Air Force

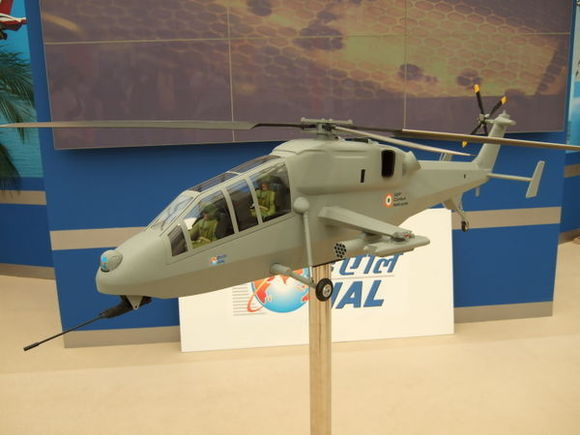
LCH model on display at ILA Berlin Air Show 2008

During the late 1990s, India and neighbouring nation Pakistan engaged in a brief but intensely-fought conflict commonly known as the Kargil War. This war, in which various elements of the Indian military were deployed, revealed operational shortcomings and areas for improvement, particularly the requirement for an attack helicopter that would be suitable for use within the high altitude climates in which some combat operations were fought along the north-western border region. Accordingly, there was considerable interest in not only the acquisition of a suitable contemporary rotorcraft for the task (as well as to replace several aging types in Indian military service, such as the Mil Mi 24s, Cheetah and Chetak), but for such an aircraft to be domestically developed and manufactured in India as well.

During early 2004, Indian aerospace manufacturer Hindustan Aeronautics Limited (HAL) declared that the company was in the midst of discussions with the Indian armed forces on the prospects for a potential light combat helicopter derivative of the company's existing Dhruv utility helicopter platform for the requirement. During late 2004, the Indian armed forces decided to curtail plans to order foreign-built attack helicopters in anticipation of a decision to formally select the tentative LCH. During 2006, HAL publicly announced that it had embarked upon the development of such an attack helicopter, which it referred to as the Light Combat Helicopter (LCH). During late 2006, the Indian government decided to aid the fledgling programme via the issuing of external finance to support the design phase of the LCH's development, this was done as to aid the attack helicopter in conforming with the established requirements of the Indian Army and the Indian Air Force. Accordingly, both HAL and the Indian Armed Forces commenced exploratory efforts towards the conceptualisation of a combat helicopter to perform in this role.

Development of the LCH did not progress to schedule. On 21 June 2007, HAL chairman Ashok Baweja announced that and stated that the first prototype LCH was to conduct its maiden flight during October 2008, and stated that the company was currently "halfway through the design stage". During November 2008, the company declared that, while the first flight had been postponed until March 2009, it was still working to secure initial operating capability (IOC) for the LCH by December 2010, while it was still anticipated that the type would receive its Final Operational Clearance (FOC) during 2011. During February 2009, Baweja announced another six-month delay to the development timetable, he also attributed some of the setbacks in the programme as having been a result of HAL's suppliers failing to deliver necessary tooling on time.

=== Prototype and testing ===
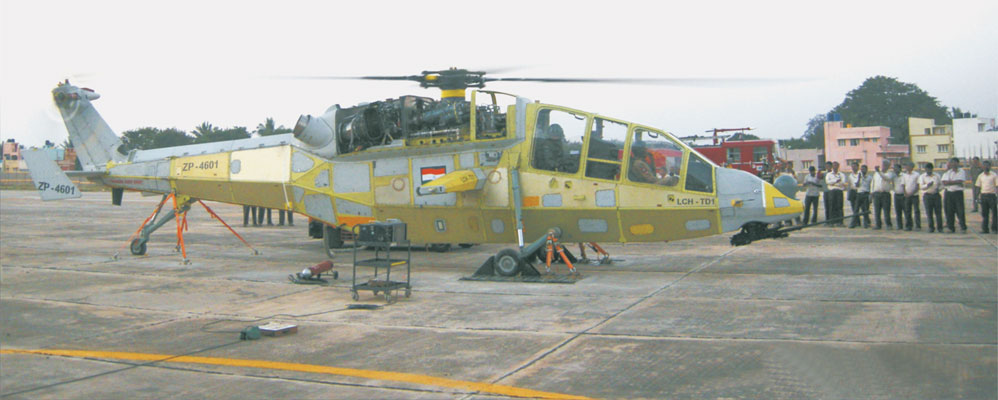
LCH prototype undergoing engine start at HAL on 5 April 2010

During late January 2010, HAL stated that the LCH had successfully completed initial ground tests and was now ready to fly; the first flight was anticipated to occur during February. On 4 February 2010, the first LCH prototype completed its first powered ground run. On 29 March 2010, the maiden flight of the LCH was conducted by the type's first LCH Technology Demonstrator (TD-1). It flew a 20-minute flight from HAL's Helicopter Complex at Bengaluru, during which the rotorcraft carried out low speed, low altitude checks on the systems on board. Following the completion of the flight, the crew reported that the performance of the helicopter and systems were satisfactory.An extensive test programme, involving a total of four prototypes, was conducted. During the course of these tests, the LCH gained the distinction of being the first attack helicopter to land in Siachen, having repeatedly landed at several high altitude helipads, some of which being as high as 13,600 to 15,800 feet (4,100 to 4,800 meters). .

On 23 May 2010, following the successful completion of the third test flight of the LCH prototype, it was deemed to have fulfilled the desired parameters, thus enabling further armed tests to proceed. The second LCH prototype (TD-2) differed considerably from its predecessor, as it was fitted with armaments and featured a substantial reduction in weight. It was publicly unveiled at Aero India 2011 in February 2011. Speaking at the event, HAL stated that the program had exceeded the human and payload requirements mandated by the IAF for its development. On 28 June 2011, TD-2 performed its first flight, allowing it to join the test programme.

On 1 July 2012, the LCH began a series of trials near Chennai; among other elements, the onboard air speed measurement system was evaluated and various component stresses were measured. Between late June and early July 2012, the second prototype, TD-2, was involved in a series of sea level trials. These trials covered flight performance, the measurement of loads, and the rotorcraft's handling qualities.

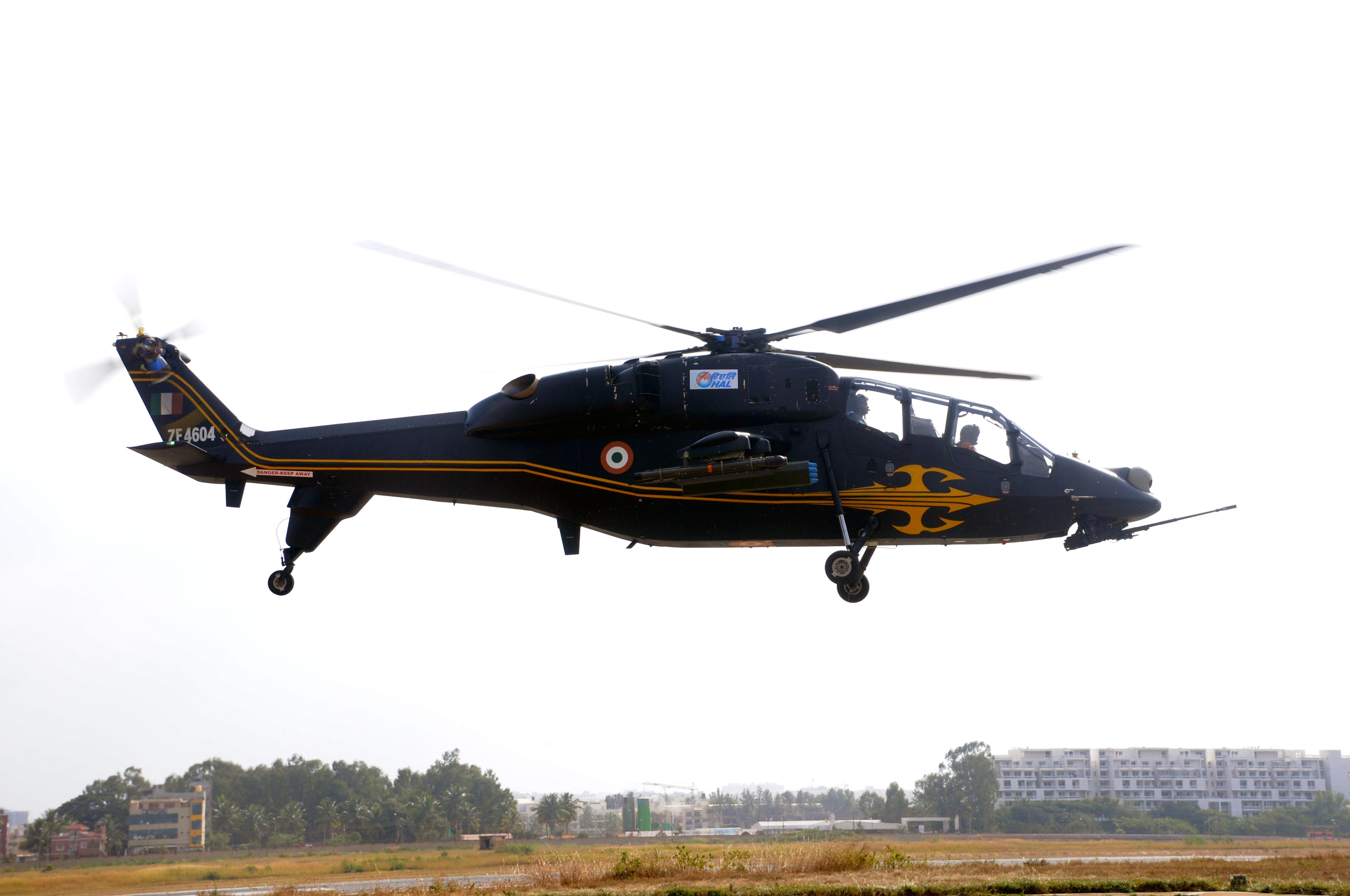
LCH armed with FZ275 LGR rockets and Mistral missile

During mid-2012, the third LCH prototype, which was claimed to be significantly lighter than either of its predecessors as well as incorporating various other improvements, was reportedly set to be delivered. The third prototype, TD-3, ultimately performed its maiden flight on 12 November 2014 for a duration of 20 minutes. Both TD-3 and TD-4 were extensively used during the test programme for the purpose of testing the rotorcraft's mission sensors and weapon systems, which involved a series of live-firing trials. Reportedly, a total of ₹126 crore (equivalent to ₹220 crore or US$23 million in 2026) had been sanctioned for the development and structural build of the fourth prototype.

During early 2015, a number of cold weather trials involving the third prototype (TD-3) were carried out at Leh Air Force Station (AFS). During these tests, engine start-up tests (performed using internal batteries after lengthy overnight exposure to the cold climate without special protective measures being applied) proved satisfactory at the temperatures as low as −18 °C at an altitude of 4.1 km (13,000 ft). Several flights were also carried out to assess the rotorcraft's high altitude performance and low speed handling. During the course of these tests, the LCH gained the distinction of being the first attack helicopter to land in Siachen, having repeatedly landed at several high altitude helipads, some of which being as high as 13,600 ft (4,100 m) to 15,800 ft (4,800 m).

During June 2015, the LCH successfully completed hot weather flight trials at Jodhpur, during which the type was exposed to temperatures ranging from 39 to 42 °C. The flight testing reportedly covered 'temperature survey of engine bay and hydraulic system', 'assessment of performance', 'handling qualities and loads' at different 'all up weights', 'low speed handling' and 'height-velocity diagram establishment'.

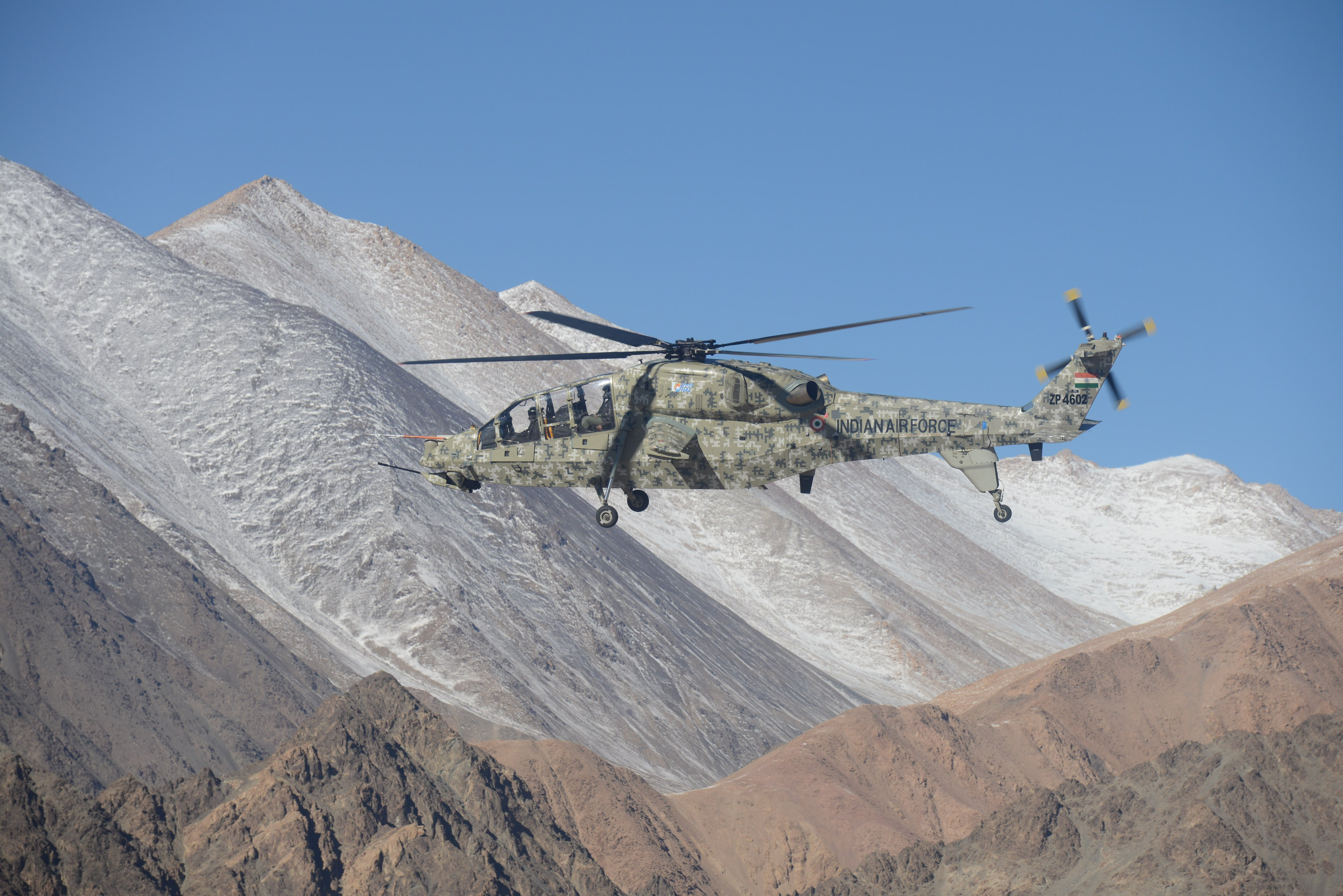
IAF flying LCH at Leh during 2020–2022 China–India skirmishes

On 1 December 2015, LCH TD-4 completed its first flight. By March 2016, the LCH had reportedly completed basic performance flight testing and outstation trials, including a number of live-fire tests involving prototype TD-3 firing 70 mm rockets in its weaponized configuration. By mid-2016, certification firing trials had commenced, these included tests of the integration of its mission sensors, such as the electro-optical system, helmet pointing system, and of the various armaments – air-to-air missiles, turret gun and rockets – that the type can deploy.

During mid-2016, the LCH was recognised as having completed its performance trials, paving way for the certification of its basic configuration; a letter confirming this status had been hand-delivered to HAL by CEMILAC in the presence of the Indian Defence Minister earlier on16 October 2015.

On 31 January 2018, LCH TD-2 was flown with an Automatic Flight Control System (AFCS) designed by HAL. The new system is expected to replace the previously imported Automatic Flight Control System. It was reported that an indeginious radar is under development for LCH.

On 17 January 2019, LCH completed weapons trials with the successful firing of Mistral-2 air-to-air missile at a flying target. On the same day, HAL announced that the LCH is ready for operational service after completing the required weapon integration tests.

=== Production ===
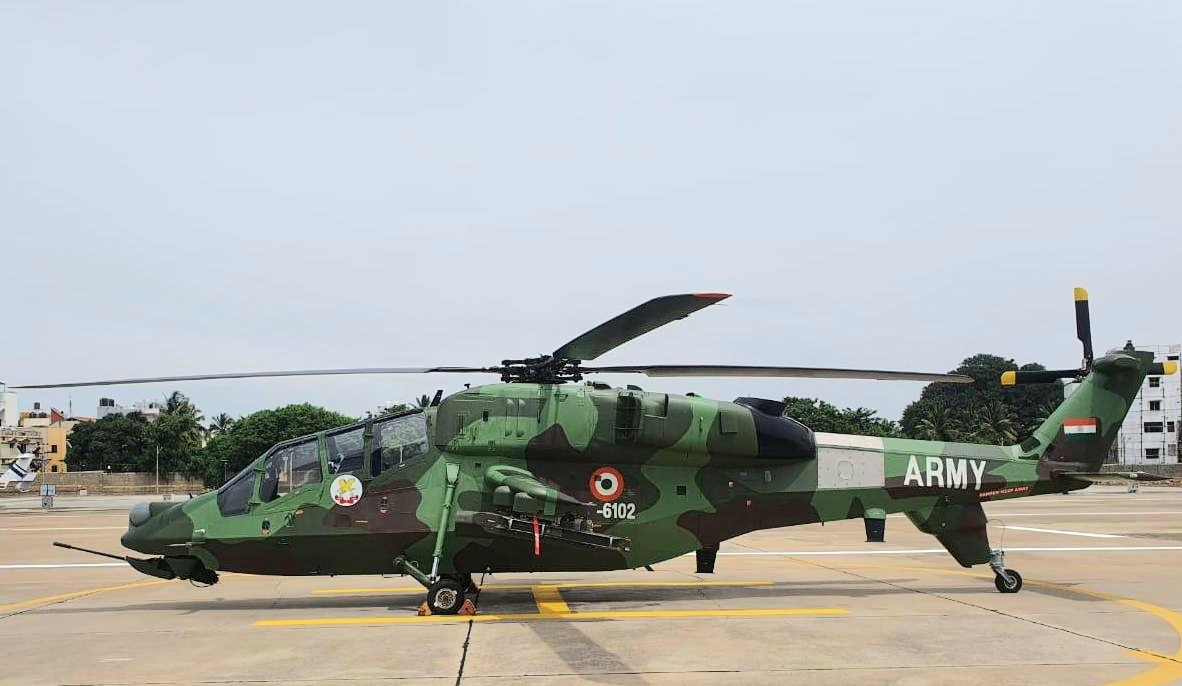
LCH for Army Aviation Corps at HAL facility

On 26 August 2017, full-scale production of the LSP variant of Prachand was formally inaugurated by Defence Minister Arun Jaitley after it received initial operation clearance (IOC) the same day. On 21 February 2019, Thales announced that it was awarded a contract to supply 135 70 mm rockets for 15 LCHs alongside 18 HAL Rudra.

The LCH was declared ready for full-scale production in February 2020. HAL's Helicopter Division, based in Bengaluru, has established a dedicated hangar to accommodate the LCH assembly line. During September 2020, the first LCH of the limited series production (LSP) batch had reportedly commenced ground-based testing.

Following the January 2025 HAL Dhruv crash of the Indian Coast Guard in which three personnel lost their lives, the Prachand fleet was also temporarily grounded as the LCH inherited some design features from Dhruv. The fleet was again cleared for operations on 11 June 2025 after replacing few sub-components as suggested by the defect investigation committee (DIC).

On 13 April 2026, Secretary (Defence Production), Sanjeev Kumar, inaugurated the LCH production line and an Automated Storage & Retrieval System (ASRS) at the Tumukru factory. He also visited the LUH production facility and the LCH equipping hangar. This facility will also be used during the production of HAL DBMRH and HAL IMRH.

==== Orders ====
In 2010, the Indian Army and Air Force were expected to acquire 114 and 65 LCH, respectively. In 2020, a total of 162 LCHs were planned to be ordered.

On 19 November 2021, Prime Minister Narendra Modi formally handed over the LCH to IAF Air Chief Marshal Vivek Ram Chaudhari, clearing way for full scale induction. 15 Limited Series Production variants for Army and Air Force are being built at HAL and the first two were scheduled to be delivered by March 2022. An additional hangar was set up in which reportedly is capable of achieving a peak production of 30 helicopters per year. On 22 July 2021, it was announced that HAL will deliver the first three LCHs to the Indian Air Force. On 30 March 2022, the Cabinet Committee on Security (CCS) approved the limited series production of 15 LCHs, including ten for the IAF and five for the Indian Army. The contract worth ₹3,887 crore (equivalent to ₹45 billion or US$470 million in 2026) along with infrastructure sanctions at ₹377 crore (equivalent to ₹436 crore or US$45 million in 2026) was signed in 2022 itself. As of August 2022, HAL had manufactured nine LCHs which were in the process of being delivered to the Services. The LSP deliveries are underway and are scheduled to be finished by July 2024.

On 29 September 2023, the Indian Air Force and Indian Army announced their intention to purchase 156 more helicopters. Subsequently, on 30 November 2023, the Defence Acquisition Council (DAC) accorded the Acceptance of Necessity (AoN) for the procurement. On 17 June 2024, the Ministry of Defence issued the Request for Proposal (RFP) for 156 additional helicopters. On 28 March 2025, the deal, worth ₹62,700 crore (equivalent to ₹650 billion or US$6.7 billion in 2026), was cleared by the Cabinet Committee on Security (CCS). The helicopters would be manufactured in HAL's Bangaluru and Tumakuru facility in Karnataka. On the same day, two contracts, one for 66 helicopters for the Air Force and another for 90 helicopters for the Army were signed with the Hindustan Aeronautics Limited. Both the contracts included training and other associated equipment. The deliveries would start from the third year of signing the contract followed by a delivery rate of 30 helicopters per year, completing the contract within the next 5 years. The helicopters will have an indigenous content of over 65%. Around 40% of the contract, or ₹25,000 crore (equivalent to ₹260 billion or US$2.7 billion in 2026), would be outsourced to the private sector firms to enhance defence ecosystem.

On 12 August 2026, HAL awarded a contract worth ₹184.25 crore (US$19 million) to BEML for the supply of fuselage aerostructures. On 14 August, it was announced that BEML and Adani Defence Systems and Technologies had partnered with HAL to supply fuselage structures for 48 and 42 Prachand helicopters, respectively. The production of the helicopters has already commenced at the Tumakuru facility. On 17 September 2026, HAL placed an order with KNDS for the supply of 126 THL-20 turrets for Prachand. The firm had earlier supplied 136 such turrets for the Advanced Light Helicopter programme.

=== Upgrades ===
In comparison to the limited series production helicopters used by the Indian military, the serial production variant will feature 7 new systems, including new weapons systems and at least four major upgrades. Newly integrated systems include directed infrared countermeasures, Indian-origin air-to-ground missiles and laser-guided rockets, contemporary electronic warfare systems, nuclear detection capabilities, a datalink for secure communication with other Indian military platforms to enhance network-centric capabilities, and an obstacle avoidance system. Meanwhile, multiple systems will be upgraded in the serial production helicopters like the electro-optical pod for improved tracking, surveillance, and targeting, as well as the helmet-mounted pointing system to improve pilot performance, are among the equipment that will be enhanced. The new systems are expected to be ready by 18 months. The final serial production version will gradually raise the indigenous content from 45% by value to above 65%.

HAL intents to deliver upgraded batches of Prachand from 2027 onwards and complete its orders for 156 choppers to the Indian Armed Forces by 2033. These choppers will be upgraded with Directed Infrared countermeasures, HMDS, a new Targeting system, Secure Datalinks, Nuclear detection and Electronic warfare suites along with newer weapon systems.

== Design ==
=== Overview ===
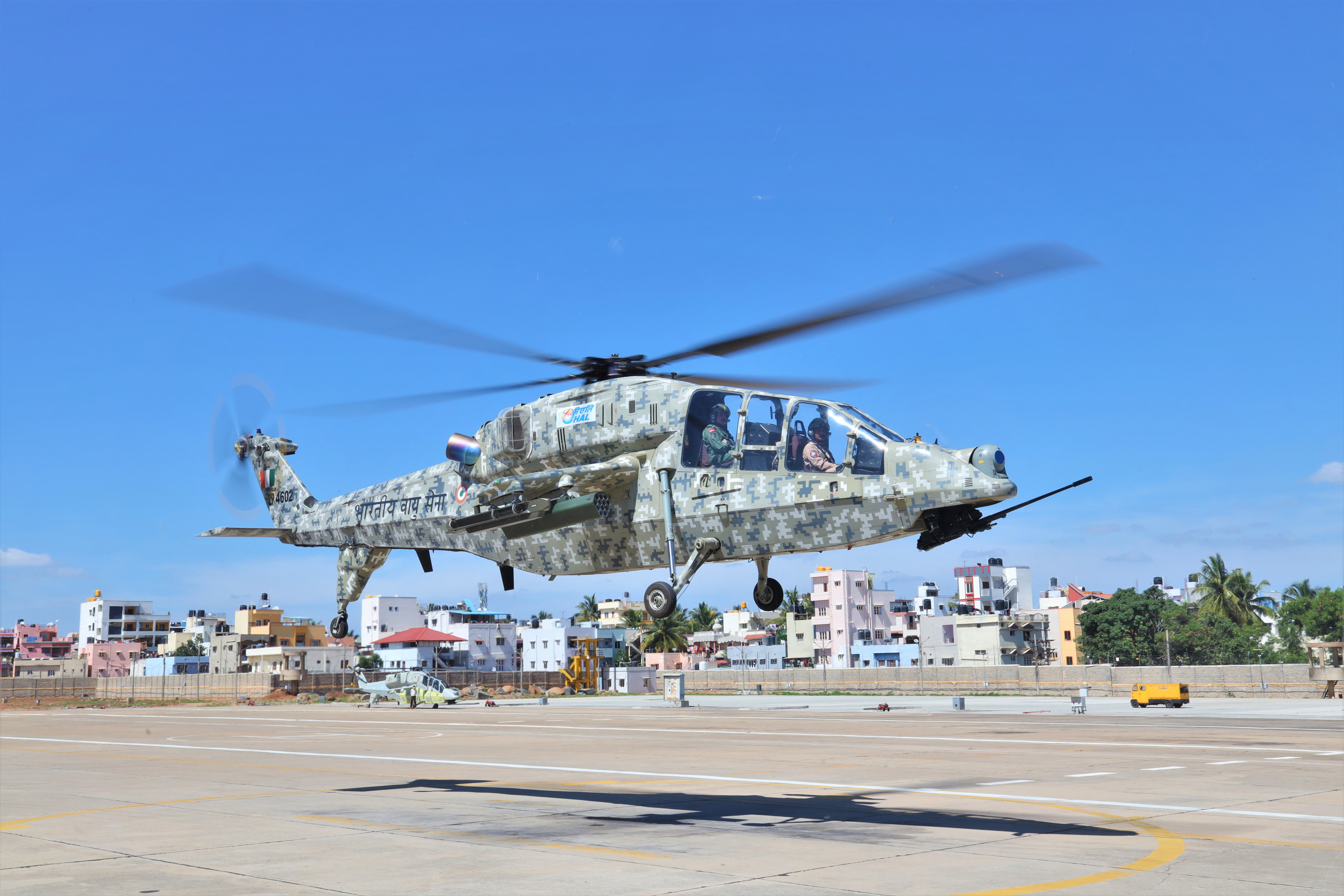
LCH sortie undertaken by Air Chief Marshal R. K. S. Bhadauria

The HAL Prachand is a multirole combat helicopter, designed to perform various attack profiles, including relatively high altitude flight. The design and development of the Prachand was done in-house, by the Rotary Wing Research and Design Centre (RWR&DC), an internal design office of HAL dedicated to the design of helicopters.

The Prachand is a derivative of the HAL Dhruv, which had been developed during the 1990s and inducted into the Indian Armed Forces during the early 2000s. Basing the LCH on an existing helicopter is expected to greatly reduce the associated costs of the programme, which was estimated to be roughly ₹376 crore (US$39.0 million) in 2010. Shared elements between the two helicopters include the power-plant used, both being powered by a pair of co-developed HAL/Turbomeca Shakti-1H1 derived from Safran Ardiden turboshaft engines, albeit fitted with infrared suppressors. The features that are unique to the rotorcraft includes its narrow fuselage, a crashworthy tricycle landing gear arrangement, crashworthy self-sealing fuel tanks, armour protection, and a low visibility profile; these design elements have been attributed as having resulted in a relatively lethal, agile and survivable rotorcraft. Atypically for a combat helicopter, it shall also be capable of high-altitude warfare (HAW), possessing an in-service operational ceiling of 6,000–6,500 metres (19,700–21,300 ft).

Equipped with a two-person tandem cockpit to accommodate a pilot and co-pilot/gunner, it has been developed to perform both the anti-infantry and anti-armour missions. In addition to these roles, the LCH is intended to be used for a variety of operational purposes, such as to perform air defence against slow-moving aerial targets, including both manned aircraft and unmanned aerial vehicles (UAVs), participation in counter-insurgency operations (COIN) and Counter Surface Force Operations (CSFO), the destruction of enemy air defence operations and wider offensive use during urban warfare conditions, escort to special heliborne operations (SHBO), support of combat search and rescue (CSAR) operations, and armed aerial scouting duties.

In terms of its basic configuration, Prachand possesses a relatively narrow fuselage and is equipped with stealth profiling, armour protection, and is equipped to conduct day-and-night combat operations. According to reports, the protective measures included in the rotorcraft includes a digital camouflage system, an infrared (IR) suppressor fitted to the engine exhaust, and an exterior covered by canted flat panels to minimise its radar cross-section (RCS). It is furnished with an integrated dynamic system, including a hingeless main rotor and bearing-less tail rotor, which works in conjunction with an anti-resonance isolation system to dampen vibrations. During Aero India 2011, HAL's Rotary Wing Research & Design Centre informed the press that the helicopter is "probably the most agile design in the world because of its rotor".

In September 2024, HAL assigned TimeTooth Technologies, based in Bengaluru, for indigenisation of Rotor Damp System to be used on HAL Prachand and ALH Dhruv. The project involves development and qualification of the system for the next two years followed by its production and supply would be for a period of 5 years and beyond. The majority of the project will be funded by the private company itself. The production order value is expected to exceed $5 million within the 5-year period.

=== Avionics and armaments ===
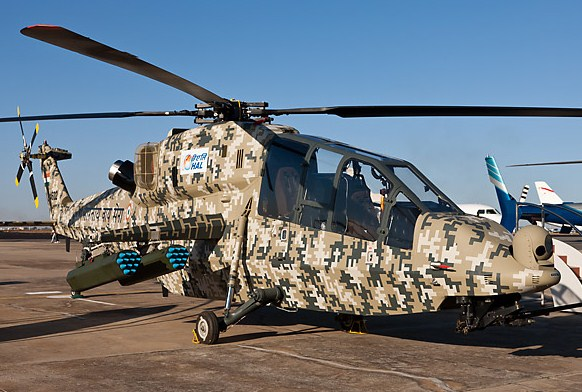
LCH with underwing rocket pods mounted on its stub wings

The LCH is furnished with a glass cockpit which accommodates an Integrated Avionics and Display System (IADS) which used an array of multifunction displays in conjunction with the onboard target acquisition and designation (TADS) system. A prominent element of the TADS system is the helmet mounted sight (HMS), which serves as the principal instrument for targeting and triggering the rotorcraft's armaments. The LCH is protected via an extensive electronic warfare suite which is provided by the South African division of Saab Group; this suite comprises various defensive elements to guard against several different threats, these include a radar warning receiver (RWR), laser warning receiver (LWR) and a missile approach warning (MAW) system.

The LCH is equipped with an integrated data link, which enables the type to participate in network-centric operations by facilitating the transfer of mission data to other platforms, comprising both airborne and ground-based elements. This networking capable is said to facilitate operational cooperation and force multiplication practices. The onboard sensor suite is Elbit CoMPASS, produced locally by Bharat Electronics Limited. It consists of a CCD camera, a forward looking infrared (FLIR) imaging sensor, a laser rangefinder and a laser designator to facilitate target acquisition under all-weather conditions, including under night-time conditions. The series production variant will come with Integrated Architecture Display System (IADS) and Automatic Flight Control System (AFCS) which are locally developed by HAL with private sector industries.

During initial development in 2006, it was announced that HAL had selected the M621 cannon to serve as the gun armament of the helicopter. The M621 cannon is incorporated in a Nexter-built THL 20 turret and integrated into a helmet-mounted sight. Various missiles can also be equipped upon the LCH; these include a maximum of four quadpacked anti-tank guided missiles on two hardpoints underneath each wing - options are to include both foreign and Indian-built missiles, the latter in the form of the HELINA/Dhruvastra anti-tank missile. In terms of air-to-air missiles, the LCH shall be capable of being armed with the MBDA ATAM missile. Prachand can also fire FZ275 LGR rockets for attacking soft targets . Prachand is also nteegrated with Mistral-2 air-to-air missiles for anti-helicopter and anti-drone operations.

== Operational history ==
=== Indian Air Force ===
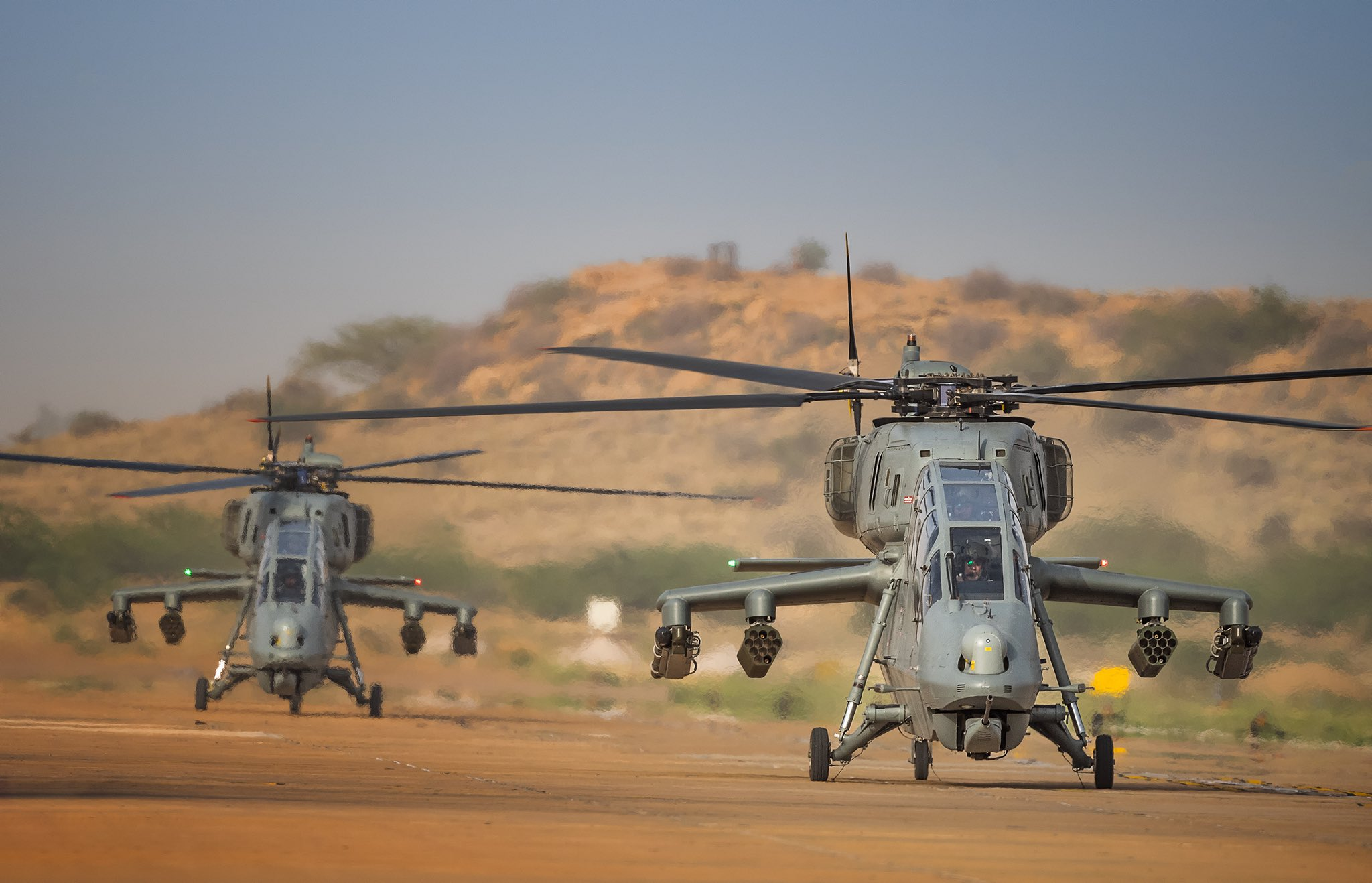
HAL Prachand taxiing at Jodhpur Air Force Station

During November 2016, the Indian Ministry of Defence (MoD) authorised the purchase of an initial batch of 15 LCHs with 10 for the Indian Air Force (IAF) and 5 for the Indian Army Aviation Corps (AAC), referred to as being a limited series production order. By mid-2017, the AAC had panned to place a combined order for 114 LCHs, while the IAF had planned an order for 65 LCHs. The AAC intended to deploy the indigenous LCH alongside the American-built Boeing AH-64 Apache attack helicopter. In January 2021, government gave initial approval for the production of an initial batch of 15 LCHs, ten for the IAF and five for the AAC.

On 7 August 2020, IAF's Vice Chief Air Marshal Harjit Singh Arora flew an LCH from Thoise to Leh accompanied by a HAL test pilot in full mission configuration. On 12 August 2020, HAL announced that the Indian Air Force has deployed two LCH prototypes to Ladakh for conducting armed patrols from forward air bases. It can perform offensive operations at Siachen Glacier-Saltoro Mountains region.

IAF formally inducted HAL Prachand into 143 Helicopter Unit at Jodhpur Air Force Station on 3 October 2022. On the same day, the Defence Minister Rajnath Singh officially named the helicopter "Prachand".

=== Indian Army ===
HAL Prachand performing during Aero India 2023

On 1 June 2022, an attack squadron – 351 Army Aviation Squadron – was raised by the Army Aviation Corps in Bengaluru for LCH operations. A total of seven squadrons are planned in the mountains, each with ten LCH helicopters. The helicopter squadron was to be moved to Missamari, Assam (250 km (160 mi) away from Line of Actual Control) by October-end. By 1 November 2022, 2 helicopters were moved to Missamari with the third and fourth planned to move to the new location in November and December, respectively. The squadron was scheduled receive fifth and last LSP helicopter in January 2023. Army variants of helicopter are to be armed with 20 mm nose gun, 70 mm rockets, helicopter-launched anti-tank guided missile and a new air-to-air missile different from the Mistral 2 missile used on air force variant.

The Army has plans to deploy LCH in the Ladakh sector by 2024–25. On 12 November 2024, Indian Army's Gajraj Corps conducted high-altitude firing of autocannon and guided rockets in the Northeast India.Indian Army Chief Upendra Dwivedi visited HAL on 9 April 2026 to take delivery of further Prachand units for the Army Aviation corps and also undertook a brief sortie in the helicopter.

== Foreign sales ==
=== Interests ===
Achieving export sales for the LCH has been a stated priority of both HAL and the Indian government. During mid-2016, a spokesperson for the Defence Ministry stated the ministry was in the process of holding discussions with several unidentified African nations on the topic of the LCH. On 1 December 2021, HAL was reported to be competing for a contract for a potential Nigerian order against Italy, Turkey and the US. On 21 October 2022, Argentine officials visited HAL facilities to examine the Prachand as Argentina expressed interest in the helicopter. A HAL official reported in June 2023 that Argentinian interest was shown during Aero India 2023.

In July 2023, HAL announced that a letter of intent would be signed with Argentinian officials. In April 2024, talks were reported to be held with the Philippines, Egypt and Nigeria.

==== Nigeria ====
As per reports on 17 September 2024, the Nigerian Army is nearing the completion of negotiations with HAL to sign a deal to purchase 4 HAL Prachand helicopters through a soft credit arrangement. Previously, Nigerian Army pilots were trained at Rotary Wing Academy of HAL in India to operate HAL Dhruv.

==== Brazil ====
Brazil has shown interest in the LCH Prachand with a potential swap deal of Embraer C-390s in exchange of a few units of Tejas Mk1A and Prachand.

A decision is expected before the end of 2026.

== Operators ==
India

15 in service, 156 more on order.

- Indian Air Force: 10 in service, 66 more on order.
  - Jodhpur Air Force Station
    - No. 143 Helicopter Unit (Dhanush) (2022)
- Indian Army: 5 in service, 90 more on order.
  - Missamari Army Aviation Base
    - 351 Army Aviation Squadron (2022)

Nigeria

- Nigerian Army: 4 planned.

== Specifications ==
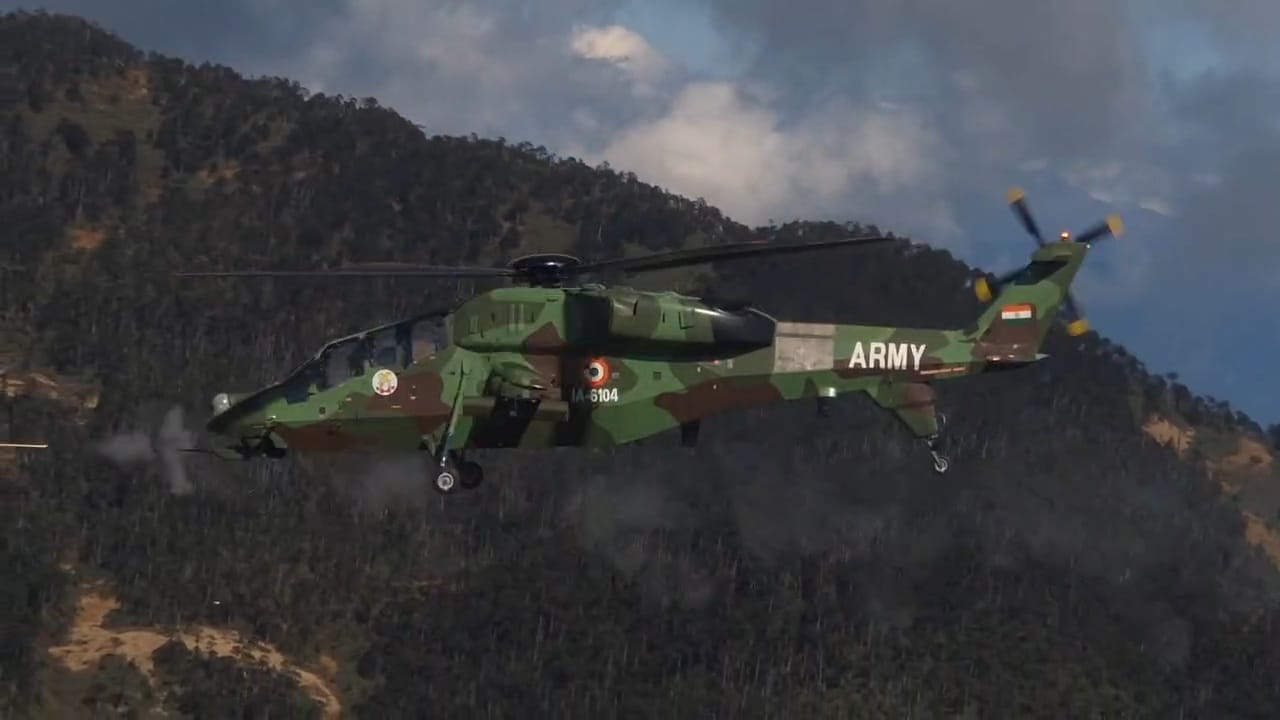
Indian Army's Prachand firing THL-20 turret at high altitude

Data from Jane's All the World's Aircraft, Jane's Defence Weekly, and HAL India

General characteristics

- Crew: 2
- Length: 15.8 m (51 ft 10 in)
- Wingspan: 4.60 m (15 ft 1 in)
- Height: 4.70 m (15 ft 5 in)
- Empty weight: 2,250 kg (4,960 lb)
- Max takeoff weight: 5,800 kg (12,787 lb)
- Fuel capacity: 1800 kg (1440 Liters)
- Payload: 1,750 kg (3,860 lb) weapons
- Powerplant: 2 × HAL/Turbomeca Shakti-1H1 turboshaft, 1,032 kW (1,384 hp) each
- Main rotor diameter: 13.2 m (43 ft 4 in)

Performance

- Maximum speed: 280 km/h (170 mph, 150 kn)
- Never exceed speed: 330 km/h (205 mph, 178 kn)
- Range: 700 km (435 mi, 378 nmi) with weapons
- Endurance: 3 hours 10 minutes
- Service ceiling: 6,500 m (21,300 ft)
- Rate of climb: 12 m/s (2,400 ft/min)

Armament

- Guns: 1 x 20 mm M621 cannon on Nexter THL-20 turret with 800 rounds per minute
- Hardpoints: 4 , with provisions to carry combinations of:
  - Rockets:
    - 4 × 12 FZ275 LGR
  - Missiles:
    - Air-to-air missiles:
      - 4 × 2 Mistral
    - Anti-tank guided missile
      - 4 × 4 Dhruvastra (planned)
  - Bombs:
    - Precision-guided munition
      - 2 × HSLD-250 (planned)
    - Cluster munition
    - Unguided bomb
      - 2 × Prefragmented bomb 250 (planned)
    - Grenade launcher

Avionics

- Elbit CoMPASS optoelectronic suite
- Missile approach warning system
- Saab radar and laser warning system
- Chaff and flare dispensers

== See also ==
Related development

- HAL Dhruv
- HAL Rudra

Aircraft of comparable role, configuration, and era

- Agusta A129 Mangusta
- Bell AH-1Z Viper
- CAIC Z-10
- Denel Rooivalk
- Eurocopter Tiger
- Harbin Z-19
- TAI/AgustaWestland T129

Related lists

- List of rotorcraft
