= HAL Tejas Mk2 =

Indian 4.5 gen multirole fighter

Tejas Mark 2/Medium Weight Fighter
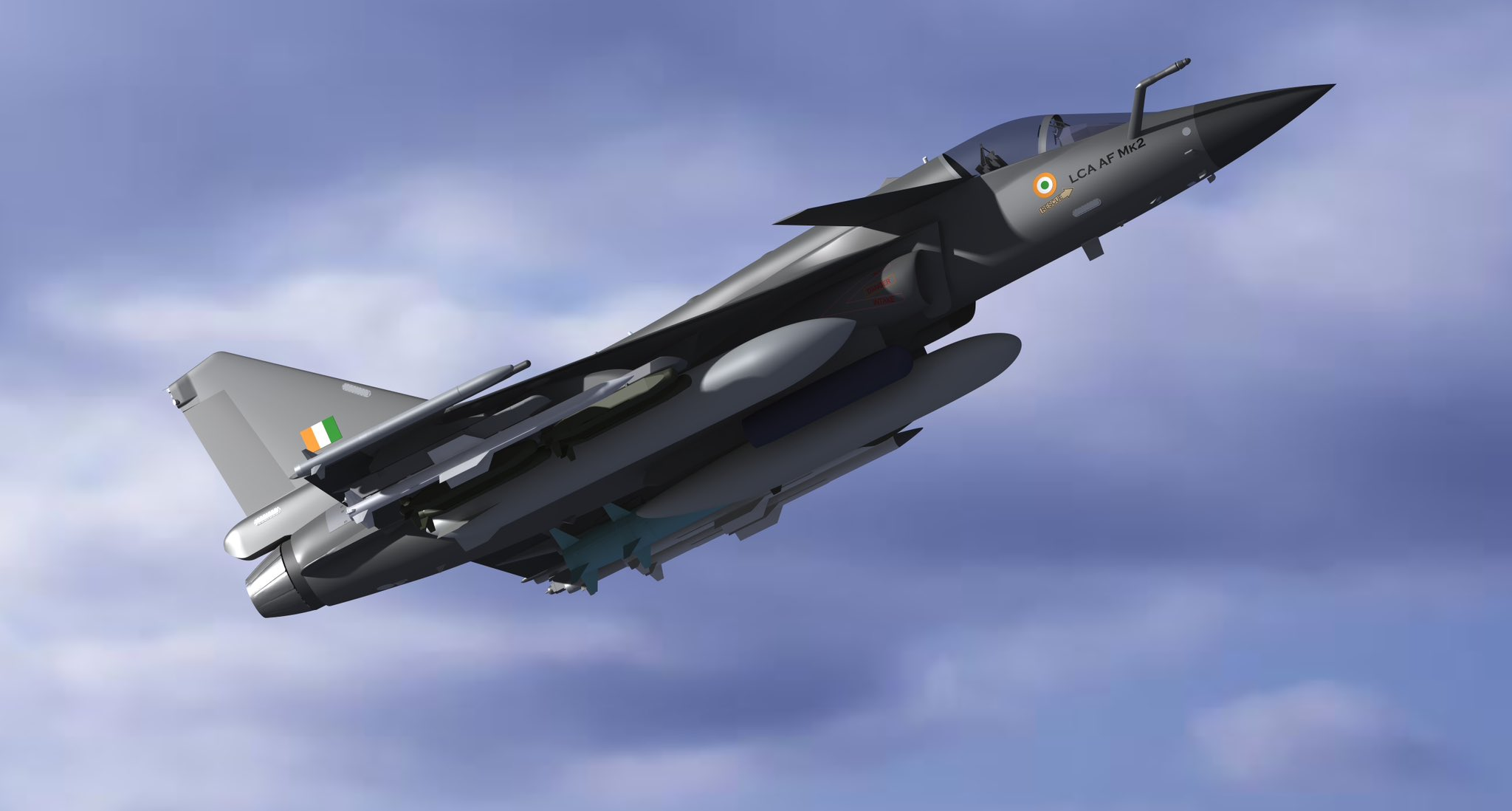
- An aerial render of Tejas Mark 2

General information
- Type: Multirole fighter
- National origin: India
- Manufacturer: Hindustan Aeronautics Limited
- Designer: Aeronautical Development Agency; Aircraft Research and Design Centre (HAL)
- Status: Prototype development
- Primary user: Indian Air Force (intended)

History
- Manufactured: Prototype
- Developed from: HAL Tejas

The HAL Tejas Mark 2 (lit. 'Radiance'), or Medium Weight Fighter (MWF), is an Indian 4.5 generation, single-engine, canard delta wing, multirole combat aircraft designed by the Aeronautical Development Agency in collaboration with Aircraft Research and Design Centre (ARDC) of Hindustan Aeronautics Limited for the Indian Air Force. It is a further development of the HAL Tejas, with an elongated airframe, close coupled canards, new sensors, and a more powerful engine. The roll-out of the first prototype is expected by 2025, first flight within 2026 and mass production by 2029.

The fighter is being designed and developed to replace multiple strike fighters of IAF viz, the SEPECAT Jaguar, Dassault Mirage 2000, and Mikoyan MiG-29. The indigenous content of the fighter will be 82% initially and will cross 90% after the licensed production of its engine.

== Development ==
=== MWF Programme ===
The development of Tejas Mark 2 or MWF was initiated to address all the shortcomings in the Tejas Mark 1 and Mark 1A, and to meet the original air staff requirements set out for the LCA programme by the IAF. The development of the Tejas Mark 2 was authorised in November 2009 as a continuation of LCA programme, under the phase 3 of full-scale engineering development (FSED) process. (Note: The FSED process of the LCA programme was begun in 1993 with first two phases completed so far, which resulted in the development of Tejas Mark 1, Mark 1A, LCA trainer, LCA Navy Mark 1 and LCA Navy trainer variants) The FSED phase 3 consisted of design, development and manufacturing of two prototypes. Initially planned as an upsized Tejas, with a 0.5 m fuselage plug to accommodate more fuel and a more powerful engine, the Tejas Mark 2 design has evolved over years into a completely new medium-weight class fighter.

The preliminary design studies for the Tejas Mark 2 was completed in 2014 and was in the detailed design phase as of 2015. The redesigned fighter was first unveiled at the Aero India 2019, it was a 17.5-tonne-class fighter with close-coupled canards and integrated IRST system. Metal-cutting for the Tejas Mark 2 started in February 2021. The "roll out" of the first prototype was scheduled for August 2022, but has been postponed to end of 2022. Its first flight was expected to be in late 2023. In total, four prototypes are being planned initially.

The Aeronautical Development Agency (ADA) completed its critical design review on 15 November 2021, with a total of 20 subsystems for the aircraft cleared by IAF for production. From 62% in Tejas Mark 1A, the plan is to touch the 70% mark in indigenization for Mark 2. More foreign components are replaced by locally developed ones that are sufficiently matured as ADA and DRDO will carry forward some of the critical technologies from the LCA programme. Private suppliers of line-replaceable units also increased from 344 during Tejas Mark 1A development to 410. HAL had already outsourced 25% of the work share to the private sector.

On September 1, 2022, the Cabinet Committee on Security cleared ₹10,000 crore (equivalent to ₹120 billion or US$1.2 billion in 2026) for Tejas Mark 2 that includes prototype development and flight testing. The cost of fighter jet development will take ₹6,500 crore (equivalent to ₹75 billion or US$780 million in 2026) in addition to ₹2,500 crore (equivalent to ₹29 billion or US$300 million in 2026) sanctioned previously through internal funding. HAL planned high speed taxi trials from 2023 and limited series production from 2025. The entire development process will be completed by 2027 with serial production from 2030. Tejas Mark 2 will become operationally available from 2028. Apart from current commitment of 110-120 aircraft that will form six squadrons, expectations include an additional order of 210 aircraft.

As per a report, 16 countries has shown interest in Tejas MK2 at DefExpo 2022. Indian government plans to identify Indian private sector companies to become program partner with HAL rather than suppliers of components to increase the production rate and decrease the cost for exports under “special purpose vehicle” scheme. HAL is planning to form its own consortium to fast track the manufacturing process. It was maintained in 2022 and as late as June 2023 that despite previous delays the first prototype would roll out by December 2023 and the first flight would happen by December 2024 with four prototypes expected to be completed by 2027 for testing purpose. However, in December 2023 a revised schedule with a fresh four-year delay was announced due to waiting upon the government to provide development funding for the program and the government increasing the requirement for parts indigenization from 65% to 80%, these factors resulted in the first aircraft rollout now not being expected until late 2026 or early 2027 and the first test flight now not expected to occur until 2028.

On 9 August 2024, a high-level review meeting chaired by Dr. Samir V. Kamat, Chairman of DRDO was held at DRDO Bhawan to review the progress of the prototype development. The meeting was attended by Indian Air Force Deputy Chief, Air Marshal Ashutosh Dixit, Director Generals of all the DRDO labs which are a part of the programme, the Centre for Military Airworthiness & Certification (CEMILAC), and National Flight Test Centre under ADA. It was concluded that the project is on track. The only delay factor is the delivery of the F414 engines. The prototype fabriation, overseen by Aircraft and Systems Testing Establishment of the IAF, is set to begin in September 2024 as most of the small equipment along with the fuselage section has reached the assembly facility in Bengaluru. Rigorous trials at every stage will be carried out by ASTE test pilots.

In a press conference in early October 2024, the then newly appointed COAS Air Chief Marshal Amar Preet Singh revealed that the first flight of the Tejas Mk 2 is expected by October 2025 while the Research & Development of the aircraft is to be completed by December 2027.

In February 2025, in the context of Aero India 2025, FlightGlobal reported that 55% of the first prototype has been manufactured. The project director of Tejas Mk2 said, "the first prototype’s wings and forward fuselage are almost ready, with activities related to the manufacture of the centre fuselage already completed and production of the rear fuselage to commence shortly". Prototype roll out is planned by end of 2025 with first flight planned in first quarter of 2026. The four prototypes would be built by 2027, final operational clearance is expected by 2028 and induction by 2028-29. The Jet will entirely be configured with indigenous weapons and will have 11 weapon stations. The project was delayed by a year due to funding delays that was result in September 2023. Also, six F414-INS6 engines are available with ADA which has modified and qualified for prototype development. The complete propulsion system for the jet was integrated and tested from a ground test bed for the first time in January.

Currently, the Tejas Mark 2 programme is tied to the American GE F414 engine, which offers 98 kN of thrust. GE and HAL have signed a technology transfer agreement under which 80% of the engine will be manufactured in India. However, delays in supply and rising costs have slowed progress, prompting India to consider alternatives like French aerospace giant Safran which has submitted formal proposals to India's Gas Turbine Research Establishment and HAL to collaborate on developing advanced jet engine for Tejas Mark 2. Safran has now emerged as a strong contender, offering a 110 kN thrust engine for the Tejas Mk-2. This engine is expected to enhance the aircraft's speed, payload capacity and endurance.

On 8 July, PK Mishra, principal secretary to the Prime Minister, visited the HAL's LCA Mk2 Hangar at Aircraft Research and Design Centre to review the progress of the programme.

On 23 April 2026, a report indicated that the Tejas Mk2 prototype is undergoing integration checks, systems validation and ensuring overall aircraft readiness including structural integrity assessments, avionics testing, and flight control validation. This is expected to be followed by ground testing, taxi trials and certification processes before its maiden flight which is expected in mid-2026. The CEMILAC is fast tracking the process of the First Flight Clearance (FFC) which involves evaluation of structural strength, safety compliance, avionics performance and flight control systems. The flight will be conducted in the prototype's primer paint to prioritise testing and iterative improvements.

On 30 April, National Aerospace Laboratories (NAL) delivered the first set of composite materials for the centre fuselage for the Tejas Mk2 aircraft to ADA. The project was sanctioned in July 2023 by ADA.

As per a Hindustan Times report in September 2026, the structure and coupling of front, centre and rear fuselage was completed and the airframe was ready. The first ground run is targeted for March 2027 followed by the maiden flight. Meanwhile, IAF is moving forward the case for a contract. Later that month, the Defence Secretary, Rajesh Kumar Singh, announced that the maiden flight is expected in mid-2027, while media reports indicated that test flight are scheduled between June and September 2027.

== Design ==
Animation of Tejas MK2 in flight

Apart from design commonalities and a few critical systems from its predecessor Tejas Mark 1A, most of the technologies are to be borrowed from whatever has been developed so far for the Advanced Medium Combat Aircraft programme. Several radar cross-section-reducing measures will be incorporated in the airframe design so that a degree of frontal stealth can be achieved, including radar-absorbent material coating and composites making up its skin and twisted air-intake ducts. It has a tail-less compound delta-wing configuration with a single vertical stabilizer and close-coupled canards to provide static instability and high manoeuvrability, and is equipped with fly-by-wire systems to control instability.

=== Technological upgrades ===
This MWF is also to feature an indigenous integrated life-support system-onboard oxygen generation system (ILSS-OBOGS), from Defence Bioengineering and Electromedical Laboratory, aircraft health and usage monitoring system to integrate various sensors onboard Tejas Mark 2 from Defence Institute of Advanced Technology and a built-in integrated electro-optic electronic warfare suite, among other improvements to avionics. Utilizing extra fuselage space, ADA designed a larger air-intake for GE's F414 INS6 engine.

During Exercise Tarang Shakti on August 16, 2024, at Sulur Air Force Station, MRF presented its Aero-Muscle tire, which was designed primarily for the Tejas Mark 2. It can endure increased weight, higher speed, and more demanding operating conditions. As opposed to the Mark 1/1A's 26 X 8.0-14 dimension, the Mark 2's tires are 27.5 X 7.5-16.

The HAL MWF will also incorporate the Israeli X-guard towed decoy system, previously used by IAF Rafales during the 2025 India-Pakistan conflict.

=== Sensors and avionics ===
The avionics of Tejas Mark 2 will be centered on multisensor data fusion incorporating both active and passive sensors on board. The Tejas Mark 2 would be equipped with a variant of Uttam AESA Radar developed by Electronics and Radar Development Establishment, an integrated IRST system for passive target acquisition, a Unified Electronic Warfare Suite (UEWS) for survivability and a new Digital Flight Control Computer (DFCC). The Tejas Mark 2 will have indigenous software-defined radio-based tactical data link for secured communication and network-centric warfare capabilities supported by Air Force Network digital information grid.The MWF will have an indeginious infra-red search and track system and a missile approach warning system (MAWS). An increase in payload capacity to 6,500 kg (14,300 lb) and internal fuel capacity to over 3,400 kg (7,500 lb), will allow it to carry more weapons with a longer range.

The Tejas Mark 2 added an auxiliary computer to boost redundancy and reliability and reduce system failures. It will work together with the Mission Management and Display Computer (MMDC) and the DFCC. In the event that any of the primary systems malfunctions, the auxiliary computer is built to take over automatically. Under combat stress, the triple-layer computer architecture will guarantee continuous operation. In order to improve mission success rates, the auxiliary computer will combine data from several onboard sensors, such as radar, EW systems, and infrared tracking, in real time to present the pilot with a single cohesive picture that will enable quicker decision-making, increased situational awareness, and less work in combat situations.

Data Patterns is developing a unified display system that will combine inputs from the Uttam AESA Radar, UEWS, targeting pods, and secure communication channels. An advanced avionics architecture will process real-time battlefield data and sensor feedback from various data streams concurrently, with the goal of enhancing pilots' situational awareness and mission control. The company will deliver IRST and MAWS sensors.

=== Cockpit ===
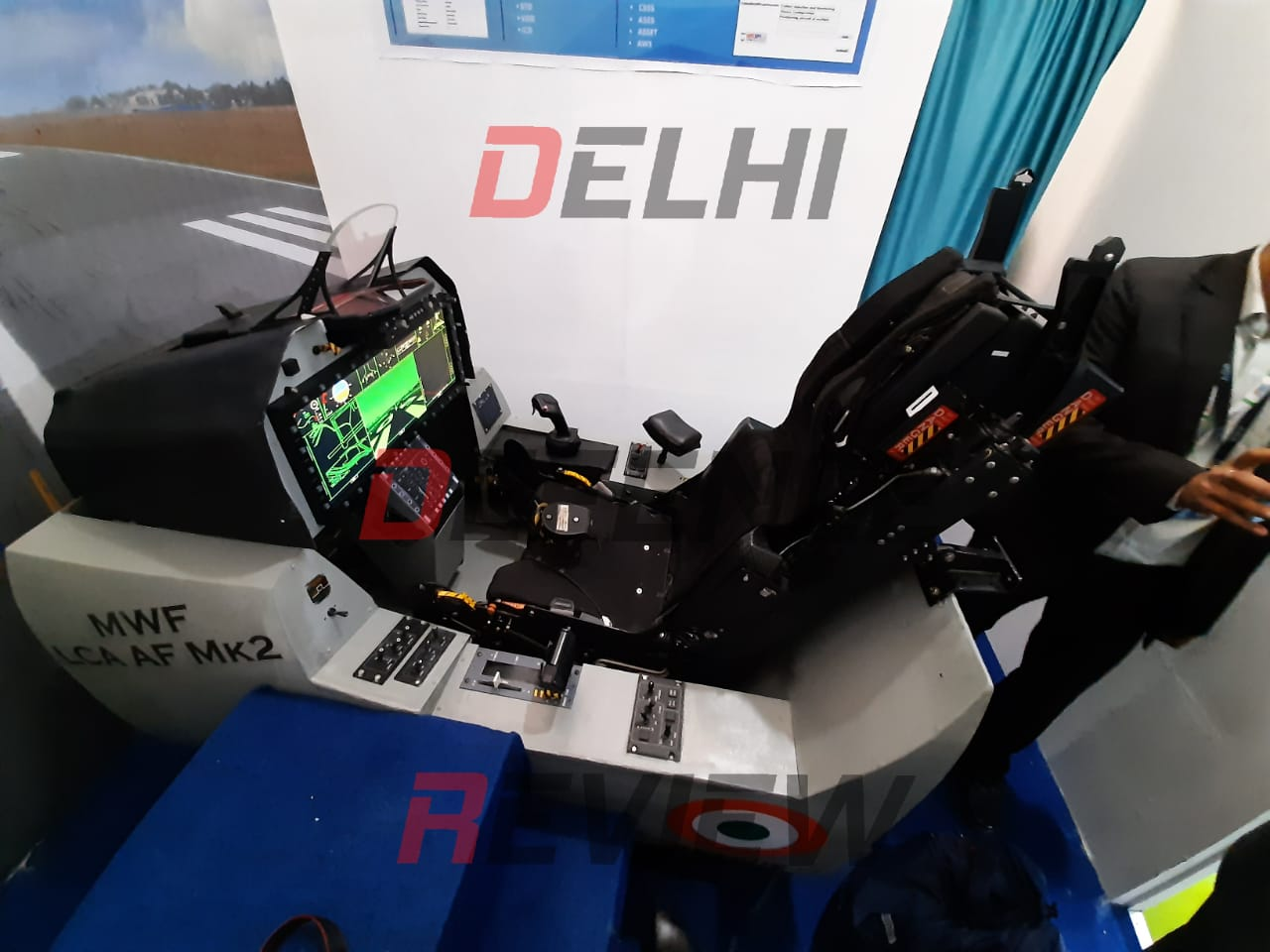
Tejas MK2 Cockpit Mockup

The Tejas Mark 2 will have a night vision goggles-compatible glass cockpit dominated by a touch-sensitive wide area display placed in panoramic orientation and a wide-angle holographic head-up display system. The Tejas Mark 2 will have ergonomically designed hands-on throttle-and-stick arrangement with right-hand-on-stick and left-hand-on-throttle settings to ease the pilot workload.

There will be fewer manual buttons and switches on the Tejas Mark 2. Touchscreens have been added to the cockpit for effective control, meeting the demands of the next generation of pilots. In order to decrease reaction time in combat scenarios, the positioning has been designed to enable the pilot to access HOTAS without moving excessively. The radar and missile systems are not physically activated by a button. The pilot will be notified when the mission software automatically activates them based on the circumstances.

=== Propulsion ===
The aircraft will use the F414-GE-INS6 powerplant which has a maximum thrust output of 98 kN and also offers improved specific fuel consumption over the F404 IN20 engine selected to power both Mark 1 and Mark 1A variants of Tejas. The aircraft is designed keeping in mind that GE's F414 would be replaced once an Indian powerplant is available. Hence, the future engine replacement should make minimal changes in the configuration.

By 2023, 8 units of F414 has been delivered to Aeronautical Development Agency as part of a 99 engine-deal.

The engine was selected through a request for proposal released by ADA in 2008 in search of a 95–100 kilonewtons (21,000–22,000 lbf) thrust-class engine for the Tejas Mk 2 after delinking the Kaveri engine from the programme. Both of the competing designs, the Eurojet EJ200 and GE F414, were found technically compliant, with Eurojet’s $666 million bid initially lower than GE’s $822 million. However, after negotiations, GE emerged as the lower bidder. On 1 October 2010, ADA selected GE’s F414-GE-INS6, the highest thrust variant, with an estimated order of 99 engines. An initial batch would be supplied by GE, while the following engines would be produced in India under a transfer of technology pact, subject to U.S. government approval. The remaining process of finalising the contract would be completed by 2011.

On 22 June 2023, following over a decade of delays, HAL and GE signed a memorandum of understanding in order to co-produce the jet engine in India. All executive and legislative approvals for the project was acquired from the US government by June and August 2023, respectively.

As of August 2024, the negotiations for technology transfer for licensed production would start soon which will be followed by signing of final contract within six months. Production of indigenous engines in a new Bengaluru facility is to start within 2 years of signing the deal and delivery within three years of the same. As of September 2024, the Government of India was forming a negotiating committee for the deal with representatives from Ministry of Defence, HAL, ADA and GTRE. A majority of the workshare might be outsourced to the private sector.

By April 2026, an agreement was reached following the technical negotiations for the F414 deal. This will be followed by commercial negotiations and signing the contract by March 2027.

== Operators ==
India

Indian Air Force – 10 squadrons

- Phase 1 – 6 squadrons
- Phase 2 – 4 squadrons

== Specifications (projected) ==
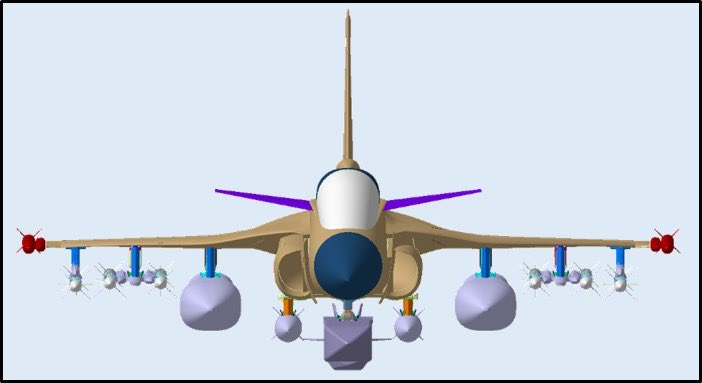
Tejas MKII load configuration

Data from Jane's Defence Weekly, Onmanorama, Defexpo 2020 and Aero India 2021

General characteristics

- Crew: One or two
- Length: 14.65 m (48 ft 1 in)
- Wingspan: 8.50 m (27 ft 11 in)
- Height: 4.87 m (16 ft 0 in)
- Empty weight: 7,850 kg (17,306 lb) (expected)
- Gross weight: 11,300 kg (24,912 lb) (expected)
- Max takeoff weight: 17,500 kg (38,581 lb) (expected)
- Fuel capacity: 3,400 kg (7,500 lb) internal; additional 3,500 kg (7,700 lb) with drop tank
- Payload: 6,500 kg (14,300 lb) external stores
- Powerplant: 1 × General Electric F414-INS6 afterburning turbofan with FADEC, 98 kN (22,000 lbf) with afterburner (Indigenous engine to be used in future)

Performance

- Maximum speed: Mach 1.8
- Range: 3,000 km (1,900 mi, 1,600 nmi)
- Combat range: 1,200 km (750 mi, 650 nmi)
- Ferry range: 3,500 km (2,200 mi, 1,900 nmi) with 3 external fuel tanks
- Service ceiling: 17,300 m (56,758 ft)
- g limits: +9/−3.5

Armament

- Guns: 1 × 30 millimetres (1.2 in) GSh-30-1
- Hardpoints: 13 hardpoints with a capacity of around 6.5 tonnes (expected), with provisions to carry combinations of :
  - Air-to-air missile :
    - MICA (planned)
    - ASRAAM
    - Meteor (planned)
    - Astra
    - NG-CCM (planned)
  - Air-to-surface missile :
    - BrahMos-NG ALCM
    - LR-ALCM (planned)
    - Rudram 2/3 (planned)
    - SCALP-EG (planned)
    - Crystal Maze
  - Anti-radiation missile :
    - Rudram 1/2 (planned)
  - Bombs:
    - Precision-guided munition :
      - Spice
      - HSLD-100/250/450/500
      - DRDO Glide Bombs
      - Smart Anti-Airfield Weapon
    - Laser-guided bomb :
      - Sudarshan
    - Cluster munition
    - Loitering munition :
      - CATS ALFA
    - Unguided bomb

Avionics

- LRDE Uttam AESA Radar
- CASDIC Unified Electronic Warfare Suite (UEWS)
- CASDIC Dual Colour Missile Approach Warning System (DCMAWS)
- CASDIC Targeting pod

== See also ==
- HAL AMCA
- HAL HLFT-42

Related development

- HAL Tejas
- HAL TEDBF

Related lists

- List of fighter aircraft
- Fourth-generation jet fighter
