= Advanced Medium Combat Aircraft =

Indian fifth-generation stealth fighter

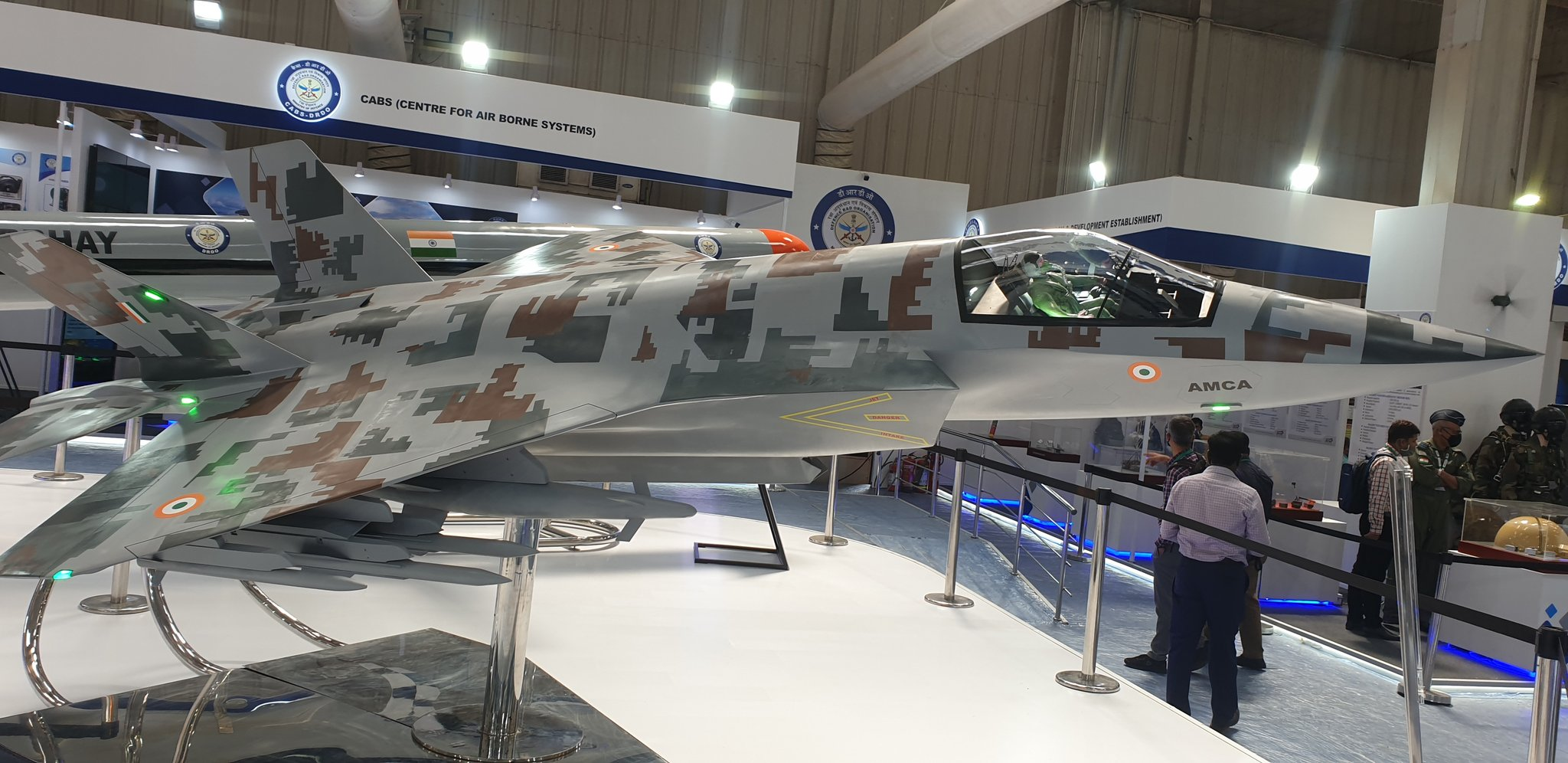
- Model at Aero India 2021

General information
- Type: Stealth multirole combat aircraft
- National origin: India
- Manufacturer
- Designer: Aeronautical Development Agency (ADA)
- Status: Prototype development
- Primary users: Indian Air Force (intended) Indian Navy (intended)

The Advanced Medium Combat Aircraft (AMCA) is a planned Indian single-seat, twin-engine, all-weather fifth-generation stealth, multirole combat aircraft being developed for the Indian Air Force and the Indian Navy. The aircraft is being designed by the Aeronautical Development Agency (ADA), an autonomous aircraft design body under the Ministry of Defence. The aircraft was previously planned to be manufactured by HAL; however, the Indian government now favors private companies and is currently in the process of selecting a manufacturer. The project began in 2009. The serial production of the aircraft is planned to start by 2035.

The AMCA is intended to perform a multitude of missions including air supremacy, ground-strike, suppression of enemy air defenses and electronic warfare missions. It is intended to supplant the Sukhoi Su-30MKI, which is an air superiority fighter and forms the backbone of the IAF fighter fleet. The AMCA design is optimized for low radar cross section and supercruise capability.

As of May 2026, the process to select the production partner for the prototype development phase is underway while ADA is establishing the new facility for prototype production and testing at a location close to the Sri Sathya Sai Airport in Puttaparthi, Andhra Pradesh. A proposal to establish a joint venture between Safran Aircraft Engines and the Gas Turbine Research Establishment (GTRE) to develop a high-thrust afterburning low-bypass turbofan for the aircraft is also expected to cleared within 15 August. It is currently the only fifth generation fighter under development in India.

== Development ==
=== AMCA programme ===
The AMCA programme, earlier known as the Medium Combat Aircraft (MCA) programme, is an Indian programme to develop a fifth-generation combat aircraft. It began as a parallel programme to the Indo-Russia Sukhoi/HAL FGFA. The AMCA programme was launched in 2010. Although envisioned as a 20-tonne class fighter earlier, now AMCA is 25-tonne class fighter.

==== Feasibility study phase ====
In April 2010, the Indian Air Force issued an Air Staff Qualitative Requirement (ASQR) for the AMCA. A feasibility study was launched in October 2010 after a fund allocation of ₹90 crore (equivalent to ₹220 crore or US$24 million in 2026) by the Defence Ministry. In November, the Aeronautical Development Agency (ADA) sought an additional funding of ₹9,000 crore (equivalent to ₹220 billion or US$2.4 billion in 2026) for the development of two technology demonstrators and seven prototypes. By the time, the first flight was expected in 2017.

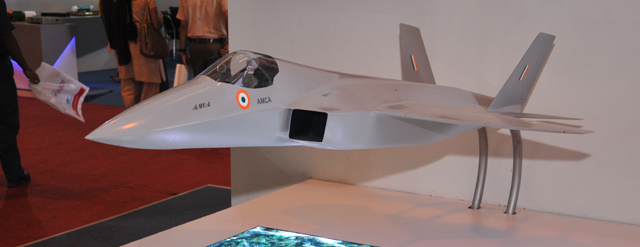
A scaled down 1:8 model of AMCA at Aero India 2013

The first scaled demonstration of a 1:8 scale model was unveiled at the 2013 edition of Aero India. The Project Definition and Preliminary Design phase was completed by February 2014 while Engineering Technology & Manufacturing Development phase begun in January 2014. By the time the first flight schedule was pushed back to 2018.

From November 2013 to December 2014, 9 design configurations of AMCA, starting from 3B-01 to 3B-09, were studied using CAD, low-speed and high-speed wind tunnel testing, and radar cross section testing at the Calspan Wind Tunnel. By the end of 2014, configuration 3B-09 was chosen. Also, the initial funding for feasibility studies were utilised and a further ₹4,000 crore (equivalent to ₹70 billion or US$750 million in 2026) funding was expected for 3 to 4 prototypes with a first flight target of 2020–21.

Meanwhile, the Indian Navy sought details of the project for a naval variant in March 2013. The proposed variant is referred to as NAMCA or AMCA-N. The naval requirements were officially sent on 7 September 2015 and the aircraft would equip their future IAC-2.

In Aero India 2015, the basic design configuration of AMCA was finalized. Major technologies under development at the time were stealth, thrust vectoring and super cruise. The design was accepted by IAF in 2016.

==== Detailed design phase ====
In 2018, ADA received additional funding of ₹447 crore (equivalent to ₹653 crore or US$70 million in 2026) for the detailed design phase (DDP). By 2019, the programme faced multiple delays while India pulled out from the Indo-Russian FGFA development project which was for a different weight category. AMCA became the "first preference" of the IAF.

As of 2022, after multiple delays, the Ministry of Defence was seeking approval of from the Cabinet Committee on Security (CCS) for the prototype development phase. Again, the timeline of first flight by 2020 (and production by 2025) was shifted to 2026.

==== Prototype development phase ====
The design work was completed in 2023, and the approval for the ₹15,803 crore (equivalent to ₹170 billion or US$1.8 billion in 2026) project for prototype development was received from the CCS in March 2024. The Defence Research and Development Organisation (DRDO) expects to "roll out the first prototype in three years and the first flight in one to one and (a) half years after that". A total of 5 prototypes are to be built. The first flight is expected in late 2028. The first three prototypes will carry out developmental flight trials, whereas the next two will focus on weapon trials. The prototype will be rolled out at an interval of 8-9 months. A Special Purpose Vehicle consisting of ADA, Hindustan Aeronautics Limited (HAL) and a private company was reportedly being formed for the development and production of AMCA.

At the Aero India 2025, a full-scale engineering model of the AMCA was publicly demonstrated for the first time. The model was manufactured by VEM Technologies, a private company based in Hyderabad. The firm was responsible for end-to-end manufacturing of composites along with assembly and integration of the entire body. As revealed during the event, ADA has laid out a 10-year development roadmap for the rollout of five prototypes after the full-scale engineering development phase began in April 2024. The prototype roll out is planned by late 2026 or early 2027, followed by first flight in 2028, certification by 2032 and induction in 2034. The timeline details was provided by Krishna Rajendra Neeli, the Project Director of the AMCA programme. Each prototype will cost ₹1,000 crore (US$110 million). The CCS mentioned that any cost overruns during the development should be reported directly to the CCS instead of the Defence Ministry.

In June 2026, it was reported that the full-scale engineering model by the VEM Technologies was spotted at the ORANGE Outdoor RCS Test Facility of the Research Centre Imarat (RCI) via satellite imagery. The facility is located at the Dundigal Air Force Station near Hyderabad and is used to assess an aircraft's stealth performance. However, the model does not reflect the current design configuration of the AMCA.

==== Production partner selection ====
Initially, a Special Purpose Vehicle (SPV) including ADA, Hindustan Aeronautics Limited (HAL) and a private company was expected as the development and production partner for AMCA. However, as of February 2025, the government was yet to decide the production partner for the aircraft with ADA proposing to select private sector companies over HAL in view of its "not-so-great delivery track-record". Multiple meetings were held where HAL proposed an additional assembly line dedicated to AMCA if required. However, the government had shifted to an "industry partnership model" instead of the initial plans for SPV. These changes were made to avoid any further delays following setbacks from development funding and lack of clearance from the US government for license production of engines. The private sector partner would be responsible for development, production and lifetime maintenance of the jet.

In March 2025, the Ministry of Defence formed a top level committee, chaired by the Defence Secretary, to evaluate a "clear-cut strategy and production-cum-business model" to accelerate the development of AMCA. The members of the committee are Secretary of Defence Production, Vice Chief of the Air Staff (VCAS) Air Marshal SP Dharkar and top officials from ADA and DRDO. The committee was tasked to devise a plan to "shrink timelines" to get AMCA from drawing board to air as well as the high thrust indigenous engine development. The report is expected to be submitted by April.

On 27 May 2025, the Defence Ministry cleared the "Advanced Medium Combat Aircraft Programme Execution Model" under which ADA would issue an Expression of Interest (EoI) to develop AMCA through industry partnership. Here, a private or public sector companies can bid either as independent entity, as consortia or in joint ventures for the contract. The prototype roll out is expected by 2028-29 followed by first flight in 2029 and service introduction by 2034 and series production by 2035.

On 18 June 2025, the EOI was issued by ADA meant to shortlist Indian companies for prototype development, prototyping, flight testing, and certification of the AMCA. The document invited 'reputed' Indian companies which are compliant with Indian laws and are experienced in the Aerospace and Defence sector. The bidder has to establish dedicated facilities for series production of the aircraft. The bidder has to complete the complete AMCA development cycle within eight years of signing the contract and should be capable of setting up a production line for serial production of AMCA independently. A pre-EOI meeting was scheduled for the first week of July while the deadline to respond was 16 August.

As per a report from 13 September 2025, multiple prospective competitors had expressed dissatisfaction with the eligibility criteria outlined in the EOI. One such criteria was revenue-to-order book ratio which ensures that a large share of aeronautical projects are not taken up by any single entity or to prevent monopolisation. HAL had written to ADA that this financial performance-related requirement is biased against the company and necessitates the formation of a consortium or a joint venture with a private firm to qualify. A company can be financially eligible to participate in the programme only if its order book is less than three times its revenue. However, the order book of HAL was eight times its revenue.

Meanwhile, private companies had argued that it was difficult to compete against HAL since the government has heavily invested in HAL's infrastructure over the years while they would have to develop everything from scratch. They also maintained that the technical parameters should be designed to enable equitable competition. The ministry, however, assured that most of the infrastructure necessary for the prototype development will be provided by ADA.

As per reports on 1 October, seven entities have responded to ADA's EOI and includes: —

1. On 24 September, Larsen & Toubro (L&T) and Bharat Electronics Limited (BEL) entered into a strategic partnership and the consortium is expected to submit its response for ADA's EoI notice. The consortium is expected to put together, L&T's expertise in developing strategic defence and aerospace platforms, and BEL's experience in defence electronics and systems. On 4 November, L&T announced that Dynamatic Technologies Limited (DTL) had joined their consortium.
2. On 26 September, Bharat Forge Limited (Kalyani Group), Data Patterns (India) Limited and BEML Limited signed a tripartite memorandum of understanding (MoU) to participate in the AMCA programme. The companies will have an individual stake of 50%, 20% and 30%, respectively, in the consortium. The partnership would reportedly bring together the strengths of each company which includes BFL's heavy engineering pedigree, BEML's system assembly and manufacturing presence, and Data Patterns’ strength in avionics and sensors.
3. Another MoU was signed by Goodluck India Limited, BrahMos Aerospace Thiruvananthapuram Limited (BATL) and Axiscades Technologies to submit their bid for the AMCA programme.
4. Tata Advanced Systems has independently bid for the programme.
5. The participation of Adani Defence & Aerospace in the programme has been confirmed by its CEO, Ashish Rajvanshi. MTAR Technologies have been reported to have formed a consortium with the Adani Group. As a precision engineering firm, MTAR has participated in multiple projects of ISRO and DRDO including Chandrayaan-2 and Mangalyaan as well as the development of Agni missiles.
6. Hindustan Aeronautics Limited (HAL) had released a tender outlining its requirement to select a private-sector firm to participate in the AMCA programme jointly as part of a consortium under the public–private partnership (PPP) model. By 21 September, HAL received responses from 28 companies and had formed a committee to shortlist two of them for the consortium. The committee is on the verge of submitting a report assessing the suitability of each interested company to form a consortium, based on factors including capability, technology, financial standing, and prior experience. While ADA's EoI limits the maximum number of partners in a consortium to three, HAL is expected to respond to the EoI with either one or two partners this week. As reported by the Business Standard, Mahindra Group and the Adani Group are the potential partners for HAL in the project.

The EOI marked the qualification stage. The deadline was extended twice, first to 31 August and then 30 September. As of 1 October, the bids would be evaluated by a committee headed by the former BrahMos Aerospace chief and DRDO missile scientist A. Sivathanu Pillai. This committee includes senior DRDO officials as members. Their report, based on technical and commercial evaluation of the bids, will be sent to another panel chaired by the Defence Secretary for further evaluation. Thereafter, the Ministry of Defence will issue the request for quotation to the qualifying entities within a month. The response of the firms to this will be evaluated before negotiating a contract with a firm for the final contract of five prototypes and a structural test specimen of the AMCA. The first flight of AMCA prototype is expected by 2029.

By 30 October, the shortlisting was expected within December. Meanwhile, the Request for Proposal (RFP) would be issued in January–March 2026 with the awarding of contract anticipated in January–March 2027. Additionally, prototype delivery and first flight is expected in 2027–28 and 2029–30, respectively.

==== Shortlisting and request for proposal ====
On 2 February 2026, the Defence Secretary announced that three contenders have been shortlisted for the programme. The RFP is expected to be issued within three months. Prototype roll out its expected within two to three years. The Economic Times and The Indian Express reported the consortia led by TASL, Bharat Forge and L&T to be the shortlisted in the project after their technical bids were evaluated. HAL, who had submitted its bid with two smaller companies, was eliminated. The shortlisted contenders will now submit their commercial bids. The contract will be awarded to the lowest bidder within three months.

Media reports also indicated that HAL had made a mistake in their bid offering, on certain parts of the evaluation criteria that was to be filled mandatorily were left blank. HAL did not respond to these issues. The firm can technically bid for the license production of the jet following prototype phase though the winning bidder will have better leverage. However, HAL has denied its disqualification by stating that the company had not received any communication regarding the same.

Defence Secretary Rajesh Kumar Singh announced on 12 May that the request for proposal would be issued by June. This will include detailed techno-commercial bids from the shortlisted industry teams for the development and production of the aircraft. The final decision is expected to be based on lowest-cost or L1 basis rather than a quality-and-cost-based system (QCBS). In the system, once the bidders qualify for some minimum technical requirement, the cost will be the deciding factor.

As per reports on 24 May, the RfPs are expected to be issued to the three firms by month-end since legal and technical terms have been finalised. The RfP was issued by 27 May. However, the original deadline of 27 August was extended to 30 October after the contenders sought additional time. As per the tender details, the selected production partner must complete first flight of the maiden prototype within 30 months of signing the contract while a cumulative 1,800 sorties through all the prototypes must be conducted within 84 months.

The bids were submitted by the shortlisted contenders to a high-level review committee constituted by the Ministry of Defence within the extended deadline. The bids would be opened on 31 October for the submission of documents to be verified followed by technical evaluation to select the development-cum-production partner (DcPP). The evaluation is expected to continue until December-end followed by price negotiation. The winning bidder must also have a manufacturing ecosystem near AMCA’s Core Integration & Flight Testing Centre at Puttaparthi.

By 16 November, defence officials have commenced bid evaluation for prototype production after the bids were opened on 1 November. The winner is expected to be declared within one month.

==== Prototype production ====
In May 2025, Chief Minister, Chandrababu Naidu, during a meeting with the Union Defence Minister, Rajnath Singh, pitched to move the defence aerospace manufacturing out of Karnataka. This was a part of a proposed defence industrial corridor in the state with five hubs, the third such attempt after Uttar Pradesh and Tamil Nadu. The plan included to transfer of a proposed 10,000 acres (40 km^{2}) land at the Lepakshi-Madakasira hub, an hour away from the Bengaluru Airport.

In early May 2026, reports indicated that the State Cabinet of Andhra Pradesh has cleared the free of cost transfer of 600 acres (2.4 km^{2}) of land in Puttaparthi Airport, Sri Sathya Sai district to the DRDO for the AMCA project. An ADA team had already conducted an inspection of the land parcel and had declared it suitable. The systems design, testing and assembly of AMCA prototype modules will be done at the Bengaluru-based facility of the ADA which will then be transferred to the new Andhra Pradesh facility which will host a dedicated flight testing complex, residential township for scientists and an assembly line. The site was chosen due to its "easier airstrip access" and "streamlined airspace coordination" according to officials cited by the report. The Government of Tamil Nadu had been in talks with the DRDO for the project to be based at Hosur Aerodrome since 2023. The state government would transfer 100 acres (0.40 km^{2}) of land for free. The location would be just 40 km (25 mi) from the ADA headquarters. Despite multiple favourable offers from Tamil Nadu, the site was shifted to Andhra Pradesh the reasons for which was not stated by the DRDO.

The proposal received formal approval from the state government on 7 May. A land of 350 acres would be allotted, including 150 acres adjoining the Puttaparthi Airport for the Aircraft Integration and Flight Testing Complex and another 200 acres for a satellite office complex and residential township for DRDO and ADA employees. The Union government would also extend the runway to 9,800 ft (3 km) length, establish a dedicated local flying zone at Puttaparthi and facilitate the setup of more advanced ATC tower systems, military navigation aids and meteorological support facilities within the state. In contrast, the runway extension at the Hosur Aerodrome was proposed at 11,000 ft (3.5 km). According to sources, the 3 km runway length might fall short for conducting flight tests like rejected takeoffs.

On 15 May, defence minister Rajnath Singh visited Andhra Pradesh and laid foundation stone for AMCA’s Core Integration & Flight Testing Centre at Puttaparthi along with chief minister Chandrababu Naidu. The facility spread across 650 acre, including 150 acre for the Flight Testing Centre and 300 acre earmarked for the private sector-led development partner, would cost around ₹2,000 crore (US$210 million). Groundbreaking ceremonies of several other facilities including Defence Energetics Facility (Agneyastra Energetics Limited, Kalyani Strategic Systems subsidiary) and the Ammunition & Electric Fuses Plant (HFCL Limited) at Madakasira, Sri Satya Sai district; a Drone City (consortium of eight drone companies) in Kurnool and a Naval Systems Manufacturing Facility (Bharat Dynamics) at T. Sirasapalli village in Anakapalli district among others.

The facility could be prepared within a year and the first flight for all the five prototypes is scheduled be completed by 2032. After validating the prototypes, the Indian Air Force would issue a larger tender to acquire production variants of the aircraft, which will witness larger industry participation as well as bids from contenders eliminated from prototype stage. However, the prototype development partners is expected to have an advantage for the larger order as well. The Ghatak programme could also use the same facility.

=== Engine development ===
==== Safran–GTRE engine co-development ====
In December 2014, ADA had plans to issue a request for proposal (RFP) to six original equipment manufacturers (OEM) by April 2015, for the co-development of an afterburning low-bypass turbofan of the 110 kN (25,000 lbf) thrust class. AMCA then had a requirement of 105 kN (24,000 lbf) thrust engines against its maximum MTOW of 24.2 tonnes. By February 2015, DRDO was expecting to finalise a partner within six months for the high thrust engine development. Meanwhile, Russia was collaborating for development of thrust vectoring. As per a statement by the Government in the Rajya Sabha during the Winter Session in 2021, there was a proposal to jointly develop the engine for AMCA with the help of foreign partner using the know how from the Kaveri engine development programme.

On 15 July 2023, India and France agreed to collaborate for the joint development of a combat aircraft engine, which would power the Mark 2 variant of AMCA as a part of the Horizon 2047 roadmap for India–France strategic partnership. A roadmap for this project would be prepared between French firm Safran and India's DRDO before the end of 2023.

As of September 2024, foreign firms who offered joint venture development included the US-origin General Electric, UK-origin Rolls-Royce and French-origin Safran. The latter two have also offered 100% intellectual property rights (IPR) of engine design. Safran and Rolls-Royce have also received clearance from their respective countries for the engine development. Reportedly, Safran is the frontrunner for the deal and are discussing the developments with ADA and GTRE as of October 2024. In October 2024, Safran and HAL also signed an MoU to develop industrial cooperation in forging parts’ manufacturing for commercial engines including those. HAL, in its Bangalore facility, would supply engine parts of CFM International LEAP to Safran Aircraft Engines.

On 18 February 2025, it was reported that while France was in an advanced stages of talks with India, Rolls-Royce Holdings was also in talks with India for the engine co-development programme for AMCA. They had offered "to co-develop and co-design, allowing India to own the IPR in India, for India for use in current as well as future programmes". They had completed the first phase of discussions for the development.

As of 11 July, DRDO, on behalf of its Gas Turbine Research Establishment (GTRE), is expected to submit a Cabinet note in view of selecting the development partner of the AMCA's engine from UK's Rolls-Royce or France's Safran, both of which have offered full IPR and technology transfer on the development programme. The procedure to float the Cabinet note is underway. Meanwhile, ADA has also released a request for information and a preliminary round of discussions have been held with "prospective players". Rolls-Royce has proposed for the development of a family of high-thrust engines for application on military transport aircraft and airliners and Safran has proposed to develop a prototype based on the existing Snecma M88 engine as well as boost the indigenous GTRE GTX-35VS Kaveri programme as one of its offset obligations. By 18 July, the Ministry of Defence officially recommended a strategic partnership with France to co-develop a next generation engines with a thrust of 120 kN (27,000 lbf). The recommendation was forwarded to the Government after a consultative process including feedback from stakeholders and a technical committee that went deep into all aspects of fighter jet engine manufacturing. This strategic project is worth ₹61,000 crore (equivalent to ₹630 billion or US$6.7 billion in 2026). Safran had earlier suggested a roadmap which would be synchronised with the developmental timeline of AMCA. As per estimates, India needs around 250 of these engines in the next decade.

On 22 August 2025, the Indian Defence Minister Rajnath Singh announced and confirmed that the engine for AMCA will be co-developed with Safran over a period of 10 years. The development will be a part of the Horizon 2047. The announcement will now be followed by final contract negotiations with the French company before the contract is signed. DRDO is now expected to approach the CCS for the design, development and produce the advanced jet engine in India with full technology transfer from Safran.

A total of nine prototypes will be developed over a span of 12 years. While the initial maximum thrust of the engines will be 120 kN, the same will be gradually uprated to 140 kN. The prototypes will be produced in India under Indian IPR with Safran transferring 100% technology to its Indian counterpart, GTRE. The technologies include key components like single crystal blade technology which is necessary for efficient and high endurance operations in high stress and heat conditions. Though this technology has been developed by DRDO's Defence Metallurgical Research Laboratory (DMRL), designing the same for a such high-thrust engines is a "different level of challenge". The engines will be manufactured through Development cum Production Partner programme.

On 16 February 2026, while reviewing the progress of various projects at GTRE, the defence minister announced that the National Aero Engine Mission has been initiated to develop a 120 kN-class indigenous fighter jet engine with France. Meanwhile, a joint study for the same is also being conducted between GTRE and the United Kingdom. On 3 August, the Hindustan Times reported that the Safran–GTRE joint venture has been documented as a proposal and was sent to the Cabinet Committee on Security (CCS) which is expected to clear the same by 15 August.

==== General Electric F414 ====
On 18 November 2023, the then DRDO chairman, Dr. Samir V. Kamat, announced that the United States had provided the necessary permits, allowing GE Aerospace and HAL to jointly produce the General Electric F414 engine in India for HAL Tejas Mark 2 and for the first two squadrons of AMCA. The commercial negotiations to acquire the F414 engines for the prototypes of AMCA are underway as of June 2026.

== Design ==
=== Overview ===
The AMCA is a twin-engine, stealth supersonic multi-role fighter jet designed for the IAF. The AMCA would be the first fifth generation fighter jet to enter service with the Indian Air Force.

The AMCA is designed with shoulder mounted diamond shaped trapezoidal wings, a profile with substantial area-ruling to reduce drag at transonic speeds, and a stabilator V-tail with large fuselage mounted tail-wing. Flight control surfaces include leading and trailing-edge flaps, ailerons, rudders on the canted vertical stabilizers, and all-moving tailplanes; these surfaces also serve as air brakes. The cockpit features a single seat configuration which is placed high, near the air intakes and wings of the aircraft to provide good visibility to the pilot with a single bubble canopy. A leading-edge root extension, which is a small fillet, is situated on the front section of the intake and wings of the aircraft. It has a typically roughly rectangular shape, running forward from the leading edge of the wing root to a point along the fuselage. The aircraft features a tricycle landing gear configuration. The weapons bay is placed on the underside of the fuselage between the nose and main landing gear. The AMCA is designed to produce a very small radar cross-section, to accomplish this it features "S-shaped" air-intakes to reduce radar exposure to the fan blade which increases stealth, uses an internal weapons bay and features the use of composites and other materials.

=== Stealth and radar signature ===
The AMCA design has inherent radar stealth, achieved through twin-tail layout, platform edge alignment and serration, body conformal antenna and low intercept radar, diverterless supersonic inlet with serpentine ducts which conceal engine fan blades, internal weapons bay and extensive use of composites in airframe. According to Janes Information Services quoting ADA, the airframe of AMCA will have 38–40% composite. As of October 2022, designers are still in the process of refining the radar deflection capability of AMCA. It will also use radar-absorbent materials wherever necessary.

On November 26, 2024, IIT Kanpur introduced Anālakṣhya, a Meta-material Surface Cloaking System (MSCS) for multi-spectral camouflage. The Meta-material Microwave Absorber improves stealth capabilities against synthetic-aperture radar imaging by wave absorption across a wide spectrum. From 2019 to 2024, it was tested in both lab and field settings under various circumstances. Meta Tattva Systems is the licensee of the technology for industrial production and is currently under acquisition by the Indian Armed Forces. This technology is of interest to DRDO for AMCA development.

=== Sensors and avionics ===
The AMCA is expected to have distributed passive sensors with artificial intelligence assisted multi-sensor data fusion to increase situational awareness and to work in tandem with the advanced electronic warfare suite onboard AMCA. The AMCA has a distributed processing system employing fast processors and smart subsystems. The AMCA will also have an integrated vehicle health monitoring system, an onboard condition monitoring system, which works on sensor fusion. Such development for the jet was first reported in 2011. The jet also features an "Electronic Piloting" which will enhance the decision-making capabilities of pilots. This will "enhance situational awareness, identify threats automatically, assist in complex combat scenarios".

During the Aero India 2025 in the month of February, ADA signed a memorandum of understanding (MoU) with Godrej and Boyce for the development of flight control actuators for the AMCA programme after their design is completed. The development of the actuators will include precision manufacturing, procurement of aerospace grade raw materials, assembly and testing, as well as development of test rigs for qualification tests. In September 2025, it was reported that Godrej received the technology transfer of stability actuators from DRDO.

=== Cockpit ===
The AMCA will have a glass cockpit equipped with a wide panoramic touchscreen display for enhanced man-machine interaction, a multi-function display (MFD) placed in portrait orientation and a wide-angle holographic head-up display. The AMCA will have hands-on throttle-and-stick arrangement with right hand on stick and left hand on throttle settings to ease the pilot workload.

The Large Area Display (LAD) for the pilot has been developed collaboratively by the DRDO and Data Patterns (India) Limited. Its development was completed by September 2025. The LAD is a high-resolution, wide-format display designed to consolidates mission data, sensor inputs, and flight information into a single interface. It will also integrate the AI-enabled Electronic Piloting features which will function as a virtual copilot.

=== Propulsion ===
The AMCA is to be powered by two afterburning turbofan engines. While AMCA Mark 1 will employ the General Electric F414 indigenously produced by Hindustan Aeronautics, a more powerful joint venture engine is planned for AMCA Mark 2.

=== Armament ===
The AMCA will feature an internal weapons bay for carrying missiles and standoff precision guided munitions in stealthy configuration, and also will be capable of mounting ordnance to external hardpoints for non-stealthy missions. Directed energy weapons are also planned to be equipped on the AMCA.

== Future operators ==
India

Indian Air Force – 7 squadrons planned (~126 aircraft)

== Specifications (projected) ==
Specifications can vary as the aircraft is still in development. All the information is based on available non-official sources - approximate and preliminary.

Data from Jane's All the World's Aircraft, The Hindu

General characteristics

- Crew: 1
- Length: 18 m (59 ft 1 in)
- Wingspan: 11.13 m (36 ft 6 in)
- Height: 4.5 m (14 ft 9 in)
- Wing area: 55 m^{2} (590 sq ft)
- Empty weight: 12,000 kg (26,455 lb) (estimated)
- Gross weight: 18,000 kg (39,683 lb)
- Max takeoff weight: 27,000 kg (59,525 lb)
- Fuel capacity: 6,500 kg (14,300 lb)
- Payload: 7,000 kg (15,000 lb) ― 1,500 kg (3,300 lb) internal weapons bay and 5,500 kg (12,100 lb) external stores
- Powerplant: 2 × Modified GE F414 (initial production) afterburning turbofan

Performance

- Maximum speed: 2,600 km/h (1,600 mph, 1,400 kn)
- Maximum speed: Mach 1.8
- Range: 3,240 km (2,010 mi, 1,750 nmi)
- Combat range: 1,620 km (1,010 mi, 870 nmi)
- Ferry range: 5,324 km (3,308 mi, 2,875 nmi)
- Service ceiling: 20,000 m (65,000 ft)

Armament

- Guns: 23 mm GSh-23 cannon
- Hardpoints: 14 (internal + external) with a capacity of around 7 tons (expected), with provisions to carry combinations of:
  - Missiles:
    - Air to air missiles
      - Astra IR
      - Astra Mark 1
      - Astra Mark 2
      - Astra Mark 3
      - NG-CCM
    - Air to ground missiles
      - BrahMos NG
      - Rudram
  - Bombs:
    - Laser-guided bomb
      - NG-LGB
    - Precision-guided munition
      - HSLD-100/250/450/500
      - Smart Anti-Airfield Weapon
      - DRDO Glide Bombs

Avionics

- Variant of LRDE Virupaksha Radar

== See also ==
- Fifth-generation jet fighter
- HAL HLFT-42
- Sukhoi/HAL FGFA (cancelled)
- HAL Tejas
- HAL Tejas Mk2
- HAL TEDBF
- HAL ORCA

Aircraft of comparable role, configuration, and era

- Lockheed Martin F-22 Raptor
- Lockheed Martin F-35 Lightning II
- Chengdu J-20
- Shenyang J-35
- Sukhoi Su-57

Related lists

- List of fighter aircraft
- List of active Indian military aircraft
