= General Electric F414 =

American afterburning turbofan engine

F414
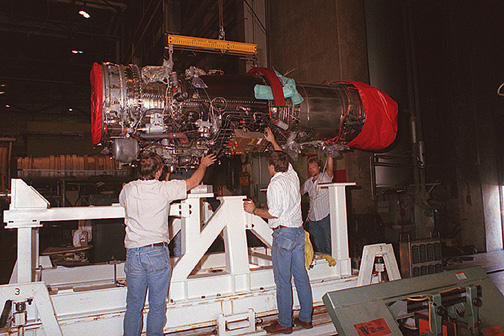
- Type: Turbofan
- National origin: United States
- Manufacturer: GE Aerospace
- First run: May 20, 1993
- Major applications: Boeing F/A-18E/F Super Hornet; HAL Tejas Mk2; KAI KF-21 Boramae; Saab JAS 39E/F Gripen
- Number built: >1,600
- Developed from: General Electric F404

The General Electric F414 is an American afterburning turbofan engine in the 22,000-pound (98 kN) thrust class produced by GE Aerospace (formerly GE Aviation). The F414 originated from GE's widely used F404 turbofan, enlarged and improved for use in the Boeing F/A-18E/F Super Hornet. The engine was developed from the F412 non-afterburning turbofan planned for the A-12 Avenger II, before it was canceled.

== Design and development ==
=== Origins ===
GE evolved the F404 into the F412-GE-400 non-afterburning turbofan for the McDonnell Douglas A-12 Avenger II. After the cancellation of the A-12 in 1991, the research was directed toward an engine for the F/A-18E/F Super Hornet. GE successfully pitched the F414 as a low-risk derivative of the F404, rather than a riskier new engine. The F414 engine was originally envisioned as not using any materials or processes not used in the F404, and was designed to fit in the same footprint as the F404.

The F414 uses the core and full-authority digital engine control (FADEC) from the F412, and the low-pressure system from the YF120 engine developed for the Advanced Tactical Fighter competition. One of the major differences between the F404 and the F414 is the fan section. The F414 fan is larger than that of the F404, but smaller than the F412 fan. The larger fan increases the engine airflow by 16%, is 5 inches (13 cm) longer, and increased diameter from 28 inches (71 cm) to 31 inches (79 cm). To keep the F414 in the same envelope, or space occupied in the airframe, as the F404, the afterburner section was shortened by 4 in (10 cm) and the combustor shortened by 1 in (2.5 cm). Also changed from the F404 is the construction of the first three stages of the high-pressure compressor which are blisks rather than separate discs and dovetailed blades, saving 50 pounds (23 kg) in weight. The F414 uses a "fueldraulic" system to control the area of the convergent-divergent nozzle in the afterburner section. The nozzle actuators use engine fuel whereas the F404 uses an engine hydraulic system. "Fueldraulic" actuators for afterburner nozzles have been used since the 1960s on the Pratt & Whitney J58 and Rolls-Royce Turbomeca Adour, for example. They are also used to swivel the VTOL nozzle for the Rolls-Royce LiftSystem.

=== Further development ===
The F414 continues to be improved, both through internal GE efforts and federally funded development programs. By 2006 GE had tested an Enhanced Durability Engine (EDE) with an advanced core. The EDE engine provided a 15% thrust increase or longer life without the thrust increase. It has a six-stage high-pressure compressor (down from 7 stages in the standard F414) and an advanced high-pressure turbine. The new compressor should be about 3% more efficient. The new high-pressure turbine uses new materials and a new way of delivering cooling air to the blades. These changes should increase the turbine temperature capability by about 150 °F (83 °C). The EDE is designed to have better foreign object damage resistance, and a reduced fuel burn rate.

The EDE program continued with the testing of an advanced two stage blade-disk or "blisk" fan. The first advanced fan was produced using traditional methods, but future blisk fans will be made using translational friction welding with the goal of reducing manufacturing costs. GE touts that this latest variant yields either a 20% increase in thrust or threefold increase in hot-section durability over the current F414. This version is called the Enhanced Performance Engine (EPE) and was partially funded through the federal Integrated High Performance Turbine Engine Technology (or IHPTET) program.

Other possible F414 improvements include efforts to reduce engine noise by using either mechanical or fluidic chevrons and efforts to reduce emissions with a new trapped vortex combustor. Chevrons would reduce engine noise by inducing mixing between the cooler, slower bypass air and the hotter, faster core exhaust air. Mechanical chevrons would come in the form of triangular cutouts (or extensions) at the end of the nozzle, resulting in a "sharktooth" pattern. Fluidic chevrons would operate by injecting differential air flows around the exhaust to achieve the same ends as the mechanical variety. A new combustor would likely aim to reduce emissions by burning a higher percentage of the oxygen, thereby reducing the amount of oxygen available to bond with nitrogen forming the pollutant NO_{x}.

As of 2009, the F414-EDE was being developed and tested, under a U.S. Navy contract for a reduced specific fuel consumption (SFC) demonstrator engine. In addition, General Electric has tested F414 engines equipped with a second low-pressure turbine stage made from ceramic matrix composites (CMC). The F414 represents the first successful use of a CMC in a rotating engine part. The tests proved CMCs are strong enough to endure the heat and rotational stress inside the turbine. The advantage CMC offers is a weight one third that of metal alloy and the ability to operate without cooling air, making the engine more aerodynamically efficient and fuel efficient. The new turbine is not yet ready for a production aircraft, however, as further design changes are needed to make it more robust.

As of 2023, over 1,600 F414 engines have been delivered.

=== India ===
==== 2008-12 ====
As of September 2008, the Aeronautical Development Agency (ADA), the designing agency of the Light Combat AIrcraft (LCA) project, was expected to issue a request for proposal (RFP) for the procurement of 95–100 kilonewtons (21,000–22,000 lbf) thrust-class engine to power the Tejas Mark 2. This was announced after the Kaveri program was to be officially delinked from both the LCA programs. The RFP were expected to be sent to Eurojet Turbo and General Electric for their EJ200 and F414, respectively. By September, both EJ200 and F414 were declared technically complaint for ADA's requirement, with Eurojet submitting a lower bid of $666 million than that of General Electric's $822 million as per initial commercial bids that was then submitted. But following two weeks of commercial negotiations, GE's bid was declared to be the lower one.

On 1 October 2010, John Flannery, President and CEO of GE India, announced that ADA had chosen the F414-GE-INS6, the highest thrust variant of the F414 engine, and would place an order for 99 units to power the LCA Mk2 project. While GE Aviation would supply the initial batch the latter batches would be locally produced in India under a transfer of technology agreement. This would be followed by further negotiations until at least mid-2011 before contract could be finalised. Moreover, GE would be given 121 days after negotiations to obtain necessary approvals for ToT from the US government. The announcement was done from Bengaluru, a week after the decision was finalised. However, Eurojet would remain a second choice in case GE fails to meet Indian needs like obtaining rights of technology transfer from the US, as said by Paul Herrmann, the consortium's Business Development Executive. As of 2012, the US allowed only 58% technology transfer for licensed production of the engines in India, excluding critical technologies.

==== 2023 ====
By 2023, 8 units of F414 has been delivered for the development of Tejas Mk2. By 19 June 2023, it was reported that the Biden Administration had completed all executive approvals for the deal of co-manufacturing of F414 engines with India. This would now be followed by a Memorandum of Understanding (MoU) between GE and Hindustan Aeronautics Limited (HAL) and notifying the US Congress of the deal. The executive approvals included permissions from commerce, state and defense departments. This coincided with the state visit of the Indian Prime Minister Narendra Modi to Washington, D.C. On 22 June, the MoU was signed between GE and HAL to co-produce the engines in India. GE Aerospace was also reported to be working on receiving export authorization from the US Government. The engine has also been selected for the prototype development, testing and certification of the HAL AMCA program.

On 28 July, the United States Department of State notified the agreement to the House of Representatives and the Senate Foreign Relations Committee. The agreement was approved by the United States Congress since no objection was raised by any Congressional representative or Senator. This marks the last clearance necessary from the legislative branch and implies that the Biden Administration could go ahead with the project. The program includes technology transfer, manufacturing of jet engines in India and licensing arrangements. The first batch of engines, with a high 80% ToT is to be delivered within three years of signing the contract, which is expected to be inked the same fiscal year.

On 18 November 2023, Dr. Samir V. Kamat of Defence Research and Development Organisation announced that the United States has provided the necessary permits, opening the door for GE Aerospace and Hindustan Aeronautics Limited (HAL) to jointly produce the General Electric F414 engine in India for HAL Tejas Mark 2, HAL TEDBF and HAL AMCA.

==== 2024 ====
As of August 2024, the deal for licensed production of the engines is expected to be signed in the next six months (i.e. end of FY2024-25) while General Electric Co. has submitted techno-commercial bids. The bid submission is to be followed by negotiations of technology transfer (ToT). The technology transfer pact is in final stages to be approved by the Government of India. The deal, estimated to be worth $1 billion, will lead to 80% technology transfer for the engines (22% higher than the agreement in 2012). Some of the critical technologies to be transferred includes coating for the hot end of the engine, crystal blades and laser drilling technology. The land to set up engine production plant has been chosen by HAL near the city of Bangalore. Meanwhile, environmental and pollution clearances for the project is being cleared. The facility will start production within two years of contract signing and delivery within three years of the same. While the initial production target of the engine is 99 units for Tejas Mk 2 program, which is subjected to grow. As of September 2024, the Indian Government is to form a negotiating committee for finalising the deal with representatives from the Ministry of Defence, HAL, ADA and Gas Turbine Research Establishment (GTRE). A majority of the workshare maybe outsourced to the private sector. On 24 September 2024, the Manufacturing License Agreement (MLA) and DSP-83 (Non-Transfer and Use Certificate), which are mandatory requirements for ToT, was signed by the Indian Defence Ministry, GE and other stakeholders as per reports. The deal negotiation is to start soon as of November 2024 and the contract is to be signed by mid-2025.

On 3 December 2024, HAL formed a Contract Negotiation Committee (CNC) and the negotiations are ongoing, with high-level visits taking place from both sides since then. As of 31 December, CNC discussions will proceed in 4 phases. As per a report, "Terms and conditions associated with the ToT including Technical Documentation, Technical Assistance, and Training are being discussed along with the terms and conditions associated with supplies including delivery schedule, statement of work, price escalation formula, warranty, option clause etc." The deal is expected to be signed by March 2025. The contract value is expected to be at $1 billion at 2023 Price Level and could be further negotiated.

==== 2025–26 ====
As of late January 2025, a team from HAL was scheduled to visit the United States to advance the negotiations and conclude the deal by March 2025. By February, final techno-commercial negotiations of the deal was underway. By June 2025, HAL Chairman stated that technical negotiations including the case for transfer of technologies for the F414 engines were concluded with commercial negotiations to commence shortly as of August 2025. The commercial negotiations is expected to be concluded within three months. The Chairman also announced that the deal with GE Aerospace would be sealed by March 2026. An Indian delegation is expected to visit the US late September to take part in the commercial negotiations.

On 12 April 2026, GE Aerospace and Hindustan reached an agreement on technical negotiations which is expected to be followed by commercial negotiations and signing of the final contract this year. The timeline of commercial negotiation will the affected by significant price escalations of components. The facility which will be established with the help of GE Aerospace is expected to take two years from contract signing.

The commercial negotiations are underway as of June 2026. The negotiation includes the engines required in the prototype stage of the Advanced Medium Combat Aircraft program. However, during the negotiations, GE increased the unit cost of engines threefold from the original quotes of under ₹80 crore (US$8.3 million). The AMCA project in the developmental stage requires 15 engines for five prototypes. The U.S. firm has also sought ₹6,000 crore (US$620 million) to set up a dedicated assembly and manufacturing line for F414 in India. A commercial proposal is still awaited as of September 2026 for the negotiation to commence.

== Variants ==
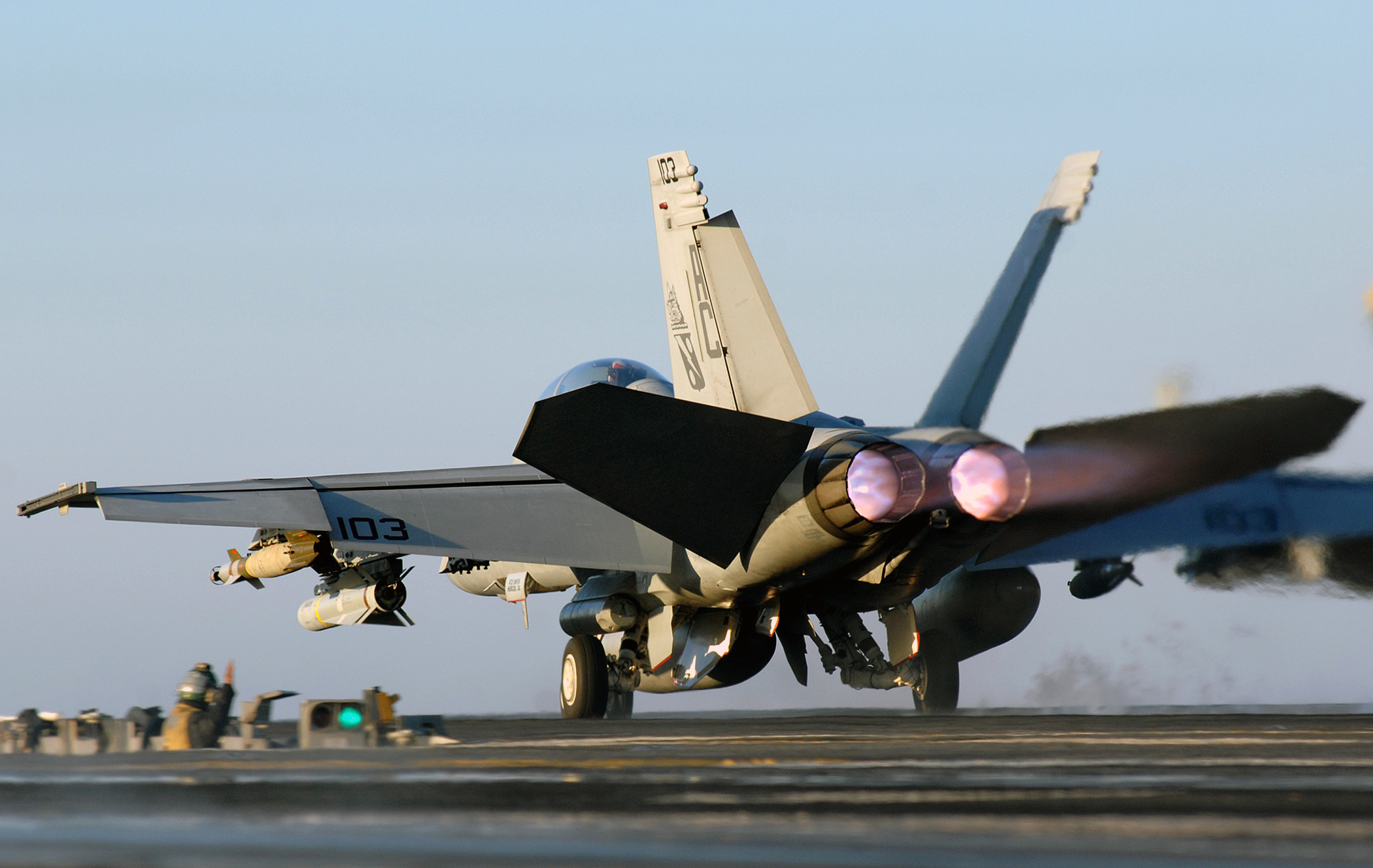
A F/A-18F Super Hornet, powered by the F414-GE-400

F414-GE-400
Version used for the Boeing F/A-18E/F Super Hornet. Also proposed for the unbuilt naval F-117N variant of the F-117 Nighthawk.

F414-EDE
"Enhanced Durability Engine" (EDE), includes an improved high-pressure turbine (HPT) and high-pressure compressor (HPC). The HPT is redesigned to withstand slightly higher temperatures and includes aerodynamic changes. The HPC has been redesigned to 6 stages, down from 7. These changes aimed at reducing SFC by 2% and component durability three times higher.

F414-EPE
"Enhanced Performance Engine" (EPE) or also marketed as "F414 Enhanced Engine", includes a new core and a redesigned fan and compressor. Offers up to a 20 percent thrust boost, increasing it to 26,400 lbf (117 kN), giving an almost 11:1 thrust/weight ratio.

F414M
Intended for the EADS Mako/HEAT. Derated thrust to 12,500 lbf (55.6 kN) dry and 16,850 lbf (75 kN) wet. Proposed for international versions of the Korean T-50 series of trainers and fighter aircraft, but later superseded by a new offer with a standard F414. However, the EADS Mako/HEAT trainer/fighter program was canceled before any were built.

F414-G
Produced for the Saab JAS 39 Gripen Demonstrator. Slightly modified for use in a single engine Gripen, instead of a twin-engine aircraft like the F/A-18. With it, the Gripen Demonstrator reached Mach 1.2 in supercruise (without afterburner).

F414BJ
Proposed version for the Dassault Falcon SSBJ. Would produce around 12,000 lbf (53 kN) of thrust without use of afterburner.

F414-GE-INS6
Variant selected for use on HAL Tejas Mk2. Proposed for HAL TEDBF and initial variants of the Advanced Medium Combat Aircraft.

F414-GE-39E (GE RM16)
New version of the F414G for the Saab JAS-39E/F Gripen.

F414-GE-400K
Variant of the F414-GE-400 co-developed by General Electric and Hanwha Aerospace for the South Korean KAI KF-21 Boramae, to be manufactured jointly and assembled locally in South Korea by Hanwha Aerospace.

F414-GE-100
A version custom made to drive NASA's X-59 Quiet SuperSonic Technology X-plane. Derived from the F414-GE-39E modifications include different control software, fuel piping and lack of mounting rails. Two units were made.

== Applications ==
- Boeing EA-18G Growler
- Boeing F/A-18E/F Super Hornet
- EADS Mako/HEAT
- HAL Tejas Mk2
- HAL TEDBF
- HAL AMCA
- KAI KF-21 Boramae
- Lockheed Martin X-59 QueSST
- Saab JAS 39E/F Gripen

== Specifications ==
=== F414-GE-400 ===
Data from GE Aviation, Deagal.com, and MTU Aero Engines

==== General characteristics ====
- Type: Afterburning turbofan
- Length: 154 in (391 cm)
- Diameter: 35 in (89 cm) overall, 31 in (79 cm) inlet
- Dry weight: 2,445 lb (1,110 kg) max weight

==== Components ====
- Compressor: axial compressor with 3 low-pressure stages and 7 high-pressure stages
- Combustors: annular
- Turbine: 1 low-pressure stage and 1 high-pressure stage

==== Performance ====
- Maximum thrust:
- 13,000 lbf (57.8 kN) military thrust
- 22,000 lbf (97.9 kN) with afterburner
- Overall pressure ratio: 30:1
- Bypass ratio: 0.25:1
- Air mass flow: 170 lb/s (77.1 kg/s)
- Specific fuel consumption: 23.9 g/kN⋅s (0.840 lb/HR/lb) (w/o afterburner); 49.3 g/kN⋅s (1.850 lb/HR/lb) (with afterburner)
- Thrust-to-weight ratio: 5.3 and 9 (with reheat)

== See also ==
Related development

- General Electric F404
- General Electric YF120
- Volvo RM12

Comparable engines

- Eurojet EJ200
- GTRE GTX-35VS Kaveri
- Guizhou WS-19
- Klimov RD-93
- Snecma M88

Related lists

- List of aircraft engines
