= HAL TEDBF =

Indian carrier-based multirole combat aircraft

Twin Engine Deck Based Fighter
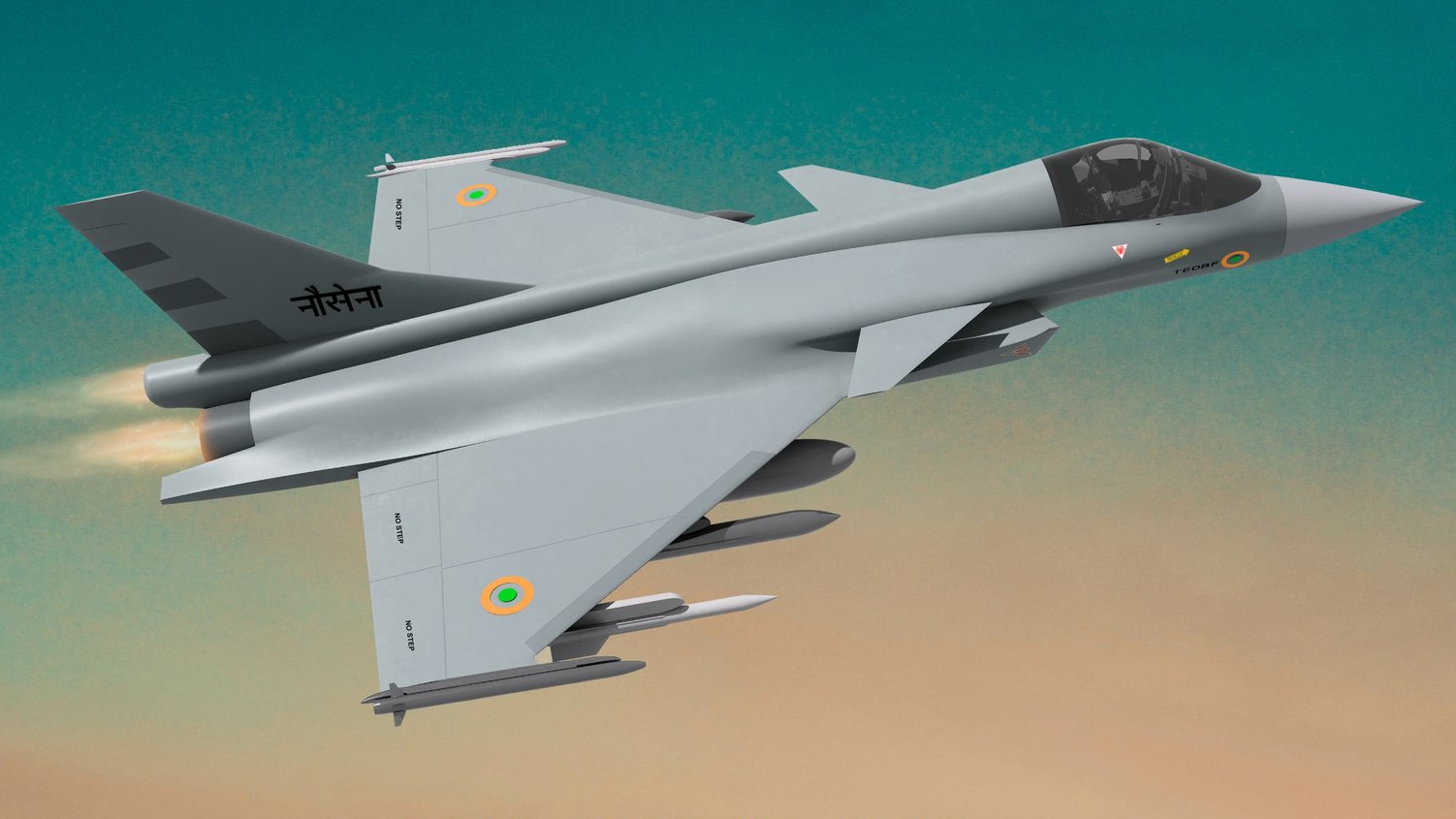
- HAL TEDBF design for Aero India 2025

General information
- Type: Carrier-based multirole combat aircraft
- National origin: India
- Manufacturer: Hindustan Aeronautics Limited
- Designer: Aeronautical Development Agency (ADA); Defence Research and Development Organisation (DRDO)
- Status: Under development
- Primary user: Indian Navy (intended)

History
- Introduction date: 2038 (expected)
- First flight: 2032 (expected)
- Developed from: HAL Tejas
- Variant: HAL ORCA (proposed Air Force variant)

The HAL Twin Engine Deck Based Fighter (TEDBF) is a canard delta wing, twin-engine, carrier-based, multirole combat aircraft currently under development for the Indian Navy. The TEDBF is being designed and developed by the Aeronautical Development Agency (ADA), and will be manufactured by Hindustan Aeronautics Limited (HAL).

As a maritime multirole fighter, the aircraft would be capable of missions like combat air patrol (CAP), air supremacy, interception, ground attack, anti-surface warfare (ASuW), reconnaissance, electronic warfare (EW) and buddy-buddy refuelling. The TEDBF is expected to replace the Mikoyan MiG-29K of the Indian Naval Air Arm and the future batch of Rafale's to operate from the Navy's STOBAR aircraft carriers. For ease of storage and operations from such platforms, the aircraft design will incorporate features including folding wings and arresting hook.

The programme was officially initiated in 2019–20, after the Indian Navy's dissatisfaction in operating a single-engine carrier-based fighter based on the HAL Tejas, and its eventual withdrawal from the naval LCA programme in 2016.

As of 2025, the preliminary design phase is nearing completion, and in April 2025, it was reported that the Indian Navy had deferred its deadline by approximately three years, with the first flight of the prototype expected between 2032. Series production and induction of the aircraft are expected by 2038.

== Development ==
=== Background ===
==== Naval LCA programme ====
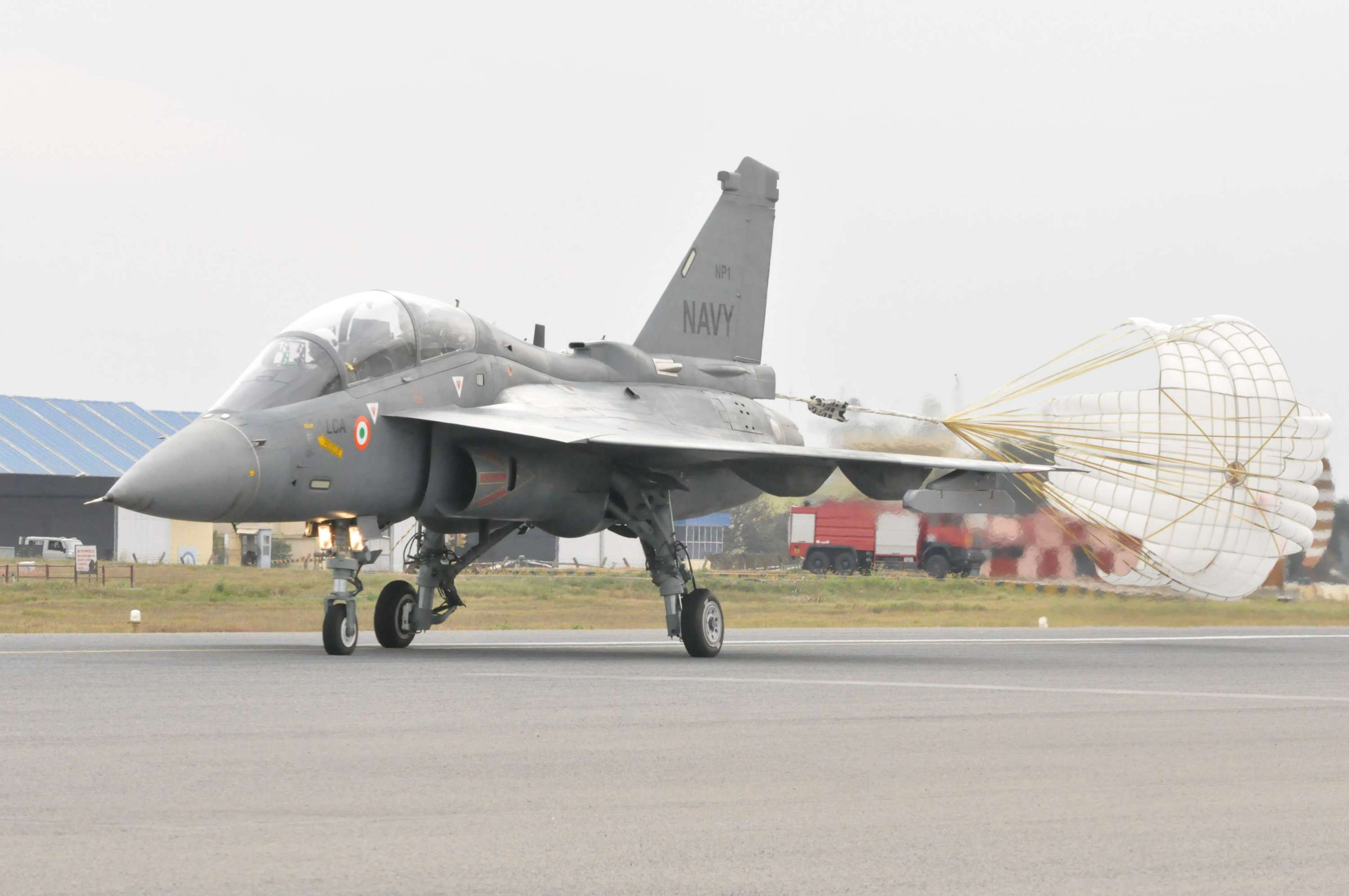
LCA Navy Prototype NP-1

The naval LCA programme to develop a carrier-based fighter for the Indian Navy was launched in 2003. The ADA was entrusted with the task of designing and developing a new naval fighter based on the existing Tejas template. The programme was envisaged to be completed in two phases - in the first phase, two prototypes were to be built, based on the Tejas Mk. 1 design. In the second phase, two more prototypes were to be built based on the Tejas Mk. 2 design. The programme was jointly funded by the Defence Research and Development Organisation (DRDO) and the Indian Navy, with the latter funding 40% and 60% of the developmental cost of naval LCA Mk. 1 and Mk. 2, respectively. In 2009, the Cabinet Committee on Security approved the development of Mk. 2 variant of the naval LCA. The first naval prototype, a two-seater NP-1, was rolled out in 2010, and first flew on 27 April 2012. By 2015, another naval LCA prototype, a single seater NP-2, had joined the programme, and carried out first ski jump assisted take off from a shore-based test facility (SBTF) in Goa.

==== MRCBF ====
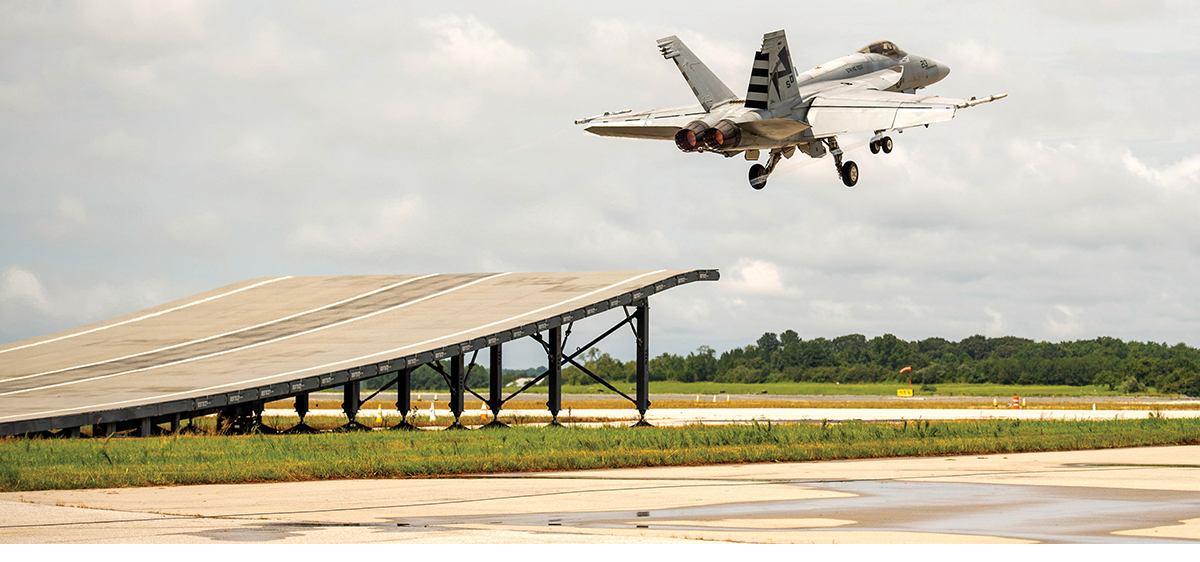
F/A-18E/F take-off from STBF facility during MRCBF trials

In December 2016, the Indian Navy opted out of the LCA programme completely, with the cited reason being that the naval variant was 'overweight', and issued a fresh RFI for the immediate procurement of 57 Multi-Role Carrier Borne Fighters (MRCBF).

The competition was between Rafale and the Boeing F/A-18E/F Super Hornet. Both the jets participated in the trials from the ski-jumps at the Shore-Based Test Facility (SBTF) at INS Hansa in January and June 2022 respectively.

By August 2022, the TEDBF development was underway and MRCBF was reported to be an "interim measure" until the TEDBF was ready for induction. The tender winner would form the Carrier Air Group of INS Vikrant. Further, MRCBF orders were reduced from 57 aircraft to 26, including trainer variants. By December 2022, the Indian Navy headquarters submitted a report to the ministry of defence where, reportedly, Rafale became the frontrunner.

In 2023, the Ministry of Defence approved the procurement of the Rafale-M for the Navy. As of April 2025, the deal for 26 Rafale-M has been signed during the visit of the French Defense Minister to India.

==== Naval LCA resurrection ====
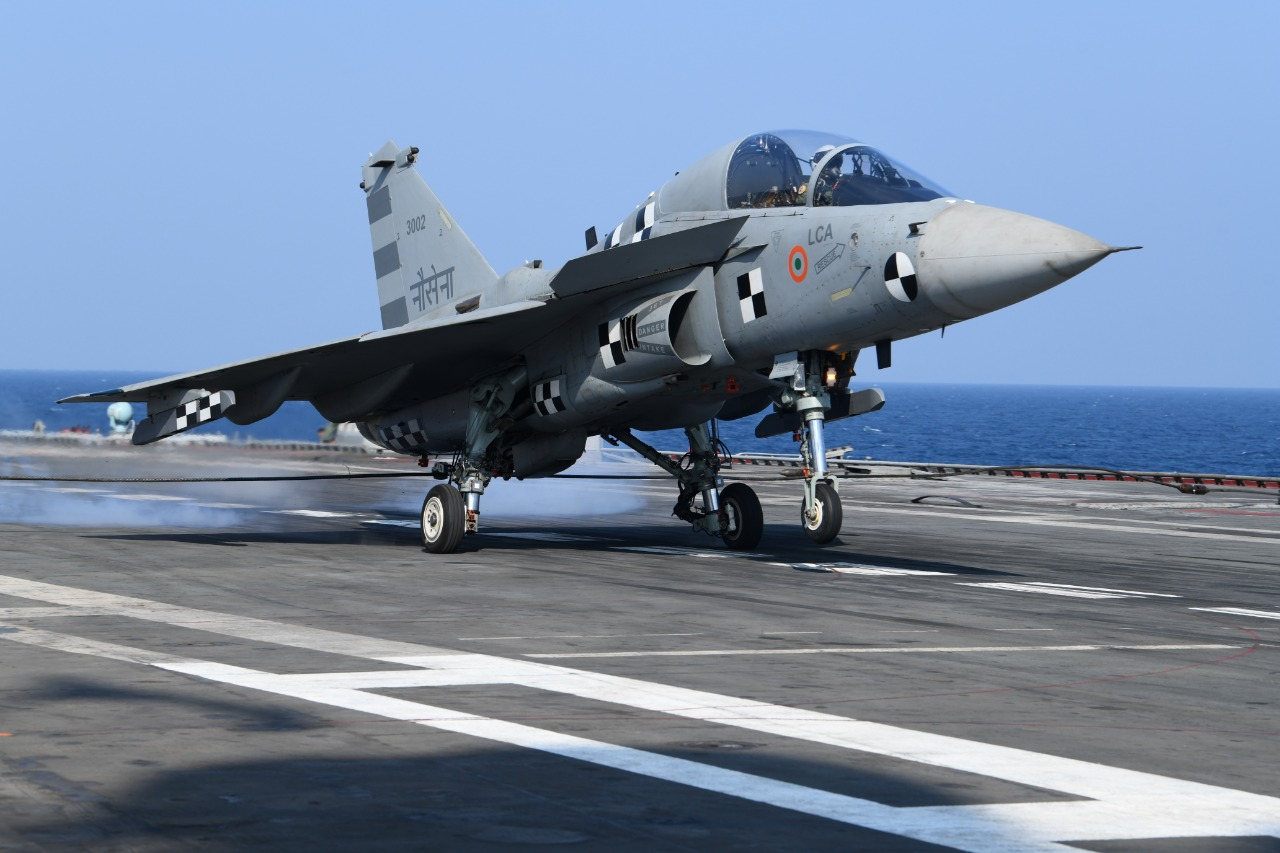
LCA Navy landing onboard INS Vikramaditya

The stalled LCA-N programme was revived once again in 2018, under the oversight of the then Minister of Defence, Nirmala Sitharaman. Simultaneously with MRCBF acquisition, the flight tests were resumed with NP-1 and NP-2 for attaining technological maturity of the carrier based fighter. By early 2020, the naval LCA had successfully carried out night-time arrested landing at the Goa SBTF, and carrier landing and take off on the aircraft carrier INS Vikramaditya.

=== Design and development ===
The existence of a twin-engine fighter concept on offer for the Indian Navy by the DRDO for development was first announced by the then Chief of Naval Staff Admiral Karambir Singh in early December 2019 during an annual press conference on the eve of Navy Day. As of then, the Qualitative Requirements (QR) were being prepared and the aircraft would be ready by 2026. He also said Naval LCA would function as a technology demonstrator and its carrier compatibility test results would be used for the development of the new aircraft. As of then, N-LCA completed 50 autonomous ski-jump take offs and 28 arrested landings from the Shore Based Test Facility (SBTF) at INS Hansa. TEDBF was slated for induction by 2032.

The development of Twin Engine Deck Based Fighter (TEDBF) was first reported by DRDO in April 2020. As per reported TEDBF would borrow many of the technologies from MWF programme like Next Generation Wide Area Display (WAD) and side-stick controls, high powered Digital Flight Control Computer (DFCC) and the sensor suite.

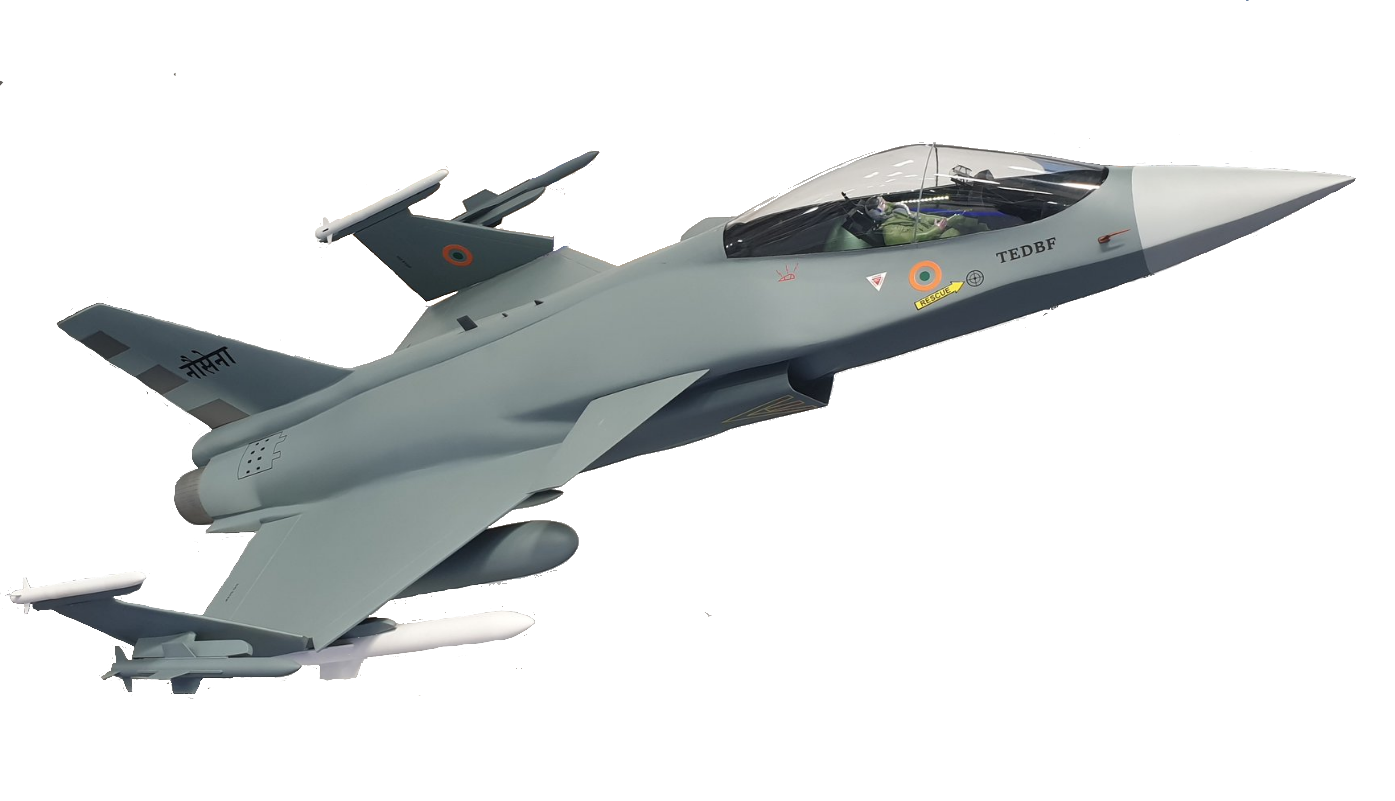
Model of TEDBF as displayed at Aero India 2021

A scaled down model of TEDBF was displayed for the first time in Aero India 2021. The TEDBF is being designed as per the requirements laid down by the Navy for the MRCBF acquisition programme.

According to Project Director TV Vinod Kumar, Project Director of LCA (Navy), the preliminary design phase of TEDBF is underway as of October 2022. It was estimated that after being cleared by the Cabinet Committee on Security (CCS), development of four prototypes will cost ₹14,000 crore (equivalent to ₹160 billion or US$1.7 billion in 2026). The aircraft will enter service in another eight years from CCS approval. Another variant of TEDBF for CATOBAR operations could also be developed in future if and when INS Vishal enters service.

Other ADA officials including P Thangavel, Project Director of LCA Mk1, reported in November that ADA will submit Preliminary Design Review by March 2023. Further, following CCS clearance expected in mid-2023, followed by roll out of first prototype in 1.5 to 2 years, first flight by 2026, flight trials completion by 2030-31 and induction by 2031–32. The prototype will take 1,000 flights during test phase. DRDO, as of then, was conducting high speed modelling in wind tunnels to test the supersonic characteristics using internal funds.

As of December 2024, the programme has received clearances from all relevant ministries and is being studied by National Security Council Secretariat (NSCS). The Navy had initially proposed for 145 TEDBFs based on the requirements of a three carrier force. However, defence planners have asked the Navy to reduce the count to 87 as per the requirements based on a two carrier force as of now. Meanwhile, the Navy and ADA plans to complete the first flight by 2028 while working on three prototypes through the development funds being sought from the Tejas Navy programme. The Navy has proposed 14 upgrades over existing features of Tejas Navy including automatic landing and take-off. Four of these upgrades has already been tested on Tejas. By the time initial quantity of purchase and design is being finalised, Navy-ADA have teamed up to prove these required technologies in order to reduce the developmental cycle time for the TEDBF.

A model of the aircraft with a revised design was displayed at Aero India 2025. As of March, the CCS has authorized for HAL to create the infrastructure required for the project. It was reported that the Preliminary Design Review (PDR) was to be completed by June 2025. According to Amitabh Saraf, Project Director of TEDBF, the PDR phase would be followed by Critical Design and Wind Tunnel Testing phase. It was also reported that the aircraft would be capable of refuelling four to five other aircraft mid-flight. As of April 2025, the first flight of the prototype is expected between 2029 and 2030, followed by series production and induction by 2038.

=== ORCA program ===
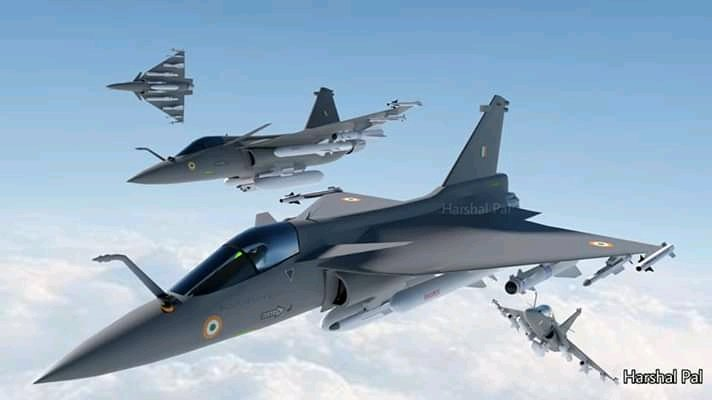
ORCA conceptual render

A proposed air force variant of the TEDBF design, called the Omni-Role Combat Aircraft (ORCA) weighing around 23 tonnes is also under study. The Indian Air Force is expected to need more than 750 aircraft between 2030 and 2050. ORCA, if funded, would be developed in parallel to the HAL AMCA.

In February 2026, The Week reported Indian Navy more looking to buy Rafale-Marine fighter jets.

== Operators ==
India

- Indian Naval Air Arm – 5-8 squadrons are planned (~ 87 to 145 units)

== Specifications ==
Data from Jane's, DRDO, The Week, India Today

General characteristics

- Crew: 1
- Length: 16.3 m (53 ft 6 in)
- Wingspan: 11.2 m (36 ft 9 in) (unfolded), 7.6 m (25 ft) (folded)
- Empty weight: 14,000 kg (30,865 lb)
- Max takeoff weight: 26,000 kg (57,320 lb) (expected)
- Fuel capacity: 7,000 kg (15,000 lb)
- Payload: 9,000 kg (20,000 lb) of weapons payload
- Powerplant: 2 × General Electric F414 afterburning turbofan, 58.5 kN (13,200 lbf) thrust each dry, 98 kN (22,000 lbf) with afterburner

Performance

- Maximum speed: Mach 1.8
- Range: 2,000 km (1,200 mi, 1,100 nmi) (expected; at least)
- Combat range: 800–900 km (500–560 mi, 430–490 nmi)
- Service ceiling: 18,000 m (60,000 ft)
- g limits: +9/−3

Armament

- Hardpoints: 13 (2 × wing tip, 8 × under-wing, and 3 × under-fuselage), with a capacity of 9,000 kg , with provisions to carry combinations of:
  - Missiles:
    - Air-to-air missile:
      - ASRAAM (planned)
      - Astra series (planned)
    - Anti-ship missile:
      - BrahMos-NG (planned)
      - NASM-MR (planned)
      - Harpoon (planned)
    - Anti-radiation missile:
      - Rudram-1 (planned)

Avionics

- LRDE Uttam AESA Radar (planned)
- Infrared search and track (IRST) system (planned)

== See also ==
- Fourth-generation jet fighter
- HAL AMCA

Related development

- HAL Tejas
- HAL Tejas Mk2

Related lists

- List of fighter aircraft
- List of active Indian military aircraft
