= Uttam AESA Radar =

India's indigenous AI AESA Radar programme

Uttam
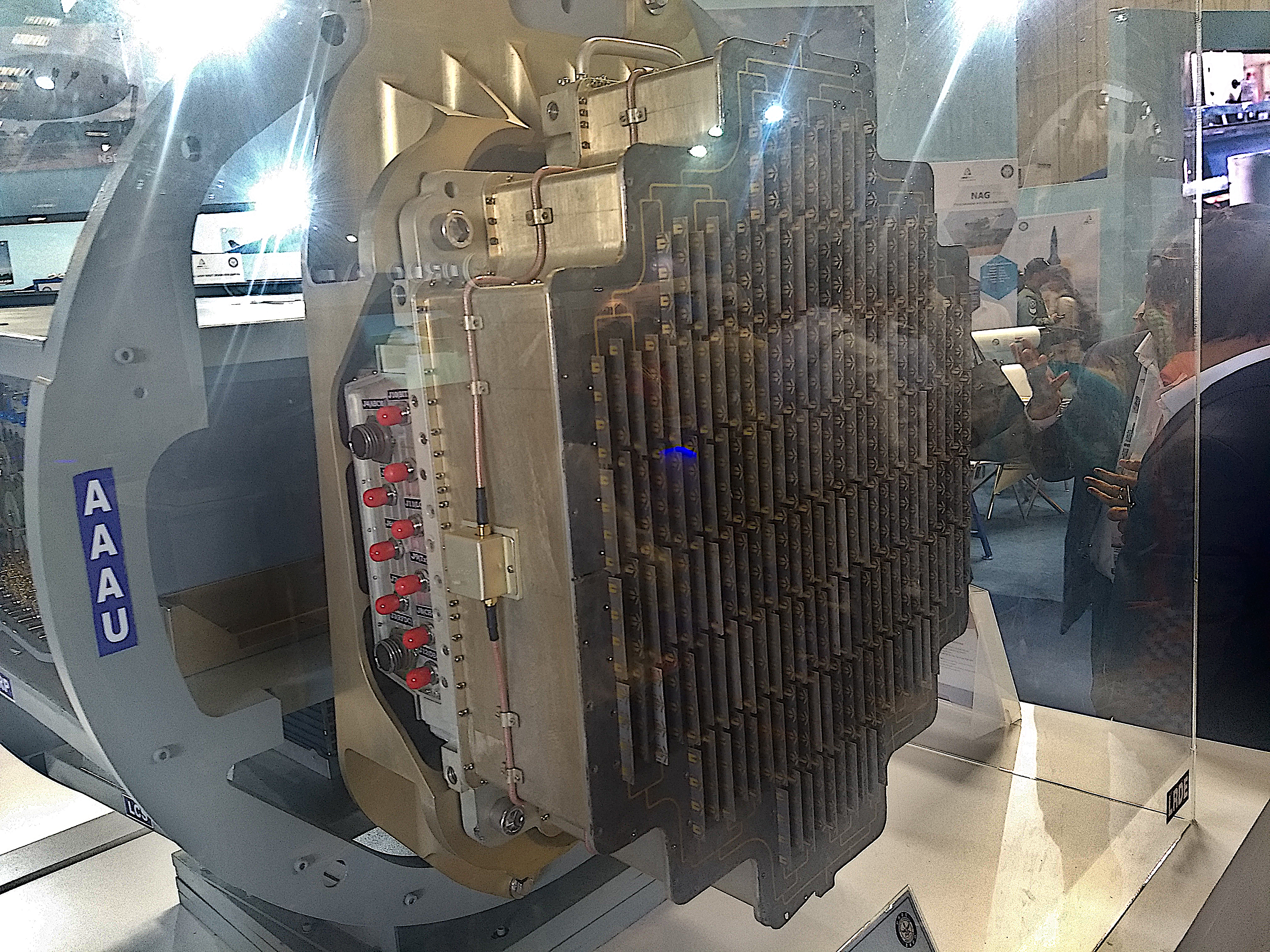
- Uttam AESA radar displayed at Aero India 2019
- Country of origin: India
- Manufacturer: Bharat Electronics; Hindustan Aeronautics Limited
- Designer: Electronics and Radar Development Establishment
- Introduced: In development
- Type: Solid-state AESA
- Frequency: X Band
- Power: 9.12 kW

Uttam (lit. 'Excellent') is a solid-state gallium arsenide (GaAs) based AESA radar under development by the Electronics and Radar Development Establishment, a laboratory of the Indian Defence Research and Development Organisation. It is an LPI (Low Probability of Intercept) liquid cooled AESA radar featuring quad-band modules that can be stacked to form a larger unit. The Uttam Mk-1 has a total of 912 TRMs.

== Development ==
The project was initiated in 2008, and the development began in 2012. Its full-scale model was displayed at the 2017 Aero India air show and aviation exhibition. People who worked for DRDO AEW&CS's main radar and Maritime Patrol Radar were part of the project team. A fully functional active electronically scanned array (AESA) radar prototype was unveiled at Aero India 2019, the prototype was mounted inside the glass nose of a HAL Tejas prototype.

Hindustan Aeronautics Limited is the lead integrator and Bharat Electronics is the major supplier of subsystems. As per Project director D Seshagiri of the Electronics and Radar Development Establishment, Uttam AESA radar is 95% indigenous, with only one imported subsystem. The National Flight Testing Centre had evaluated the radar and cleared it after performance tests. The integration problem of Astra BVRAAM due to older generation of radars will also be solved by Uttam.

During Aero India 2021, there was a licensing agreements for technology transfer from DRDO to Hindustan Aeronautics Limited for manufacturing and integration of the Uttam in the Mark 1A variant of the HAL Tejas. The technology transfer to HAL was finished by DRDO in July 2023, and the radar was approved for export as well.

HAL placed an order for 122 Active Antenna Array Units and 121 Interface Frames for the Uttam Radar with Astra Microwave Products Limited on 31 July 2026, for ₹2,205 crore (US$230 million). According to reports, the second batch of 97 Tejas Mk1A aircraft would be equipped with the radar. Astra Microwave plans to finish the delivery by 2031.

== Testing ==
As of 2021, three units were in various phases of testing. The Uttam radar has completed 230 hours of airborne testing onboard two Tejas fighter jets (LSP2 and LSP3) and on an executive jet; presumed to be DRDO's Dornier 228 "Nabhratna" used as a flying test bed by LRDE. Once fully validated and certified, it is planned is to introduce the radar in later batches of Tejas Mark 1A aircraft. The Uttam radar will be used with DRDO's Unified Electronic Warfare suite. Indian Air Force Test Pilot School would start final demonstration trial of Uttam AESA radar from December 2021 and if successful will be sent for serial production. LRDE has completed 250 hours of performance testing on two Tejas fighters as well as Hawker 800 executive jet.

The flight evaluation of the radar aboard Tejas Mark 1 is over, and the Uttam radar has successfully completed flight testing in all modes. In 2023, an updated Uttam radar was developed and placed on Limited Series Production aircraft in order to satisfy Tejas Mark 1A requirements. The Uttam radar was modified with an Active Array Antenna Unit and flight tested in Air to Air mode of operation for maximum range in July 2023.

As of April 2024, the radar has completed 125 test sorties onboard Tejas Mk 1 prototypes as per ADA Director Jitendra Jadhav. The radar has cleared testing Air to Air (A2A) and Air to Ground (A2G) modes while few more tests are yet to be conducted. The performance of the radar is on par with other proven designs like EL/M-2052. In April 2025, Centre for Military Airworthiness and Certification informed HAL and DRDO internally that the Uttam radar had finished four stages of flight testing. Furthermore, the radar hardware has passed qualification tests in accordance with the specifications of the Tejas Mark 1A. CEMILAC suggested that construction of the radar subsystems be started in order to facilitate the induction of the radar, with the principal system integrator being Hyderabad based HAL's avionics division.

== Features ==
- Full solid-state (electronics) radar, based on GaAs
- High MTBCF (redundancy)
- Range: >150 km
- Multi Target Tracking (50 Targets), Priority Tracking (4 Targets).
- Simultaneous operation modes.
- Solid-state, active phased array technology
- Pulse Doppler, all aspect, shoot down capabilities
- Simultaneous multi-target tracking and engaging
- Simultaneous multi-mode operation
- High ECM immunity
- Electronic counter-countermeasure
- Ultra-low side-lobe antenna
- Flexible interfaces allowing scalable design.
- Modular hardware and software
- Fast-beam agile system
- Quad band TRM modules pack
- High mission reliability (built with redundancy)
- IFF modes.
- C-band LOS, Ku band satcom link.

== Operational Modes ==
Uttam AESA radar has a total of 18 modes in Air to Air, Air to Ground and Air to Sea roles. The modes have been validated on-board a business jet and further proofing is being done on HAL Tejas to validate the same on supersonic platform.

- Air-to-Air
  - TWS/Multi-target detection and tracking
  - Multi-target ACM
  - High resolution raid assessment
- Air-to-Ground
  - High resolution imaging (SAR Mode)
  - High resolution tracking (SAR Mode)
  - AGR – Air-to-Ground Ranging
  - RBM – Real Beam Map
  - DBS – Doppler Beam Sharpening
  - GMTI on RBM, SAR
  - Weather
- Air-to-Sea
  - High resolution imaging (SAR Mode)
  - High resolution tracking (SAR Mode)
  - Sea search and multi-target tracking
  - RS and ISAR classification modes.

== Virupaaksha ==
Virupaaksha radar is an advanced version of the Uttam Mk-II radar. The radar under development will replace the current N011M Bars radar being used onboard the Sukhoi Su-30MKI after the Super Sukhoi upgrade program. Virupaaksha weighs half as much as the N011M Bars. The LRDE was working on the project, but got approval in October 2024. LRDE plans to set up "assembly jigs" to begin ground testing soon. These will be delivered within 16 weeks of the contract’s approval. The assembly will be completed within 15 weeks while the last week will be reserved for acceptance testing.

Virupaaksha utilises Gallium Nitride (GaN) technology with improved radar operational characteristics than Gallium Arsenide (GaAs) used by earlier variants. GaN provides better power output, enhanced thermal efficiency, wider bandwidth of operation, and a longer lifespan compared to earlier variants. The radar incorporates the quad transmit-receive modules (T/R modules) similar to Uttam but has a more densely packed configuration and has around 2400 modules based on GaN based planks. The plank configuration eases maintenance operations. Reportedly, the radar succeeded to track 64 to 100 aerial targets simultaneously during trials and offers at least 1.7 times increased head-on search range over the 140 km-range N011M Bars radar. It features advanced electronic counter-countermeasures (ECCM).

The Virupaksha radar operates in the S-band frequency range, and can detect and track a wide range of targets like aircraft, helicopters, drones, and even ballistic missiles. It has a reported head-on search range of over 400 km, though the value is officially classified. In air-to-air attack mode, Virupaaksha can maneuver, control, and direct six missiles simultaneously towards the target. It also features electronic steering, also present on Captor-E of the Eurofighter Typhoon, allowing a higher angle of view.

The radar consists of eight Line Replaceable Units (LRUs) which includes :

1. Active Array Antenna Unit
2. Exciter Unit
3. Radar Receiver Unit
4. Antenna Positioner
5. Radar Processing Unit
6. Cooling Unit
7. Radome
8. Antenna Power Supply Unit

The DRDO is yet to select the Development and Production Partner (DcPP) for the programme. The DcPP will be responsible to build a complete industrial ecosystem to supply the radars and must be equipped with skilled manpower, advanced infrastructure, and certified quality systems. The industrial partner will oversee integration, flight validation, and large-scale production of the radars along with its post-deployment support for 20 years. This mode of development will see the programme responsibility shifting towards the industry.

The programme, after DcPP selection, will proceed in four phases. The first phase will span for 16 months and will include hardware realisation as well as designing of Ground Support and Automated Test Equipment. This will be immediately followed by a 15 month-long integration phase and 9 month-long flight trials for the radar's in-flight performance validation. The fourth and final stage will see the commencement of serial production within a two month window, after production clearance and the transfer of non-exclusive production license. Initially, LRDE is expected to deliver three radars for evaluation.

The IAF plans to upgrade 84 Su-30MKIs with this radar in the first phase from 2026.

According to IAF Chief Air Chief Marshal AP Singh, over 200 of Su-30MKIs shall be upgraded to the Super Sukhoi standard with the Virupaksha radar.

== Applications ==
The fighter jet platforms that have been integrated with Uttam radar or are planned to be integrated are as follows:

Status of Radar Integration/Testing
Aircraft / Platform	Status	Notes	References
HAL Tejas Mk1/1A	Testing phase; Integrated on LSP 2 and 3	Completed 125 developmental flights.	
Hawker 800	Testing phase	Flight testbed configuration.	
HAL Tejas Mk 2	More capable version planned	"Angad", "Uttam" to replace imported systems.	
Sukhoi Su-30MKI	Planned from 2025	During the Super Sukhoi upgrade, the present PESA Bars radar will be replaced by the Virupaaksha radar. In the first phase, 84 units would be upgraded by Hindustan Aeronautics Limited (HAL) in India, which would later increase to 200+ aircraft.	
Mikoyan MiG-29UPG/Mikoyan MiG-29K	Planned from 2025		
HAL TEDBF	Planned		
HAL AMCA	Virupaaksha variant planned		

== Gallery ==
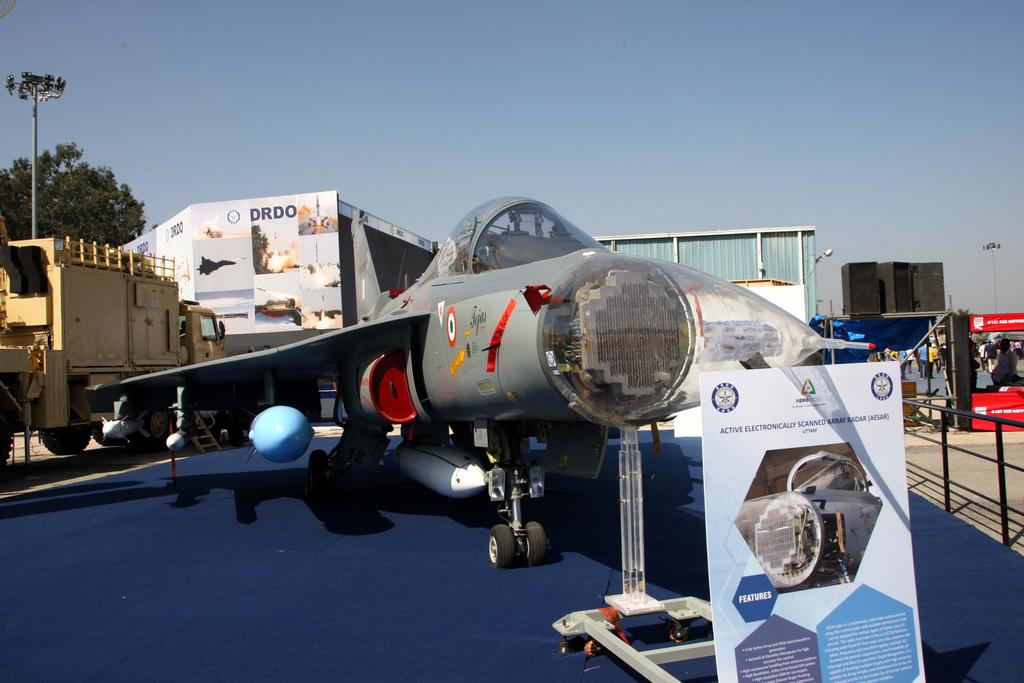
Uttam AESA Radar integrated in LCA Tejas showcased during Aero India 2019.

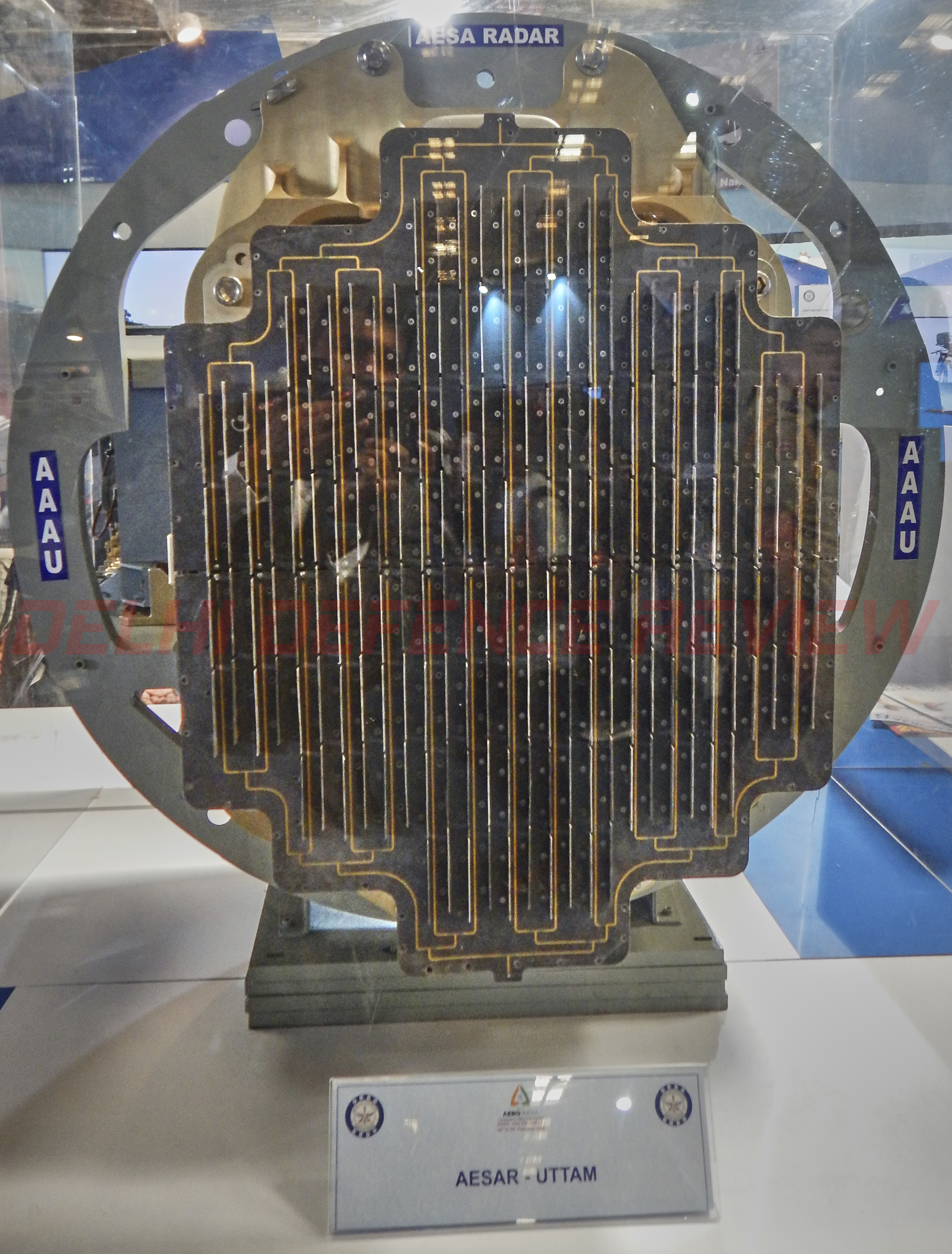
Uttam AESA radar on display at Aero India 2019

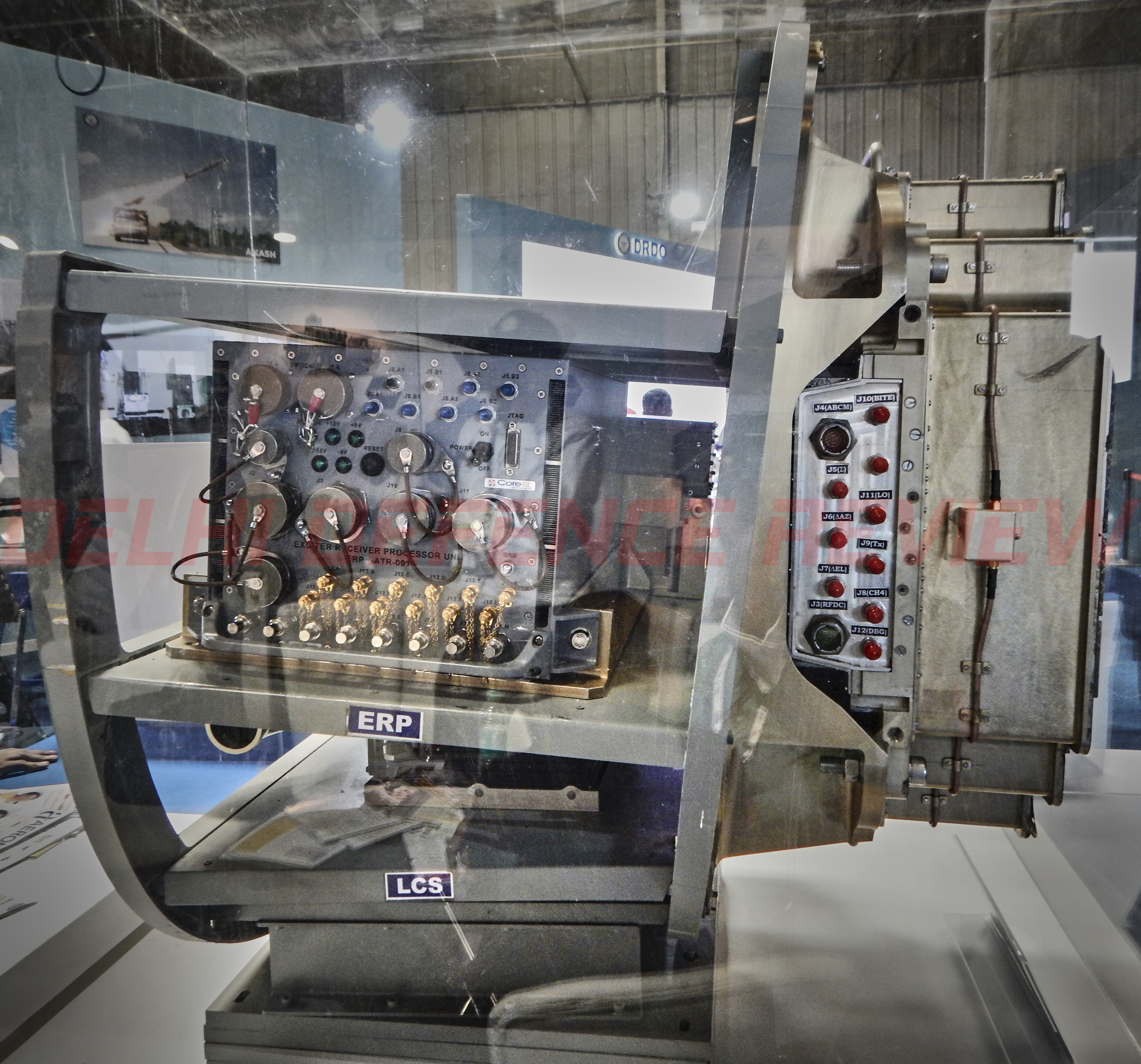
Side profile of Uttam AESAR.

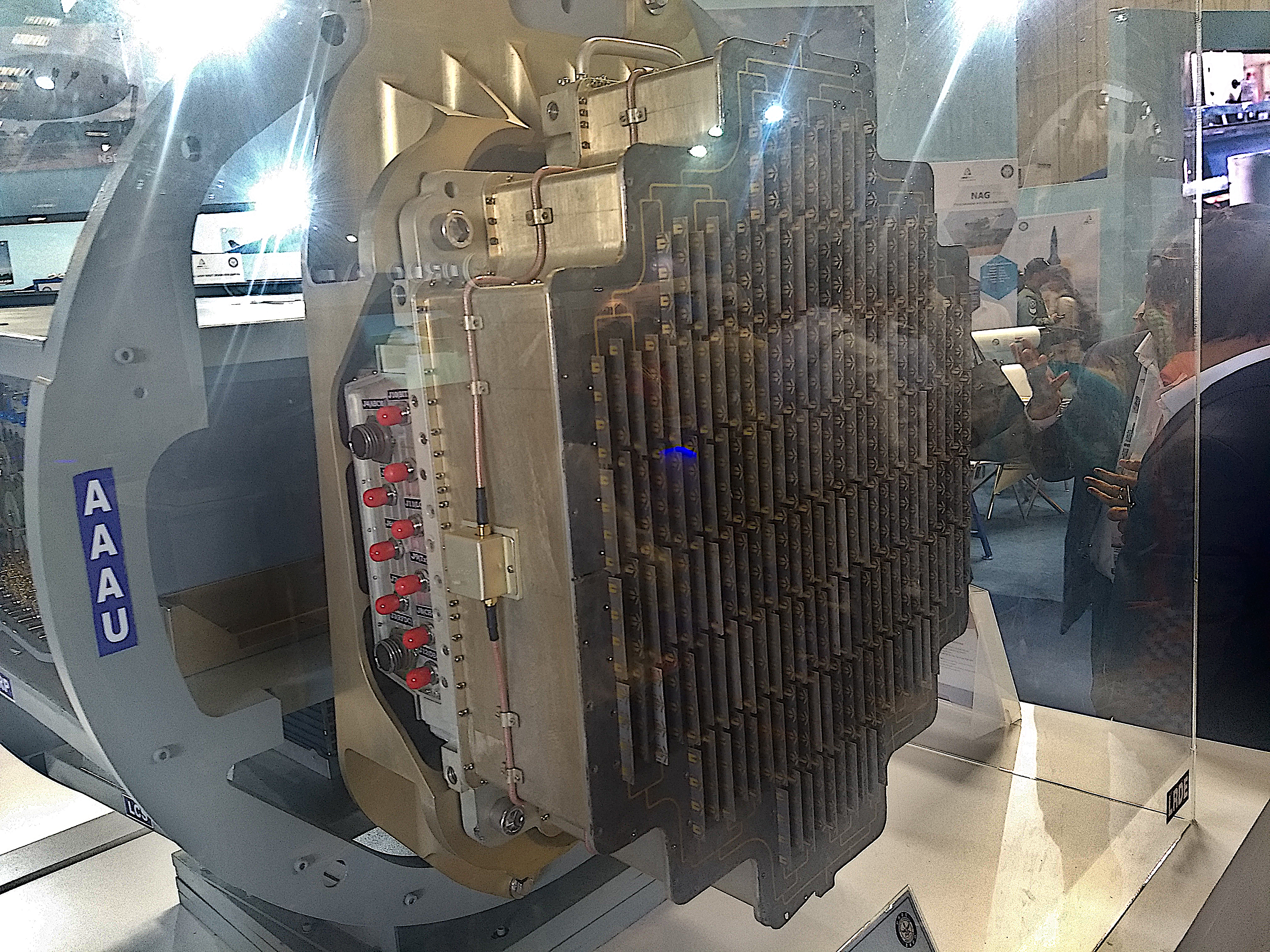
The Active Antenna Array Unit (AAAU) of Uttam AESA radar on static display at Aero India, 2019

== See also ==
- HAL Tejas
- HAL Tejas Mark 2
- HAL TEDBF
- HAL AMCA
- DRDO AEW&CS
- Phased array
- Active electronically scanned array
