= Combat Aircraft Systems Development & Integration Centre =

Indian national defence laboratory

- Established: 1986
- Director: CH Durga Prasad
- Location: Bangalore, Karnataka, India
- Operating agency: Defence Research and Development Organisation
- Website: CASDIC official website

The Combat Aircraft Systems Development & Integration Centre (CASDIC) is a laboratory of the Indian Defence Research and Development Organisation (DRDO). Located in Bangalore, Karnataka, India, it is one of the two DRDO laboratories involved in the research and development of airborne electronic warfare and mission avionics systems.

== History ==
The organisation was established in 1986 as a Project Laboratory, then named "Advanced Systems Integration and Evaluation Organisation" (ASIEO). Dr. K. G. Narayanan headed ASIEO from its inception till 2002. The founding members of ASIEO were R.P Ramalingam , S Bimalkhedkar, Gp Capt (Retd) D.Venkateswarlu, V Desikan , Wg Cdr (Retd) Anil Kaistha and CV Krishna rao.

On 1 June 2001, ASIEO became a full-fledged Defence Research and Development Organisation (DRDO) laboratory and was renamed as the Defence Avionics Research Establishment (DARE).

Combat Aircraft Systems Development & Integration Centre (CASDIC), previously known as Defence Avionics Research Establishment (DARE), is placed as a Self-Accounting Unit under administrative control of the Defence Electronics Research Laboratory (DLRL), Hyderabad on 1 Apr 2021. The current director of CASDIC is CH Durga Prasad.

In 2021, CASDIC was part of a group of Indian research and development (R&D) agencies and organisations that developed the critical avionic line-replaceable units (LRUs) for the HAL Tejas. As of 2024, CASDIC is also working on the Super Sukhoi upgrade programme for the Indian Air Force's Sukhoi Su-30MKI fleet.

== Areas of work ==
CASDIC has rich experience in developing internal and pod based electronic warfare (EW) systems for combat platforms, sensor integration and cooling systems development. It is one of the two laboratories of DRDO that works on electronic warfare systems, along with the Defence Electronics Research Laboratory.

== Products ==
=== Airborne radar warning and ESM systems ===
Survivability of military aircraft in the modern combat scenario of sophisticated air defence weapon systems is of paramount importance. This can only be achieved by equipping them with electronic armor consisting of advanced EW Systems. DARE has developed a range of state-of-the art EW suites for military aircraft. Systems developed include versatile Radar warning receivers (RWR), podded jammers and integrated EW suites. These systems have added electronic teeth to the carrier platforms.

==== D-29 EW System ====
D-29 is an integrated EW system for Radar warning and jamming that encompasses RWR, ECM, ESM functions and utilizes state-of-the-art active phased arrays for selectively jamming the multiple threat radars for use onboard Indian Mikoyan MiG-29s. The D-29 system serves primarily as a self-protection jammer that will boost survivability, enhance situation awareness and increase mission effectiveness.

D-29 system detects and gives the information about the position of the RF sources illuminating the aircraft and applies the appropriate jamming technique. The system mainly consists of Unified Receiver Exciter Processor (UREP modified to suit the requirements of D-29), Solid State Transmit / Receive Unit (SSTRU) with Active Array Unit (AAU) and a liquid cooling system.

D-29 System has completed flight evaluation from users for ground and airborne emitters in Nashik and Gwalior. The system performance has been satisfactory. Modification of all 06 aircraft has been completed for the installation of D-29 system.

==== Swayam Raksha Kavach EW System ====
CASDIC and Defense Electronics Research Laboratory worked together to jointly design and develop the SRK EW package. The project was initiated in 2021. It consists of the Advanced Self Protection Jammer (ASPJ) pod and the Dhruti DR118 RWR. It is designed to function with the Uttam AESA Radar. With enhanced capabilities, the SRK suite is an evolution of the D-29 EW System, which was developed for use on Mikoyan MiG-29 aircraft. With the Dhruti DR118 RWR's four wideband receiver channels and the ASPJ pod's digital radio frequency memory technology, the SRK EW suite offers 360-degree radar warning coverage and can process more than a million pulses per second, offering complete defense against electronic warfare threats.

The Tejas LSP-3 (KH2013) aircraft was used to test the SRK EW suite for an integrated mode of operation with internal RWR sensor and the ASPJ pod. It included a restricted multi-emitter test scenario for ground and aerial radar jamming. In 2023, several tests and sorties were carried out to check the integration of the SRK EW suite with Uttam radar.

As of 30 October 2025, the EW suite is undergoing flight trials which is scheduled to conclude by mid-2026. Deployment of the system is expected by 2026 end. While the RWR is integrated within the aircraft, the ASPJ pod will be mounted on a hardpoint.

==== Dhruti DR118 RWR ====
DARE develop a state-of-the-art Digital Radar Warning Receiver Dhruti DR118 RWR for fighter platforms which offers very good sensitivity, selectivity and wideband instantaneous bandwidth at the same time. The system uses frequency domain detection processing based on digital filtering that offers very low effective noise bandwidth, rendering the system highly sensitive and capable of providing very good range advantage factor against all kinds of emitters. With greater pulse density handling capability and lower hardware complexity, power and weight vis-à-vis the predecessor systems, DR118 is an ideal solution for the present and future challenges faced by military aircraft.

It is part of the Unified Electronic Warfare Suite, also referred as Swayam Raksha Kavach, for HAL Tejas. The Tejas PV-1 aircraft was used to test the technology. In 2022, CASDIC did a transfer of technology of the Digital Radar Warning Receiver to Bharat Electronics.

The RWR has four channel wide band receivers, which enhance the possibility of detecting and precisely determining the direction of enemy airborne and ground-based radars. The LSP-3 (KH2013) aircraft was used to test the Swayam Raksha Kavach EW suite for an integrated mode of operation with internal RWR sensor and the ASPJ pod. It included a restricted multi-emitter test scenario for ground and aerial radar jamming. In 2023, several tests and sorties were carried out to check the integration of the Swayam Raksha Kavach EW suite with Uttam radar.

==== D-Jag Internal RWJ System ====
D-JAG is an integrated EW system for warning and jamming that encompasses RWR, ECM, ESM functions and uses MPM based transmitters for jamming the enemy radars. The system detects and gives the information about the position of the RF sources illuminating the aircraft and applies the appropriate jamming technique.

==== Tarang radar warning receiver ====
TARANG, developed by DARE, intercepts and identifies airborne and ground based acquisition, target tracking and missile guidance radars in multi-octave frequency bands. The system provides audio and visual warnings in order to alert the pilot against imminent threats and their current state viz. Search, Track and / or missile in air. It cues the onboard self protection jammer to counter each of the detected threats with the most optimum countermeasure technique, besides acting as master of the Counter Measures Dispensing System (CMDS). TARANG RWR is on par with the best in the world and is operational in many IAF and IN aircraft platforms.

==== Pods for EW Equipment ====
DARE has in its stable subsonic and supersonic pods, employed and capable of carriage of jammer systems, high accuracy Direction Finding (DF) sub systems or special sensors forming part of a larger system.

=== Avionics Processors and Software ===
DARE has indigenously developed Airborne Computers for Su-30MKI, Jaguar, MiG 27 upgrade and the prestigious HAL Tejas. A number of computers have been developed using common module approach with a performance of over 50 million instructions per second. Radar Computer (RC) developed for the Su-30 MKI controls the phased array radar and also functions as the Radar Data Processor. Display Processor (DP) has Colour and Monochrome Symbol Generators to generate anti-aliased graphics to drive four Multi Function Displays (MFD) and Head Up Display (HUD). Currently DARE is engaged in developing Advanced computers for next generation aircraft.

==== Core Avionics Computer ====
DARE has upgraded MiG-27 aircraft into a State-of-the-art potent weapon platform by equipping it with advanced digital avionics systems. The system is built around a modular Core Avionics Computer (CAC) developed by DARE. The CAC built on open system principles houses functional modules using contemporary processors and devices. Accurate weapon delivery with free fall bombs and laser guided bombs are key features of this upgrade.

DARE evolved the system specifications and interface control requirements taking into consideration IAF need for operations and maintenance. These led to the software requirements for the CAC. DARE took up the challenge of developing the mission critical software. Over one million lines of code were developed adhering to stringent real time constraints and requisite software engineering requirements. The resultant quality software was independently verified and validated with external agencies.

=== MAWS and MSWS ===
Dual Colour Missile Approach Warning System (DCMAWS)
Dual Colour MAWS system operates in the mid IR band for identifying the approaching missiles of all generations. The spectral information of two colors is used to discriminate efficiently between sunlight reflections, background radiation and the radiation from the missile. The DCMAWS consists of a set of up to six dual color IR sensors installed on the platform, which samples the space in accordance with the defined spatial coverage and integrated with advanced processor running state-of-the-art clutter rejection and tracking algorithms to declare the oncoming missile threat with a very good false alarm rate.

Multi-Sensor Warning System (MSWS)
The MSWS is an advanced modern state-of-the-art aircraft self-protection system designed to provide vital EW capability required when operating in sophisticated, diverse and dense threat environment. The MSWS architecture provides for the integration and data fusion from a variety of sensors/receivers which provide RF/UV/Laser spectral coverage. The system shall detect and declare hostile Radars and missiles, provide related warning to pilot and initiate adequate countermeasures. The angular information of the threat is provided through audio and visual display to the pilot. The MSWS together with counter measures makes a complete Self Protection Suite (SPS) and has made entry into a number of aircraft programmes.

=== Cockpit Display ===
Next Generation Avionic Displays
DARE has developed Multi-Function Displays (MFDs) for modern fighter aircraft. Displays of size 5”x5” & 6”x6” have been developed and are in production for Su-30MKI aircraft. Large format Smart MFDs of size 6”x8” & 12”x9” for new generation aircraft have also been developed by DARE.

=== FADEC System ===
Full Authority Digital Electronic Controller for Control of an Aero Engine (FADEC)
Modern day aero-engines intended for military aircraft applications are invariably configured with a Full Authority Digital Engine Control (FADEC) system. The FADEC takes the input in terms of the thrust demand based on the current state of the engine and the flight conditions, controls the engine so as not to exceed any of the limiting parameters of the engine while at the same time providing the best response. In case of a fault condition the controlling channel switches to the second lane configuration. FADEC being a safety critical system, adequate redundancy is configured into the system to provide the necessary reliability and availability. In a single engine application, since in-flight shut down of the engine is not an option, the configuration needs to have additional specific features to ensure the availability.

=== Pilot Vehicle Interface ===
==== Engineering Flight Simulator ====
DARE has set up an Engineering Flight Simulator [EFS] facility to develop Pilot Vehicle Interface for military platforms. The EFS is based on the open source Flight Simulator environment. The PVI Graphics are developed using OpenGL graphics library for next generation Smart Multi-Function Displays (SMFD). The EFS uses DARE developed algorithms to interface and acquire essential flight data from the core flight simulator and render the MFD Graphics in real-time. The system is capable of producing visual display information for the standard instrument panels and communicating with system modules to generate aerodynamic and inertial navigation data. The simulator has advanced.

=== Other Technologies ===
1. New Generation Digital RWR/ ESM sub system
2. Digital Narrow Band Receivers with 1 GHz IBW
3. Core EW Unit with 1 GHz Processing
4. Digital RF Memory with 1 GHz BW
5. 5–18 GHz Vivaldi Antenna and Antenna Array
6. 5–18 GHz, 16 and 32 element based Active Transmit Receive Unit
