= Gaurav (glide bomb) =

Smart Glide Bomb

Gaurav long range glide bomb
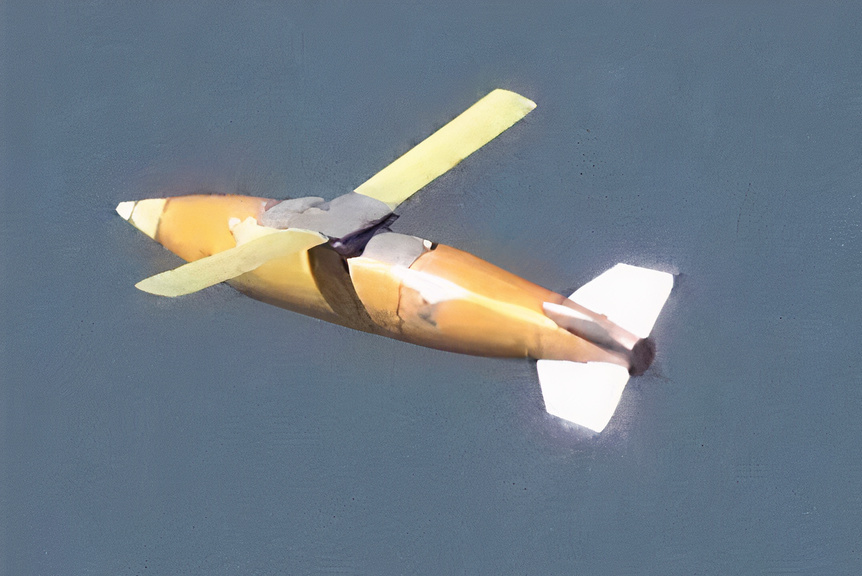
- Gaurav glide bomb during trials
- Type: Guided glide bomb
- Place of origin: India

Production history
- Designer: G. Satheesh Reddy, Research Centre Imarat (DRDO)
- Designed: 2014–present
- Manufacturer: Adani Defence & Aerospace; Bharat Forge

Specifications
- Mass: 500 kg (1,100 lb); 1,000 kg (2,200 lb)
- Length: 4.0 m
- Diameter: 0.62 m
- Wingspan: 3.4 m
- Warhead: CL-20 (fragmentation, cluster munition, PCB)
- Detonation mechanism: Contact and proximity fuze
- Operational range: 30–150 kilometres (16–81 nmi)
- Flight altitude: 10 km
- Guidance system: Mid-course: INS + multi-GNSS and digital control Terminal: SALH
- Launch platform: Sukhoi Su-30 MKI

The Long Range Glide Bomb, also known as Gaurav, is a product of the Defence Research and Development Organisation (DRDO) to deploy a standardised medium range precision guided weapon, especially for engagement of targets from outside the range of standard anti-aircraft defenses, thereby increasing aircraft survivability and minimising friendly losses. The development was carried out by Research Centre Imarat with production from Adani Defence & Aerospace and Bharat Forge.

== Origin ==
The development of glide bombs by the DRDO was first reported in June 2013. The guided bombs would carry varying payloads of 100 kg (220 lb), 250 kg (550 lb), 500 kg (1,100 lb) and 1,000 kg (2,200 lb). The agency had already conducted two trials of such bombs. The developmental trials were expected to be completed by 2014-end. The then DRDO chief also announced the development of an anti-radiation missile by the agency, which was later named Rudram.

== Development ==
The bomb was designed by the Research Centre Imarat (RCI) in Hyderabad with the help of the Defence Avionics Research Establishment (DARE) in Bengaluru, Terminal Ballistics Research Laboratory (TBRL) in Chandigarh and Armaments Research and Development Establishment (ARDE) in Pune. The team designed the bomb specially for the Indian Air Force to fulfill a requirement for precision guided weapons.

The length of the bomb is 4 meters and the diameter is 0.62 m. The wingspan of Gaurav is 3.4 meters. It has a range of up to 100 km and weighs 1,000 kg. It can carry either pre-fragmented or penetration-blast warheads. To guide the glide munition towards the target, DRDO Glide Bombs use a hybrid navigation approach that combines satellite guidance and an inertial navigation system with digital control. Gaurav is claimed to be able to destroy a wide range of targets, such as reinforced buildings, airfields, bunkers, and blast hardened structures.

== Trials ==
- 19 December 2014: A DRDO-developed 1,000 kg-class glide bomb was successfully tested in the Bay of Bengal. The bomb was dropped from an Indian Air force aircraft and covered a range of 100 km, guided through its on-board navigation system. The flight path is of the glide bomb was monitored by DRDO radars and electro-optic systems situated at Integrated Test Range (ITR), Chandipur, Odisha.
- 29 October 2021: DRDO and IAF successfully tested the Long Range Glide Bomb from a Su-30MKI at Balasore, Odisha. The bomb was released from 10 km altitude and successfully hit a sea based target using laser guidance. It is a 1,000 kg bomb which DRDO developed as an alternative to the Spice 2000. The LRGB is part of a family of newly developed precision guided munitions with a range of 50 km to 150 km in range.
- 14 August 2024: The Gaurav glide bomb was successfully tested from a Su-30MKI, striking a target at Abdul Kalam Island. Using electro-optical tracking equipment and telemetry provided by the Integrated Test Range, a team comprising DRDO, Adani Defence & Aerospace, and Bharat Forge tracked the trajectory and performance.
- 8 to 10 April 2025: Release trials of LRGB Gaurav were conducted from a Su-30MKI by DRDO at the Integrated Test Range, where it was claimed to have demonstrated a maximum range of 100 km with "pinpoint accuracy". The weapon was integrated to several stations in various warhead configurations for land targets during the trials.

== Operators ==
India

- Indian Air Force

== Gallery ==
Release trial of Gaurav from Su-30 MKI on 10 April 2025.

Gaurav completes a mid-air maneuver while gliding.

Gaurav showcased by Adani Defence & Aerospace at AMMO INDIA 2022

== See also ==
- BLU-109 bomb - United States
