= Aeronautical Development Agency =

Indian governmental aircraft design agency

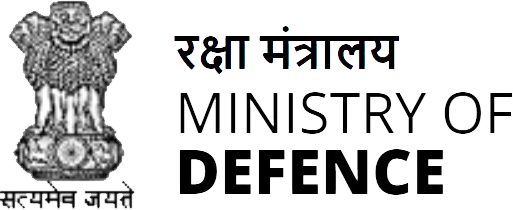
- Parent Agency - Ministry of Defence

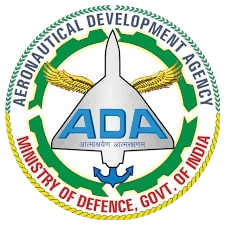

Agency overview
- Formed: 1984; 42 years ago
- Headquarters: Vimanapura, Doddanekkundi, Bengaluru, Karnataka, India
- Ministers responsible: Rajnath Singh, Defence Minister; Samir Kamat, Chairman DRDO and ex officio Secretary, Dept of Defence Research and Development
- Agency executive: Jitendra Jaisingh Jadav, Director General – ADA (since 11 September 2024)
- Website: www.ada.gov.in

The Aeronautical Development Agency (ADA), under the Department of Defence Research and Development (DR&D) of India's Ministry of Defence, was established in Bangalore in 1984 to oversee the development of the India's Light Combat Aircraft (LCA) programme. It is an affiliate agency to the Defence Research and Development Organisation (DRDO) and has developed the Tejas and is developing the Tejas Mk 2, TEDBF and AMCA.

== Facilities ==
- ASMS
- System Design and Evaluation Facility
- Computing Center
- Iron Bird
- LCA Hangar
- Lightning Test Facility
- Virtual Reality
- Wind Tunnel Testing Facility
- Core Integration & Flight Testing Centre, Puttaparthi for the AMCA programme

== Software development ==
ADA has established advanced state of the art computing centre with powerful equipments and software. ADA has developed specialised software in the fields of computer-aided design (CAD), computer-aided engineering (CAE), computer-aided manufacturing (CAM), avionics, systems, independent validation and verification, flight simulation. The spin-off benefits of the research and development is realised with help of commercial partnership with leading multi-national companies such as Boeing, Airbus, IBM, Dassault Systèmes, and Parametric Technology Corporation (PTC). The following are some of the software developed for the LCA-Tejas development programme.

- Autolay
- CADTRANS
- FINESSE
- FINEGRAF
- GITA
- PRANA
- GNRETING
