= Timeline of HAL Tejas =

Development of the HAL Tejas and its variants

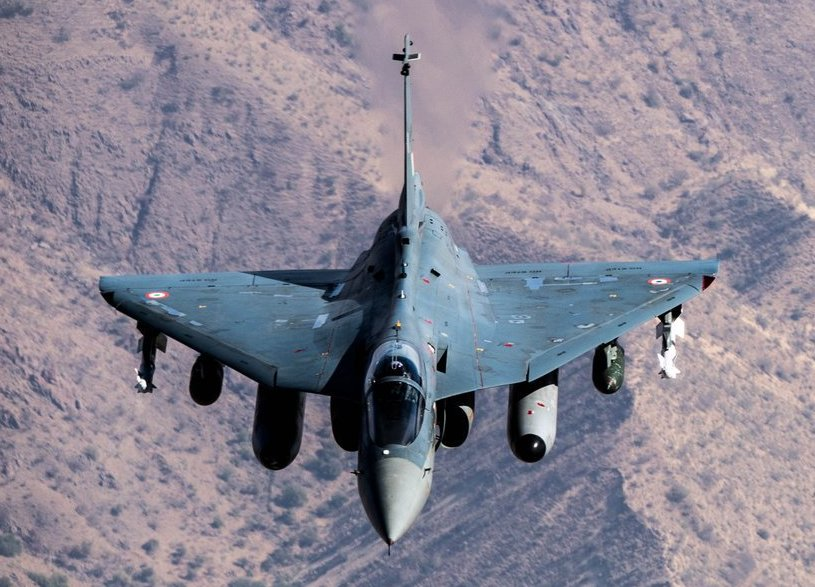
HAL Tejas

This is a timeline of the development of the HAL Tejas, a light-weight, multirole fighter aircraft manufactured by Hindustan Aeronautics Limited.

== 1980s ==
=== 1983 ===
- The DRDO obtains permission to initiate a programme to design and develop a light combat aircraft.

=== 1984 ===
- Government of India set up Aeronautical Development Agency (ADA) in 1984 as the nodal agency for managing and developing the LCA.

=== 1985 ===
- IAF submitted Air Staff Requirements (ASR) for LCA in October 1985. This was initiated by the then Air Chief Marshal Idris Hassan Latif.

=== 1986 ===
- Government allocates ₹5.75 billion (equivalent to ₹85 billion or US$890 million in 2026) for the LCA programme.
- Programme to develop an indigenous powerplant (engine)-Kaveri was launched at GTRE.

=== 1987 ===
- Project definition commenced in October 1987 with French Dassault-Breguet Aviation as consultants. Dassault-Breguet were to assist in the design and systems integration of the aircraft, with 30 top-flight engineers reported to have flown to India to act as technical advisers to IADA, in exchange for $100m.

=== 1989 ===
- Government review committee expresses confidence in LCA programme. It was decided that the programme will be carried out in two phases.

== 1990s ==
=== 1990 ===
- Design of LCA was finalised as a small delta winged relaxed static stability aircraft.
- Phase 1 of the development was commenced to create the proof of concept system. Financial problems within India prevented full scale operations from starting.

=== 1993 ===
- Full funding started from April 1993 full-scale development work for phase 1 started in June.

=== 1995 ===
- First technology demonstrator, TD-1, rolled out on 17 November 1995 and was followed by TD-2 in 1998. However, technical problems in flight control systems and structural deficiencies plagued the prototypes and they remained grounded.

=== 1997 ===
- Multi-Mode Radar (MMR) for LCA design work started at HAL's Hyderabad division and the LRDE.

== 2000s ==
=== 2001 ===
- 4 January – LCA's maiden flight successfully completed by Technology Demonstrator TD-1, on 2001. Prime minister Atal Bihari Vajpayee renames LCA as Tejas.
- Development assistance sought from Snecma on the Kaveri engine.

=== 2002 ===
- 6 June – TD-2 makes a successful maiden flight.
- MMR system was reported to be not working as per the criteria laid down in requirements.

=== 2003 ===
- Tejas crossed the sonic barrier for the first time
- 25 November – PV-1 makes a successful maiden flight.

=== 2005 ===
- 1 December – PV-2 makes a successful maiden flight.

=== 2006 ===
- 31 March - Indian Government places an initial order for twenty LCA Tejas from HAL, for delivery by December 2011. The order comprised 4 twin seat trainers, and 16 single seat LCA.
- 14 May – The PV-2 went supersonic again, but this time in a weaponised state (i.e., carrying weapons such as missiles and an internal gun).
- 1 December – The PV-3 flew for the first time for 27 minutes at an altitude of 2.5 km and at a speed of Mach 0.8. The PV-3 was equipped with a more advanced pilot interface, refined avionics and higher control law capabilities compared with the previous versions.

=== 2007 ===
- 25 April – The first Limited Series Production LCA (LSP-1) made its first flight and it reached a speed of Mach 1.1.
- PV-2 and PV-3 underwent sea-level trials at INS Rajali Naval Air Station, Arakkonam to study the effects of flying at sea-level, as all earlier trials have been conducted at Bangalore which is 3,000 feet (910 m) above sea-level. The reliability of the LCA systems under the hot and humid conditions, as well as low level flight characteristics was tested. It is due to this intense flight testing schedule that the LCA was not able to fly at the Paris air show-2007, as was originally planned.
- 7 September – Tejas Prototype Vehicle (PV-1) made a successful maiden flight with two 800-litre drop tanks.
- 25 October – Tejas PV-1 fired a Vympel R-73 missile for first time. The trials were conducted off the Goa coast at INS Hansa Naval Air Station.
- 11 December – LITENING targeting pod was successfully tested on Tejas PV-2.

=== 2008 ===
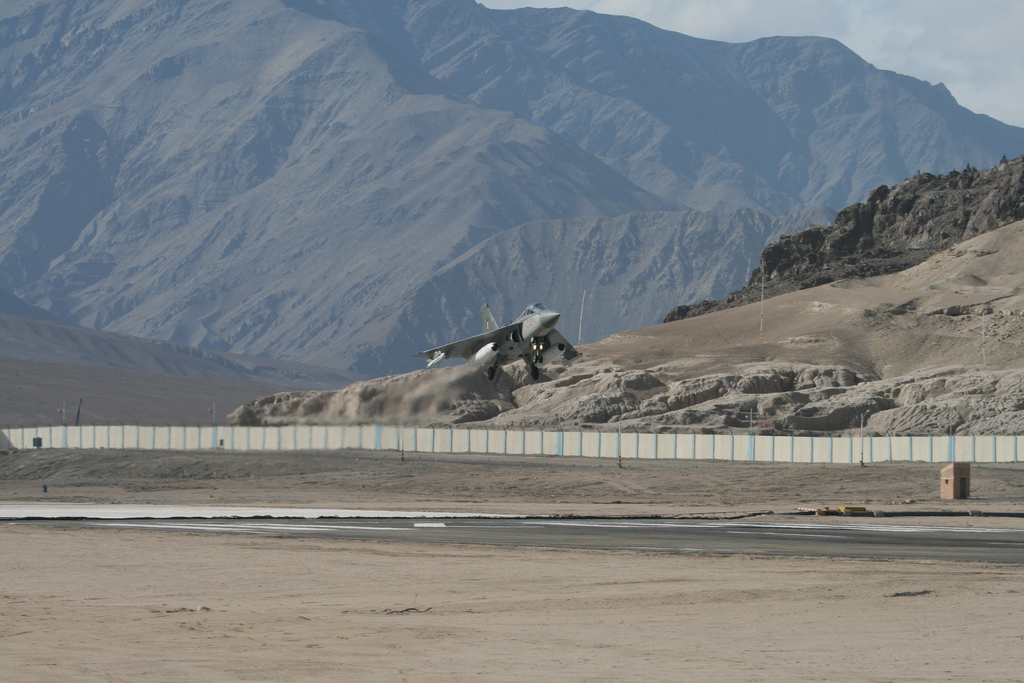
HAL Tejas high-altitude trials at Leh successfully completed by December 2008.

- 7 February – Tejas Prototype Vehicle (PV-1) made a successful flight powered by fuel from two 800-litre drop tanks. It made a 1-hour-24-minute-long sortie. On internal fuel LCA can perform a 40-minute sortie.
- April – First flight with HMDS
- May – LCA Tejas prototypes PV-2 and PV-3 underwent hot weather flight trials at Air Force Station, Nagpur from 28 May 2008 to 4 June 2008. The trials were declared successful.
- 16 June – Tejas second Limited Series Production LCA (LSP-2) made its first flight and it reached a speed of Mach 1.1.
- 7 November – LCA Prototype Vehicle-3 made its first successful night flight.
- 13 December – PV-3 and LSP-2 completed the high-altitude trials at the Leh air base.

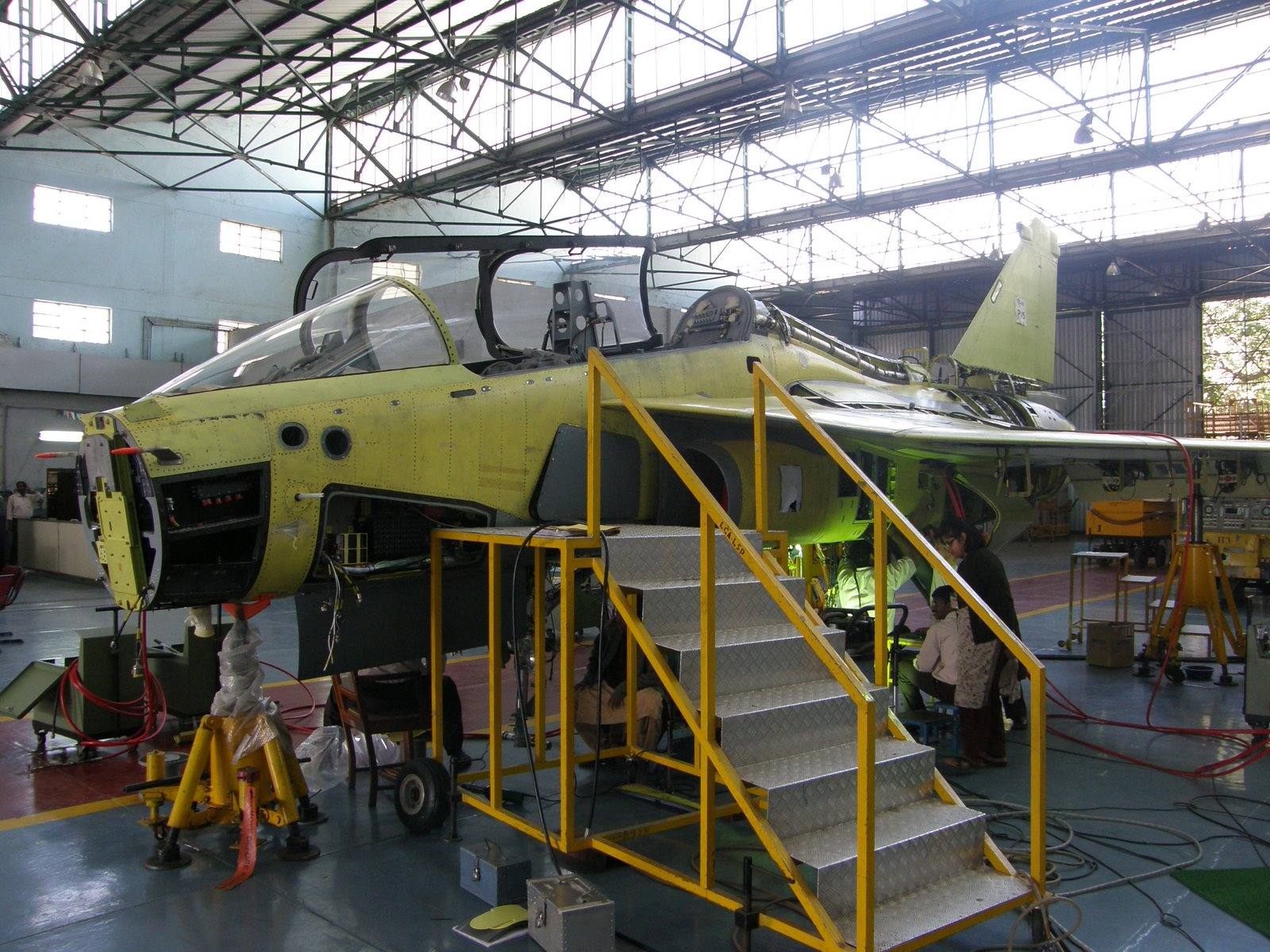
Twin-seater trainer version prototype under construction at HAL LCA Tejas division, Bengaluru for structural coupling test.

=== 2009 ===
- 22 January – Tejas completed 1000 flights.
- February – the live bombs test were successfully carried out.
- October – PV-3 and LSP-2 completed visual target elimination and air-to-ground weapons delivery trials.
- 26 November – Two seater (Trainer) version of Tejas(PV-5) made its maiden flight on 26 Nov 2009.
- 7 December – Tejas passed flight flutter test diving from an altitude of four kilometers to almost sea level at 900 feet (270 m). Tejas recorded a speed over 1350 km/h. These tests were conducted at INS Hansa, Goa.
- 15 December – Indian government sanctioned Rs 80 billion to begin production of the fighter jet for the Indian Air Force and Indian Navy.

== 2010s ==
=== 2010 ===
- 23 April – LCA Tejas LSP-3 Makes Maiden Flight. LSP-3 is almost the final configuration including the new air-data computers, Hybrid Multi Mode Radar, new communication and navigation equipment and radar warning receiver. With this the LCA programme has completed 1350 test flights logging about 800 flying hours.
- 2 June – LCA Tejas LSP-4 Makes maiden flight. The flight marks the first time for a Tejas aircraft flying in the configuration that will be finally delivered to the Indian Air Force. In addition to the Hybrid MMR, the aircraft also flew with a functioning Countermeasure Dispensing System
- 19 November – LCA Tejas LSP-5 Makes Maiden Flight. Goes supersonic in first flight.
- 23 December - Indian Government orders twenty additional LCA Tejas, from HAL, for delivery by December 2016. The order stipulated four additional trainers, and 16 single seat LCA.

=== 2011 ===
- 10 January – Certification for the Release to Services with assured safety and specified performance for IOC.
- 26 January – LCA Tejas participates in the 26 January Republic Day Celebrations by being paraded at New Delhi.
- September – LCA Tejas undergoes bombing runs at Pokhran Test Range.

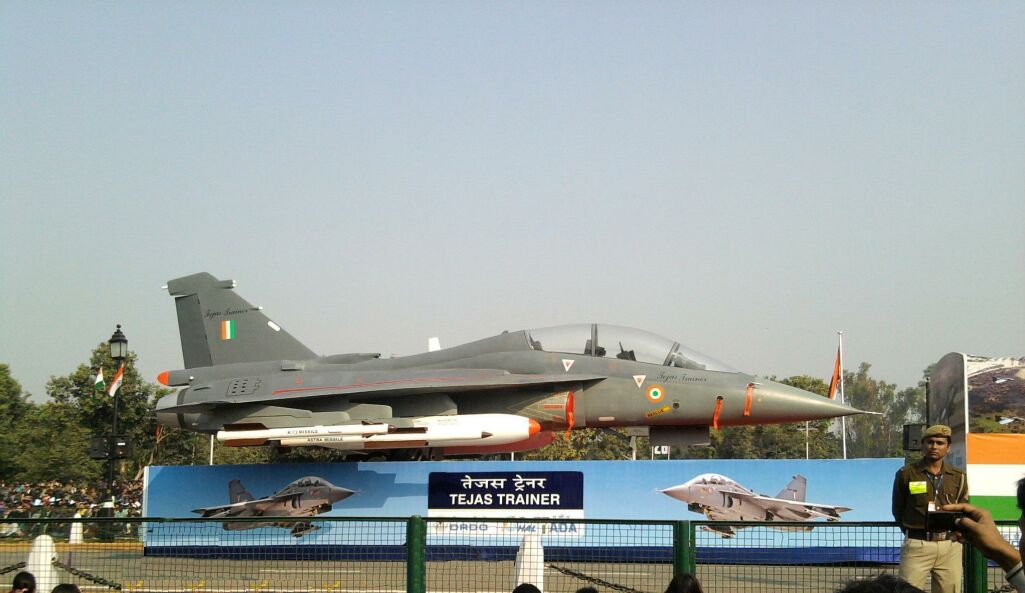
Tejas Trainer at 62nd Republic Day of India Parade, New Delhi

=== 2012 ===
- 9 March – LCA Tejas LSP-7 Makes Maiden Flight
- 27 April – 1st Naval LCA prototype NP-1 makes maiden flight.
- 27 June – HAL Tejas (LSP 2, 3 and 5) completed precision bombing runs in the desert of Rajasthan, for the second time.

=== 2013 ===
- 31 March 2013 – LSP 8 had a successful maiden test flight at Bangalore.
- 28 September – The Light Combat Aircraft (LCA) Tejas successfully completed the maiden engine relight test on Friday—a critical parameter the programme needs to achieve for the Initial Operational Clearance 2 (IOC-2). The Limited Series Production (LSP-7) aircraft from the Tejas flight-line, piloted by Gp Capt R R Tyagi, underwent the engine relight test at 1 pm. The LSP-7 was chased by a Hawk aircraft.
- 20 December – Indian Defence Minister A. K. Antony handed over the "Release to Service Document" of the country's own Light Combat Aircraft to the Chief of Air Staff Air Chief Marshal NAK Browne.

=== 2014 ===
- 28 May 2014 – LSPs 3, 5 and 7 successfully complete advanced weapons trials.

=== 2015 ===
- 17 January – IAF gets first indigenously built light combat aircraft Tejas – The LCA Tejas Series Production-1 (SP1) was handed over by Defence Minister Manohar Parrikar to Indian Air Force Chief Air Marshal Arup Raha in Bengaluru on Saturday.
- 7 February – First flight of the Naval prototype (NP-2) with ski-jump take-off and arrested landing required in STOBAR carrier.
- 30 September – Decision was taken to start mass-production of the Tejas Mk-1A
- 1 December – Indian Government announced it will order 100 Tejas Mk-1As for the IAF
- Late December – Tejas pulls 8g during test flights, clearing a critical flight test parameter towards attaining final operational clearance.

=== 2016 ===
- 16 January – Tejas makes first overseas flight to participate in the 2016 Bahrain International Airshow.
- 21 January – Tejas makes international debut at the 2016 Bahrain International Airshow.
- 16 March – MoS for Defence Rao Inderjit Singh said a proposal for ramping up of production of LCA from the present installed capacity of 8–16 aircraft per annum is being processed, and around Rs. 12.59 billion will be spent for the purpose. A case for an additional 80 LCA Mk-1A fighters is also being progressed for placing orders.
- 1 July – Tejas SP1 and SP2 (Mk. 1) formally inducted into IAF. First squadron of two aircraft raised at Bengaluru; remaining 18 aircraft to be supplied by 2018.
- 2 December – The Indian Navy rejected Tejas MK1 Navy for being too overweight for carrier operations.

=== 2017 ===
- 12 May – A Tejas successfully fires a Derby Air-to-Air BVR missile, in radar guided mode at Interim Test Range (ITR), Chandipur.

=== 2018 ===
- 23 July – LCA Navy NP2 flies for the first time with a tail-hook (arresting hook).
- 2 August – LCA Navy NP2 started taxi in engagement arrester trials.
- 10 September – Tejas refuels in mid-air for the first time, with 1,900 kg (4,200 lb) fuel transfer from an Ilyushin Il-78MKI.

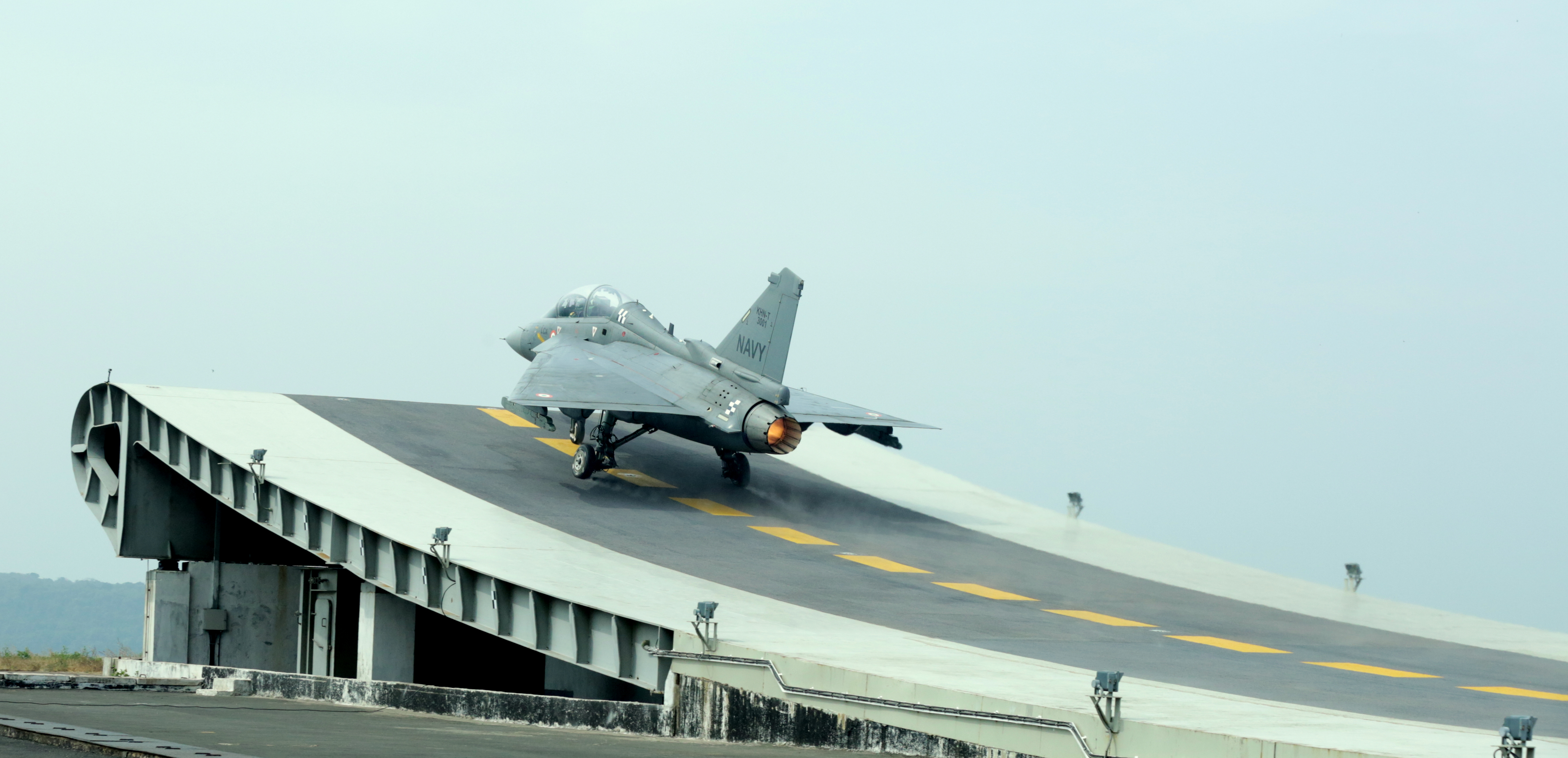
Ski-jump takeoff of Tejas NP-1 from Shore Based Test Facility, INS Hansa.

=== 2019 ===
- 20 February – Tejas was awarded Final Operational Clearance.
- 13 September - Tejas Navy successfully completed arrested landing.
- 12 November - LCA Navy makes successful night time arrested landing.

== 2020s ==
=== 2020 ===
- 11 January - Maiden deck landing of LCA Navy NP2 onboard INS Vikramaditya
- 12 January - LCA Navy's maiden take off from INS Vikramaditya
- 17 March - Maiden flight of LCA Tejas SP-21 FOC variant.
- 27 May - Formation of second squadron of Tejas, No. 18 Squadron IAF Flying Bullets.

=== 2021 ===
- 27 April - Tejas has added capability of firing Israeli-origin Python-5 air-to-air missile (AAM).

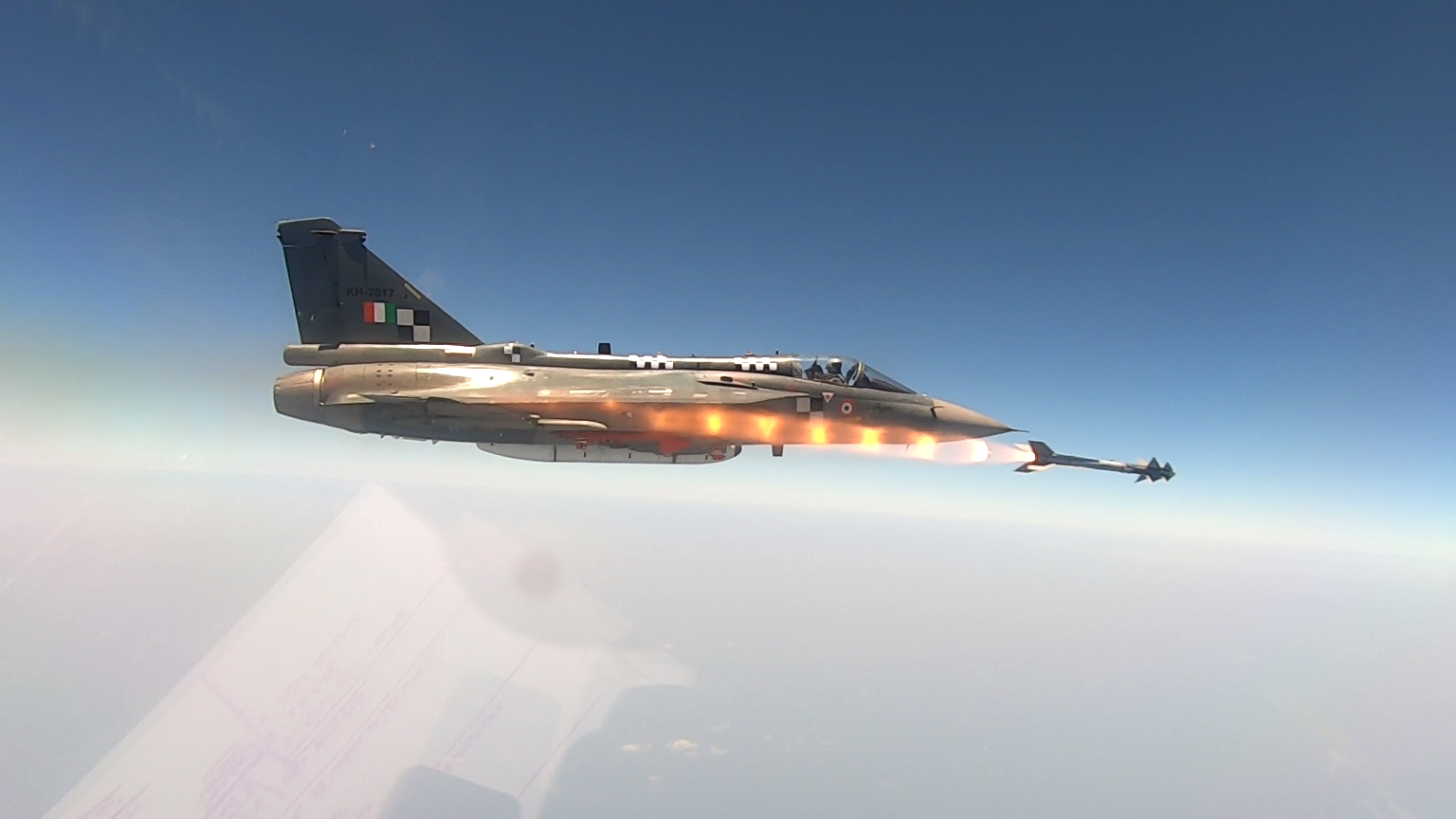
HAL Tejas (LSP-07) firing Python-5 missile

=== 2022 ===
- 20 May - First flight of Tejas Mk1-A prototype.

=== 2023 ===
- 5 April - maiden flight of first production standard LCA Tejas Trainer (LT 5201).
- 23 August – Maiden firing of indigenous BVR missile Astra.

=== 2024 ===
- 12 March - First crash of a Mk1 Tejas, during a training flight over Jaisalmer, Rajasthan.
- 28 March - First flight of production model Tejas Mk1-A aircraft. The flight occurred at HAL airport, Bengaluru. The aircraft (LA 5033) was airborne for 18 minutes during the flight.

=== 2025 ===
- 21 November - Mk1 Tejas crashes at Dubai airshow.

=== 2026 ===
- 18 September - The final two Tejas Mk1 trainers have been delivered to the IAF, completing the delivery of all 40 Tejas Mk1 aircraft.
