= NASM-MR =

Indian anti-ship missile system

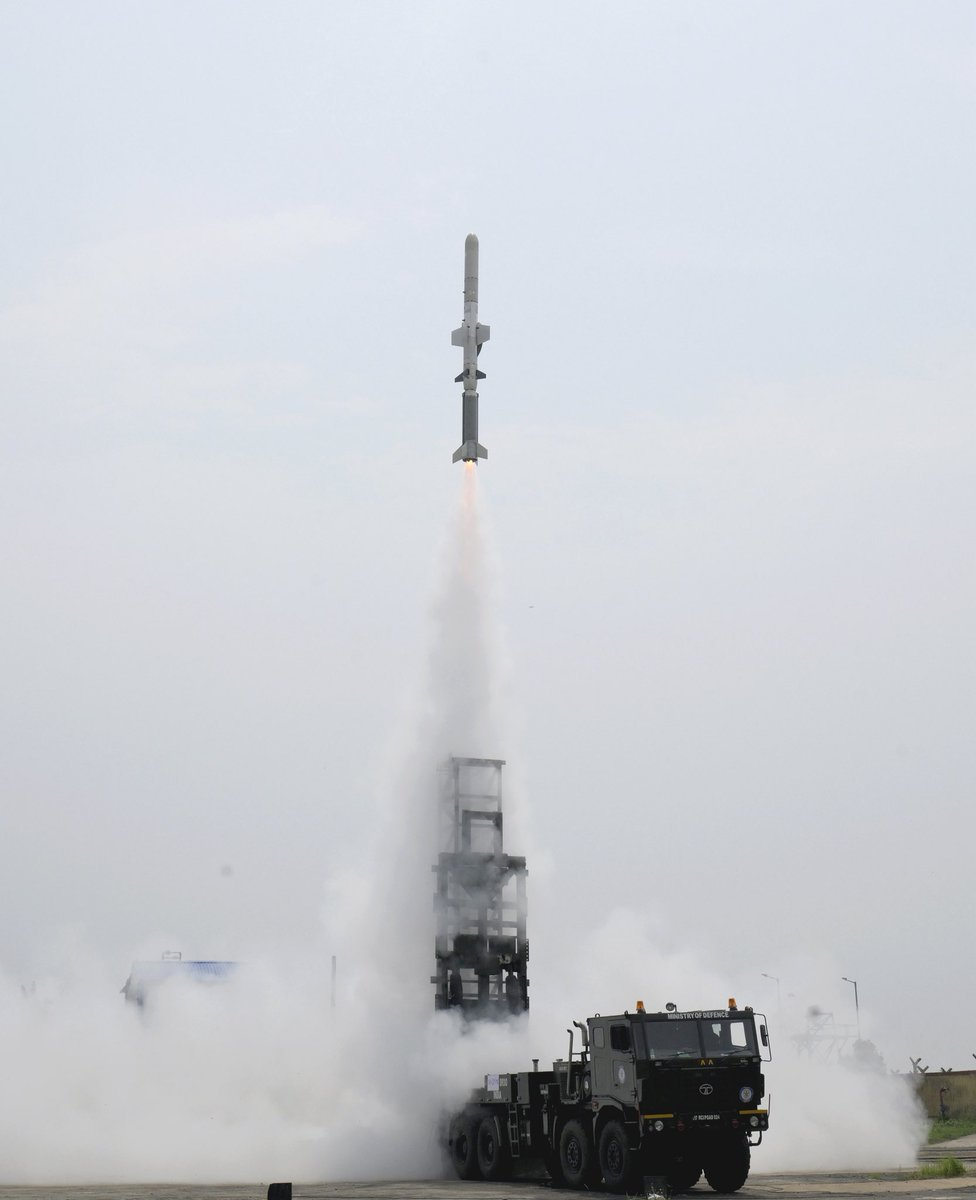
- NASM-MR launched from Tata LPTA 3138 8×8 HMV
- Type: Naval anti-ship missile
- Place of origin: India

Service history
- Used by: Indian Navy (intended)

Production history
- Designer: Defence Research and Development Organisation

Specifications
- Mass: 600 kg (1,300 lb)
- Length: 5.2 m (17 ft)
- Diameter: 480 mm (1.57 ft)
- Wingspan: 120 cm (47 in)
- Warhead: PCB
- Warhead weight: 150 kg (330 lb)
- Engine: Solid booster + turbojet
- Operational range: 350 kilometres (220 mi)
- Maximum speed: Around Mach 0.9
- Guidance system: Mid-course: INS + GNSS + radar altimeter + two-way datalink Terminal: ARH
- Launch platform: HAL Tejas, Mikoyan MiG-29K, HAL TEDBF, Warships, Submarine, Tata LPTA 3138 HMV

Naval Anti-Ship Missile–Medium Range (NASM–MR) or Medium Range Anti-Ship Missiles (MRAShM) is an all-weather, over-the-horizon anti-ship missile being developed by the Defence Research and Development Organisation for the Indian Navy for use against small to medium sized warships like frigates, corvettes, and destroyers. The NASM-MR will belong to the same class as the U.S.-origin Harpoon missile.

== Development ==
On 6 November 2023, the DRDO completed the preliminary design review of the NASM-MR missile and was proceeding for developing wind tunnel model for testing the to finalize the aerodynamic configuration.

On 30 November 2023, Defence Acquisition Council (DAC), chaired by the Defence Minister, Rajnath Singh, under the Ministry of Defence, cleared the acquisition of the Medium Range Anti-Ship Missiles (MRAShM) for surface warships of the Indian Navy which is envisaged as a lightweight Surface-to-Surface Missile to be used as a primary offensive weapon onboard Indian Naval Ships. An acquisition of 450 examples are expected.

The integration of NASM-MR with MiG-29K was completed in 2023. The fighter jet's and the missile's electrical and mechanical interfaces have been checked. In order to verify missile's target and guidance package under actual flight conditions, live-fire tests will be conducted after carry and separation trials. According to mission requirements, the missile can follow specified waypoints and have the ability to sea skim. With the integration of the missile with MiG-29K completed, the maiden flight tests of the weapon is scheduled in the first quarter of 2026.

=== Warhead ===
During the June 2026 trials, the missile was equipped with a penetration-cum-blast warhead, an engine source from Safran, and a solid propellant booster which is unique for the ground-launched variant. However, for long-term production variants, the missile will utilise an indigenous Advanced Turbo Gas Generator (ATGG) single-spool compact turbojet developed by Gas Turbine Research Establishment and Azad Engineering Limited. The ground-launched variant can also be offered as a product. The first ATGG indigenous expendable turbojet engine with a thrust class of 350 kgf (3.4 kN) was delivered on 22 July 2026.

== Trials ==
The first flight trial of the NASM-MR was conducted between 10 and 11 June 2026 from the Integrated Test Range (ITR). The missile was launched from a ground-based launcher.

== Variants ==
There will be multiple variants of the missile will be developed. The variants include:

- Air-launched variant: Will be deployed onboard fixed-wing fighter aircraft like the MiG-29K and maritime patrol aircraft (MPA) like Boeing P-8I Neptune. An HAL Tejas Mk1A can carry five NASM-MR missiles. Range: 290 kilometres (180 mi).
- Ship-launched variant: Being developed under the Medium Range Anti-Ship Missiles (MRAShM) programme for deployment from vertical launchers aboard frontline warships. It will include an additional solid-fuel rocket booster. Range: 350 kilometres (220 mi).
- Submarine-launched variant: Will include an additional solid-fuel rocket booster. Range: >100 kilometres (62 mi).
- Coastal defence batteries: May take longer than the other three variants due to Indian Navy requirements.

== See also ==
- NASM-SR – Indian anti-ship missile system
- Harpoon – (United States)
- Exocet – (France)
- Kalibr – (Russia)
- Kh-35 – (Russia)
- Naval Strike Missile – (Norway)
- Type 12 surface-to-ship missile – (Japan)
- Type 88 surface-to-ship missile – (Japan) – (Japan)
