= Mishra Dhatu Nigam =

Metallurgy industry

Mishra Dhatu Nigam Limited

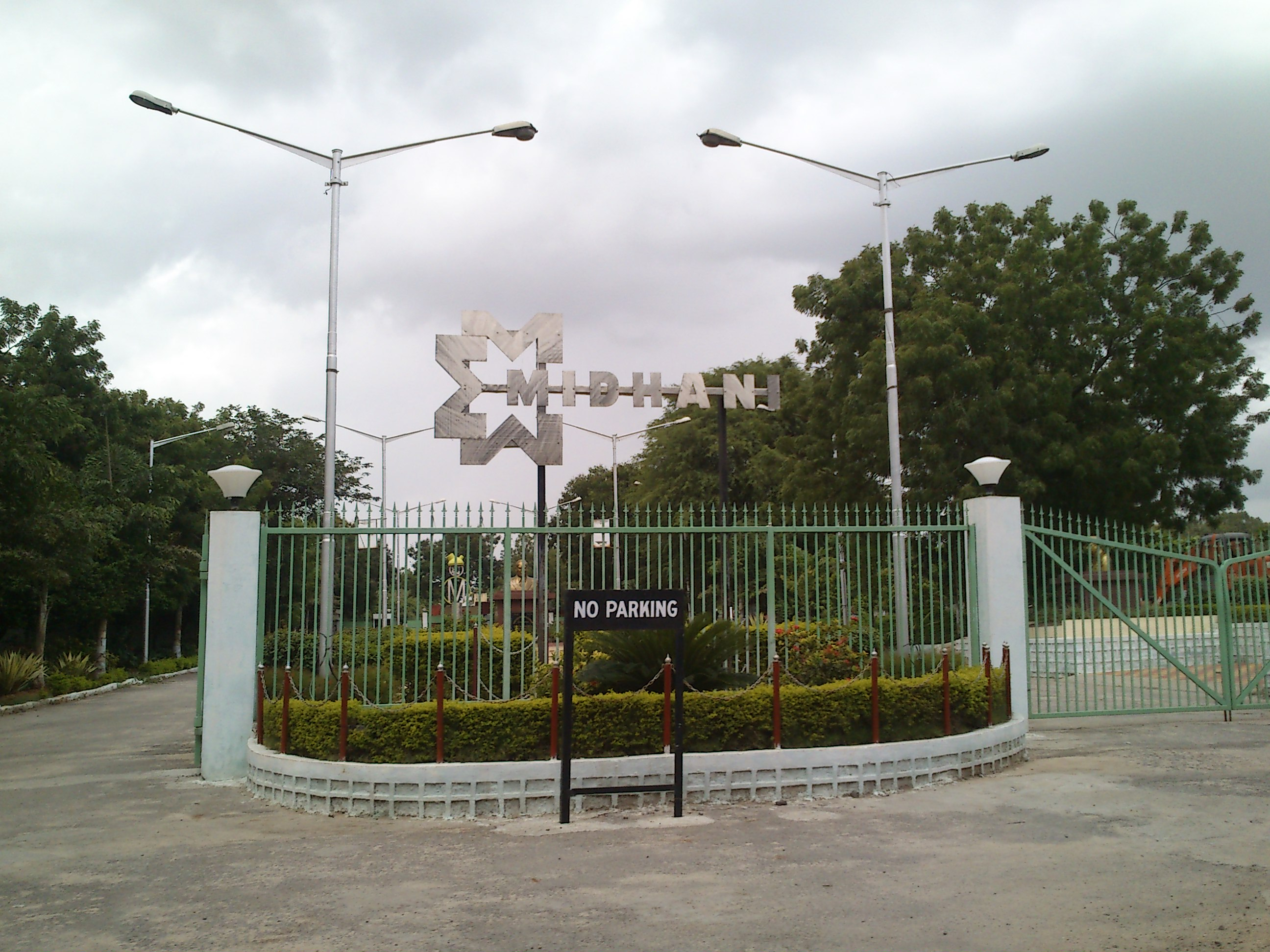
- Type: Public Sector Undertaking
- Traded as: BSE: 541195; NSE: MIDHANI
- Industry: Metallurgy
- Founded: 1973; 53 years ago
- Headquarters: Hyderabad, India
- Area served: Worldwide
- Key people: Dr. SVS Narayana Murty (Chairman & MD)
- Products: Superalloys Titanium alloys; Specialized Steels High Reliability Electrical & Electronic Alloys Soft Magnetic alloys Magnesium Alloys Titanium Tubes Columbium Alloy Biomedical Implants Armour Products
- Services: Testing & Evaluation Metallurgical Consultancy Services
- Revenue: ▲₹749.31 crore (US$78 million) (2020)
- Operating income: ▲₹208.01 crore (US$22 million) (2020)
- Net income: ▲₹159.73 crore (US$17 million) (2020)
- Total assets: ▲₹1,824.67 crore (US$190 million) (2019)
- Total equity: ▲₹187.34 crore (US$19 million) (2020)
- Owner: Government Of India (74.00%)
- Number of employees: 791 (March 2019)
- Website: Official website

Mishra Dhatu Nigam Limited (abbreviated as MIDHANI) is a metals and metal alloys manufacturing facility in Hyderabad, Telangana, India. It operates as a Public Sector Undertaking (PSU) under the administrative control of the Department of Defence Production Ministry of Defence, Government of India.

== Joint ventures ==
- Utkarsha Aluminium Dhatu Nigam Limited is a joint venture of NALCO and MIDHANI.

== Competitors ==
- Carpenter Technology
- Starwire
- Sunflag
- Saarloha
- PTC Industries
- Jindal Defence

== Products ==
MIDHANI specializes in manufacturing a wide range of superalloys, titanium, special-purpose steels, and other special metals & alloys meeting international standards. These materials are used in applications across aerospace, defence, atomic energy, power generation, chemical, and various other high-technology industries. MIDHANI provided unique metals and alloys for the Gaganyaan programme, Aditya-L1 mission, and Chandrayaan-3 mission in 2023. Additionally, the company has created products for Manik engine, Kaveri Derivative Engine, and Advanced Medium Combat Aircraft.

=== Superalloys ===
TITAN 26A and TITAN 29A are high-temperature titanium alloys that have been indigenously developed in India, in which MIDHANI collaborated with DMRL. The development of these alloys represents a significant step toward self-reliance in the aerospace sector, They are used for manufacturing critical components like compressor discs, blades, and shafts for engines, including those for Adour (Jaguar aircraft) and Kaveri aircraft engines. These alloys are part of the titanium-aluminum-vanadium family.

=== Armour products ===
MIDHANI has been manufacturing bulk quantities of armour steel products offering ballistic protection against a variety of weapon systems including 9mm SMC, AK-47 and 7.62mm SLR etc. based on technologies developed by DMRL, a constituent of the DRDO.

Select few armoured products manufactured by MIDHANI are, "Rakshak" bullet-proof jackets, "Patka" (headband) for protection of head, bulletproof protection of personnel carriers for paramilitary forces & VVIP cars and custom-made/fabricated armour systems.

MIDHANI also manufactures and markets Bhabha Kavach, which is an armour panel that protects against bullets of different threat levels. A special process developed by BARC is used to create panels offering Level III and Level III+ ballistic protection while being much lighter than other currently available ballistic armour in the international market. BARC has transferred the technology of Bhabha Kavach to MIDHANI and the Ordnance Factory Board, for serial production.

=== Welding electrodes ===
MIDHANI is the only company in India capable of manufacturing non-synthetic type welding electrodes for various defence applications namely, for the construction of nuclear submarines, surface ships, among others.

=== Biomedical implants ===
MIDHANI manufactures custom implants/biomedical products to suit the specific requirements of patients and doctors, for e.g., hinge knee Joint, ace tabular cup with attached lliac wing and lumbar puncture needle device etc.

MIDHANI conforms to ASTM, BS, ISO & IS & other standards for materials as well as biomedical products. MIDHANI has facilities for inspection and quality control for surgical implants like – full range of Mechanical Testing, comprehensive Physical and Magnetic testing, total range of NDT including gamma ray, ultrasonic, magnetic, dye penetrate test etc.

=== Nickel–titanium shape memory alloys (NiTi-SMAs) ===
Under the Make in India initiative, MIDHANI has signed a transfer of technology (ToT) agreement with the National Aerospace Laboratories (CSIR-NAL), a Bangalore-based R&D Laboratory, for the processing of nickel–titanium shape memory alloys (NiTi-SMAs) for engineering and bio-medical applications. The shape memory technology is a result of a decade of R&D work carried out at CSIR-NAL. MIDHANI is involved in the development and manufacturing of titanium implants using the spin off technologies for defence applications, and is now tapping into the potential of nickel – titanium (NiTi) shape memory alloys in Bio-Medical Sector (medical devices), especially the stent market for which the company will manufacture shape memory alloys and market the products for the first time in India.

The total market for NiTi SMA Products in India is estimated to be Rs. 1500 – Rs. 2500 crore, which is 3 – 5% of the global consumption. MIDHANI plans to manufacture NiTi shape memory alloys in wires, strips, rods, springs, and plates form. Presently, NiTi shape memory alloys are not available commercially in the country, and the total requirements are met by imports.

Through the transfer of shape memory alloy processing technology and technical support from CSIR–NAL, including vacuum melting and alloy processing capabilities, MIDHANI began development toward the commercial production of shape memory alloys.

== Services ==
=== Consultancy ===
==== Customized products/services ====
MIDHANI performs forging, rolling, heat treatment, investment, and sand casting, as well as other conversion processes. The company also manufactures finished machined and fabricated products, utilizing both in-house and external facilities to manage production responsibilities for end products.

==== Metallurgical consultancy services ====
MIDHANI has acquired an in-depth understanding of the Processing–Structure–Evolution–Material Performance / Behavior interrelationships, which have contributed to solving several daunting technological problems in the field of metallurgy. The company offers failure analysis, material selection, and alloy design services on a consultancy basis to customers.

=== Testing and evaluation ===
A comprehensive range of testing and evaluation services covering chemical analysis, mechanical, non-destructive and magnetic testing are rendered by Midhani.

== Facilities ==
MIDHANI's primary manufacturing facilities are located in the city of Hyderabad, Telangana.

The manufacturing facility also includes facilities such as vacuum arc re-melting furnaces, vacuum induction melting furnaces, creep testing machines, heat treatment and oil quenching facilities, electro-slag refining furnaces, vacuum induction refining furnaces, primary melting furnaces and secondary melting furnaces

It has specialised facilities which include – Precision 12-HI-Cold-Strip mill, 1500 Ton forge press, hot rolling & precision cold rolling mills, bar and wire drawing machines, tube plant, Vacuum Investment Casting Facility, core & lamination facility, quality assurance & control lab as well as facilities for various other related applications.

MIDHANI is also the only company to possess a 6000-ton forging press in India.

MIDHANI has also set up a 4 MW solar power plant, spread over 20 acres of land, and generates 7,000 MWh/year of electricity with a projected saving of Rs 5 crore per year and reduction of 5,600 tonnes of carbon dioxide (CO_{2}) per year. It will cover up to 15 percent of the power requirements of the company from renewable sources.

== Current projects ==
=== Wide plate mill ===
MIDHANI, Hyderabad, awarded a contract to Danieli for the design, manufacture, supply, and installation of a complete, modern plate mill complex consisting of a wide plate rolling mill and a modern plate treatment and finishing.

The new wide plate mill will be able to process metal plates up to 3100 mm wide and from 4 mm to 20 mm in thickness in a large range of special alloys, including titanium, super-alloys, stainless steel, HSLA steels, etc.

Production for the first plates is scheduled to begin by the second half of 2019.

=== Aluminium alloy plant ===
MIDHANI is planning to set up an aluminium alloy plant at Bodduvaripalem, 21 km from Nellore City, in Kodavalur mandal of SPSR Nellore district.

The organisation is planning to invest between Rs. 2,500 crore to Rs. 3,000 crore on the facility.

The Midhani plant will be a joint venture with the state-owned aluminium producing company, National Aluminium Company (NALCO). A foreign country will join in as a technology partner and consultant.

=== Armouring unit ===
MIDHANI will set up another unit at the Industrial Model Township (IMT), Rohtak, Haryana, where the company has decided to set up its unit to manufacture 13 types of armoured vehicles. Land has been acquired for the Rohtak plant, which will manufacture bullet-proof jackets, bullet-proof vehicles, and similar products for the armed forces.
