= Nirbhay =

Indian subsonic cruise missile in limited service and further development

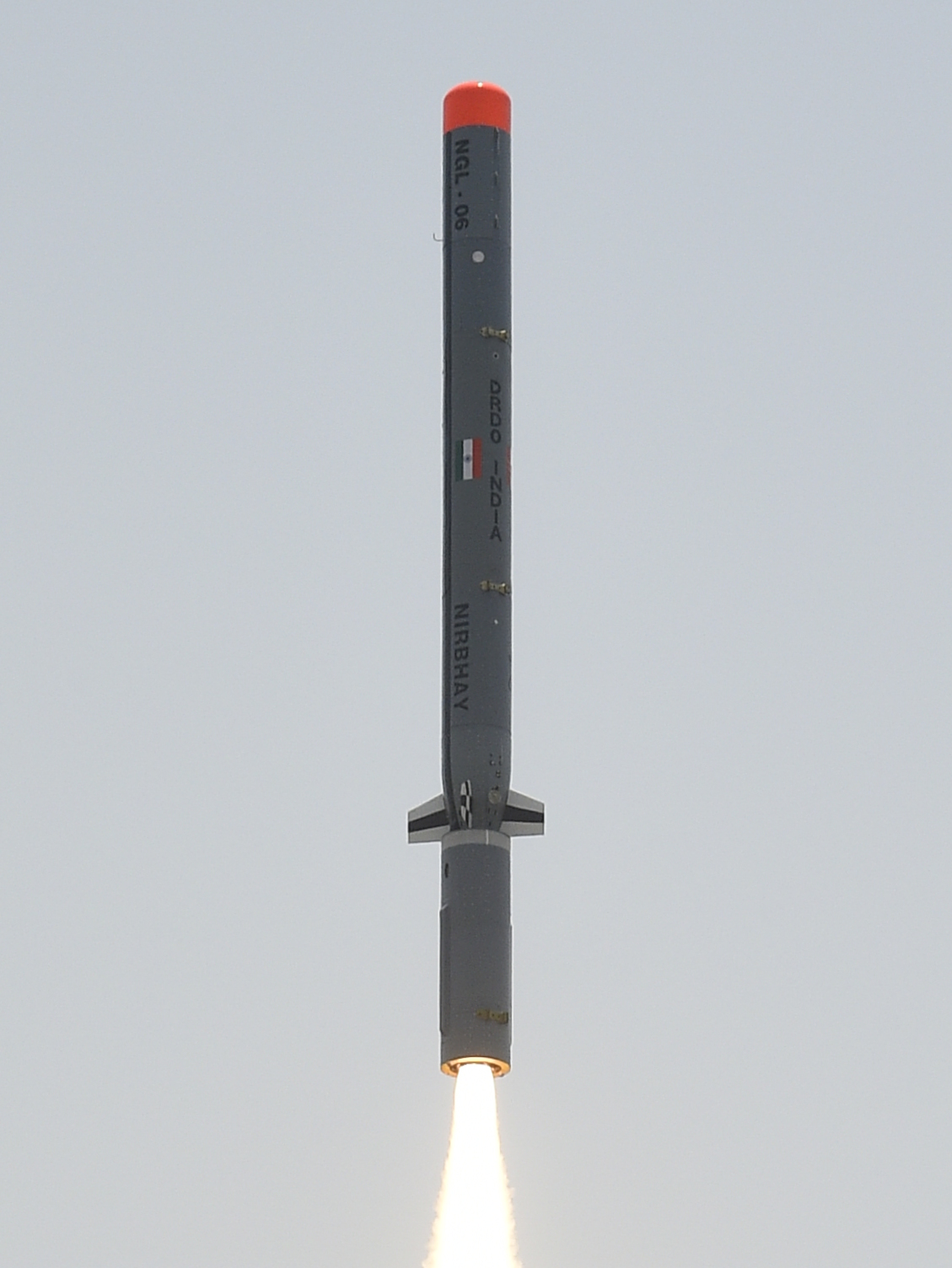
- Nirbhay cruise missile launched on 15 April 2019
- Type: Long-range, all-weather, subsonic cruise missile Surface-to-surface missile
- Place of origin: India

Service history
- In service: Limited deployment
- Used by: Strategic Forces Command; Indian Army; Indian Air Force; Indian Navy

Production history
- Designer: Aeronautical Development Establishment
- Manufacturer: Bharat Dynamics Limited
- Variants: ITCM; SLCM; LR-LACM

Specifications
- Mass: 1,500 kilograms (3,300 lb)
- Length: 6 m (20 ft)
- Diameter: 0.52 m (1.7 ft)
- Wingspan: 2.7 m (8.9 ft)
- Warhead: Conventional (PCB, blast fragmentation) or Nuclear
- Warhead weight: 450 kg
- Engine: First stage: Solid rocket booster Second stage: Turbojet (for few initial tests); Turbofan - GTRE Manik
- Propellant: First stage: Solid fuel Second stage: Liquid fuel
- Operational range: up to 1,500 km (930 mi)
- Flight altitude: 50 m (160 ft) to 4 km (13,000 ft)
- Maximum speed: 0.9 Mach
- Guidance system: Mid-course: RLG-INS with MEMS gyro + multi-GNSS; Terminal: ARH / EO / IIR
- Launch platform: TEL, VLS (Warships)
- Transport: Tata LPTA 5252 12×12 High Mobility Vehicle

Nirbhay (lit. 'Fearless') is a long range, all-weather, subsonic, surface-to-surface cruise missile designed and developed in India by the Aeronautical Development Establishment (ADE) which is under Defence Research and Development Organisation (DRDO). The missile can be launched from multiple platforms and is capable of carrying conventional and nuclear warheads.

It is currently deployed in limited numbers on the Line of Actual Control (LAC) as part of India's standoff with China.

== Design ==
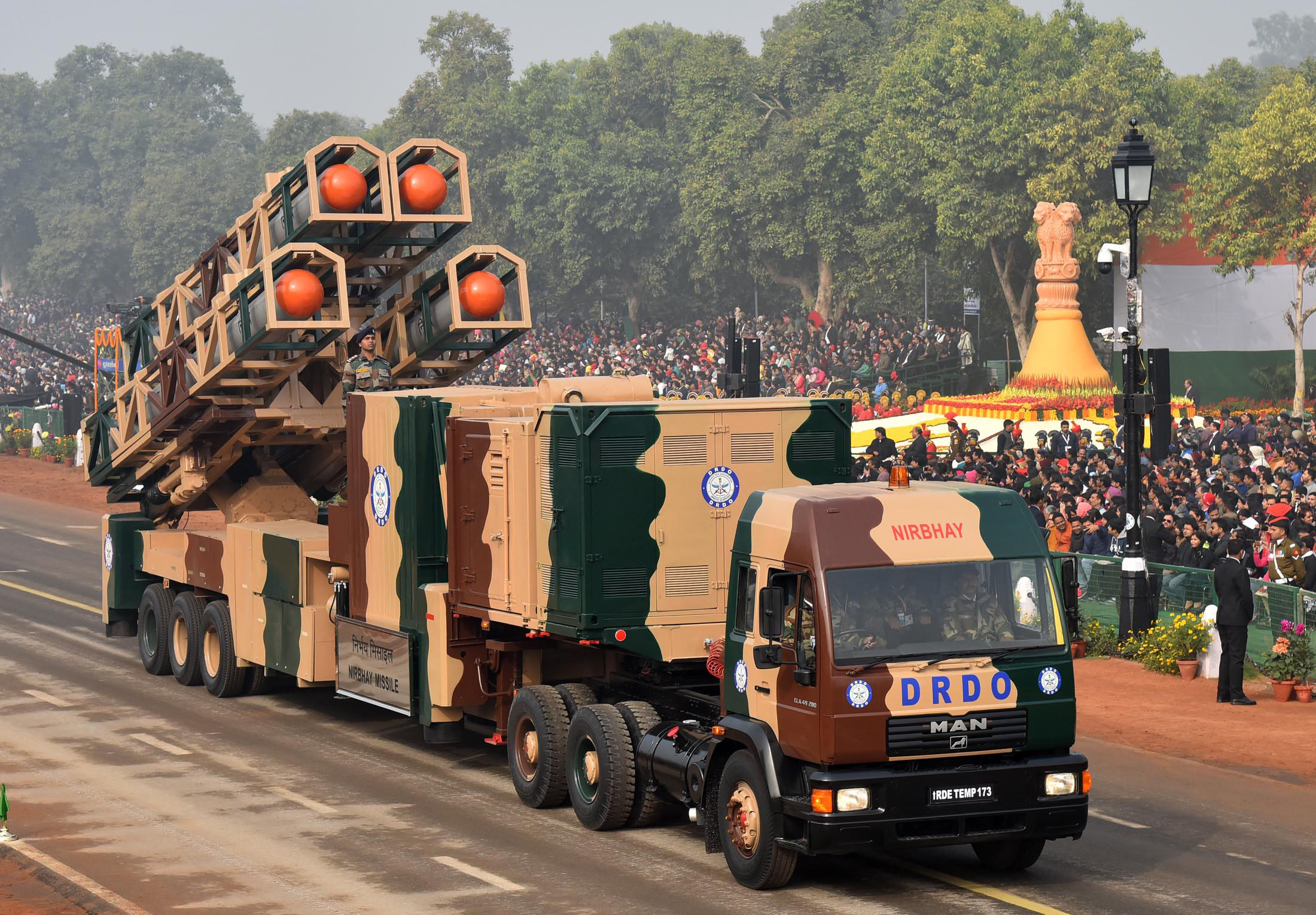
Nirbhay missiles mounted on a truck-based launcher, 2018

Nirbhay missiles are powered by a solid rocket booster for take off, which is developed by the Advanced Systems Laboratory (ASL). Upon reaching the required velocity and height, a turbofan engine in the missile takes over for further propulsion. The missile is guided by an inertial navigation system developed by the Research Centre Imarat (RCI) and a radio altimeter for the height determination. The missile has a ring laser gyroscope (RLG) based guidance, control and navigation system. It also has a microelectromechanical system (MEMS) based inertial navigation system (INS) along with the GPS/NavIC system. The missile has a length of 6 metres, width of 0.52 metres, a wing span of 2.7 metres and weighs about 1500 kg. It has a range of about 1500 km and is capable of delivering 24 different types of warheads depending on mission requirements between 200 and 300 kg. The missile is claimed to have sea-skimming and loitering capability, i.e., it can circle around a target and perform several manoeuvres and then re-engage it. It is also able to pick out a target and attack it among multiple targets. With two side wings, the missile is capable of flying at different altitudes ranging from 50 m to 4 km above the ground and can also fly at low altitudes (like low tree level) to avoid detection by enemy radar. It will eventually supplement the role played by the BrahMos missile for the Indian Armed Forces by delivering warheads farther than the 450 km range.

After the design was finalized, the technology required for the missile was developed. It was integrated by Research and Development Establishment (Engineers), a specialized arm of DRDO. Tata Motors has built the vehicle that is the carrier/launcher for the Nirbhay system and is based on a "high mobility, all-terrain and all-wheel drive Tata LPTA 5252-12×12 vehicle", developed in partnership with DRDO. The aerodynamic characterization research was conducted at the National Aerospace Laboratories' 1.2m Trisonic Wind Tunnel Facility.

=== Further development ===
DRDO announced the completion of the Nirbhay cruise missile development project on 6 February 2023 after completing six developmental trials. The next phase of tests will happen from April 2020 under the Indigenous Technology Cruise Missile (ITCM) programme. It will include Small Turbo Fan Engine (STFE) developed by Gas Turbine Research Establishment (GTRE) and a radio-frequency (RF) seeker from Research Centre Imarat (RCI). A separate air-launched variant and submarine-launched variant is under active development.

DRDO intends to increase the range to 2,500 kilometers.

== Variants ==
=== Base variant ===
The standard Nirbhay subsonic cruise missile is powered by a Russian NPO Saturn 36MT engine.

=== ITCM ===
The Indigenous Technology Cruise Missile, abbreviated as ITCM, is based on Nirbhay missile but uses locally developed Small Turbo Fan Engine (STFE), also known as Manik Engine from Gas Turbine Research Establishment. The ITCM is a technology demonstrator programme to validate the capability of STFE, upgraded radio frequency (RF) seekers, and other subsystems. The main objective of this programme to achieve 100% indigenous contents in the cruise missile.

=== LR–LACM ===
The Long Range–Land Attack Cruise Missile, abbreviated as the LR–LACM, is a longer range variant of the Nirbhay with a range up to 1,500 km. As its primary user, the Indian Navy is collaborating with the Indian Air Force in design, development, and acquisition of LR-LACM systems and associated equipment. Upon completion of development, both branches of the military would operate this missile. It would be compatible with the Universal Vertical Launch Module (UVLM) cells used for BrahMos used by the Navy on frontline waships. It will weigh about one tonne, have a length of 6 m and diameter of 0.52 m. The missile is designed to have two tapering-chord fold-out wings with a span of 2.7 m. The missile would be equipped with Manik engine, upgraded radio frequency (RF) seekers, and other subsystems.

The Defence Acquisition Council (DAC) approved the procurement of the missile for the Indian Army and the Indian Air Force in February 2024 and November 2023 at the cost of ₹4,000 crore (US$420 million) and ₹10,000 crore (US$1.0 billion), respectively.

The Acceptance of Necessity for the missile project has been approved by the Defence Acquisition Council (DAC), headed by the Defence Minister. The project has gained Mission Mode status. The development-cum-production partners of the missile are Bharat Electronics and Bharat Dynamics Limited. The missile was first tested on 12 November 2024.

=== Anti-ship variant ===
A report in early September 2024 suggested that a ship-launched anti-ship variant of the LR-LACM would be tested within 12-18 months. The test will conducted from the Universal Vertical Launcher Module (UVLM), which was originally developed by BrahMos Aerospace-L&T for delivering BrahMos missiles from Indian Naval Ships. This integration will reduce the changes required onboard the variety of ships which is already fitted with these launch systems. The development has begun with the testing of ITCM system for its sea-skimming capabilities in April 2024.

=== SLCM ===
The Submarine Launched Cruise Missile, abbreviated as SLCM, is the submarine-launched variant designed to launch from torpedo tubes of submarines. It is a compact version of Nirbhay missile. It has a stated range of 500 km, with a length of 5.6 meter, diameter of 505 mm (19.9 in), all up weight of 975 kg and Mach 0.7 speed. It would feature INS/GPS navigation, with an RF seeker for terminal guidance. There are plans to extend the missile's range to 800 km. During flight, SLCMs follow a low altitude trajectory. They skim close to the surface to stay out of the radar systems' altitude range. It comes with two variants: a Land attack cruise missile (LACM) and Anti-Ship Cruise Missile (ASCM). The warhead weight is reported to be around 250 kg (550 lb).

It is intended to be equip the Project-75 (I) and Project 76 submarines. The missile would be tested initially on Sindhughosh-class submarines. The missile is under development trial stage and is expected to be delivered around 2028–29.

== Testing ==
The first test flight of the missile was planned in October 2012, but the launch was postponed to December owing to the changes being made to the launcher. V. K. Saraswat, Director General & Scientific Adviser of DRDO, later said that the missile would be tested in February 2013. He said the delay was due to development of some processes. DRDO expected the missile to be ready for induction within 12 to 18 months after the February test. There were unconfirmed media reports that the missile would be scrapped due to multiple test failures but it was then reported that the project has been given an 18-month extension, till June 2018, to fix all outstanding issues. Nirbhay cruise missile has a single shot kill ratio of above 90 percent.

| Date/Time (IST) | Variant | Launch Site | Duration | Outcome | Image |
| Date/Time (IST) | Operator | Launch Site | Duration | Outcome | Image |
| Date/Time (IST) | Operator | Launch Site | Range | Function | Image |
| Date/Time (IST) | Details | | | | Image |
|---|---|---|---|---|---|
| 12 MARCH 2013 | Nirbhay | Integrated Test Range | 15 min | Partial Success | First trial of Nirbhay Long Range Cruise Missile (LRCM) launched at Chandipur, Odisha on March 12, 2013. |
| 12 MARCH 2013 | DRDO | Integrated Test Range | 1500 km | First test launch | First trial of Nirbhay Long Range Cruise Missile (LRCM) launched at Chandipur, Odisha on March 12, 2013. |
| 12 MARCH 2013 | The missile in its maiden flight was supposed to hit a static target situated 1500 km away in the Bay of Bengal. Missile took off from the launch pad successfully and reached the second stage of propulsion, traveling 15 minutes through its envisaged path at a speed of 0.7 mach. After that it veered away from its trajectory forcing the command center to detach the engine from the missile midway into the flight. This was done to avoid the risk of the missile hitting the coastal areas. The missile was purposely destroyed in mid-flight. The test was a partial success as the missile took off, reached the second stage of propulsion, and traveled 30% of its range and completed most of the mission objectives, before deviating from its path. DRDO has detected the problem which was a faulty inertial navigation system and corrected the same in subsequent tests. | | | | First trial of Nirbhay Long Range Cruise Missile (LRCM) launched at Chandipur, Odisha on March 12, 2013. |
| 17 OCT 2014 | Nirbhay | Integrated Test Range | 1 hour and 10 minutes | Success | |
| 17 OCT 2014 | DRDO | Integrated Test Range | >1500 km | Second test launch | |
| 17 OCT 2014 | (Initially scheduled for February–May 2014 but later delayed until October 2014 due to cyclone Hudhud) The missile test met all the parameters & completed all 15 way-points. The missile was tracked with the help of ground-based radars and its health parameters were monitored by telemetry stations from DRDO's ITR and LRDE (Electronics & Radar Development Establishment). An Indian Air Force SEPECAT Jaguar chased the missile during its flight to capture the video of the flight. | | | | |
| 16 OCT 2015 11:38 AM | Nirbhay | Integrated Test Range | 11 min | Failure | |
| 16 OCT 2015 11:38 AM | DRDO | Integrated Test Range | 128 km | Third test launch | |
| 16 OCT 2015 11:38 AM | The missile was to be tested for its low flying capability. The missile in flight was supposed to be brought down from 4800 meters to 20 meters gradually and in stages. A Su-30MKI aircraft videotaped the flight. A press release by the Ministry of Defence stated the missile was launched at 11:38 IST and all initial critical operations such as Booster ignition, Booster separation, Wing deployment and engine start were successfully executed and Nirbhay reached the desired Cruise Altitude. Although the take off was successful after repeated disruptions of countdown, the missile crashed into the Bay of Bengal 11 minutes into its flight after covering only 128 km of its 1500 km range. | | | | |
| 21 DEC 2016 11:56 AM | Nirbhay | Integrated Test Range | N/A | Failure | |
| 21 DEC 2016 11:56 AM | DRDO | Integrated Test Range | N/A | Fourth test launch | |
| 21 DEC 2016 11:56 AM | No official word on the test outcome, however according to news reports this test was not successful. The booster engine in the first stage started working and lifted the missile off from its launcher. But the missile started veering dangerously towards one side in two minutes after lift-off and veered outside its safety corridor. Due to this, the test was aborted and the missile was remotely destroyed. A potential reason for the failure was described as a hardware problem with one of the missile's component. | | | | |
| 7 NOV 2017 11:20 AM | Nirbhay | ITR Launch Complex 3 | 50 min | Success | Fifth successful trial flight tested on November 07, 2017. |
| 7 NOV 2017 11:20 AM | DRDO | ITR Launch Complex 3 | 647 km | Fifth test launch | Fifth successful trial flight tested on November 07, 2017. |
| 7 NOV 2017 11:20 AM | During the test, the missile traveled a distance of 647 km over a 50 minute duration, and was tracked by ground based radars and telemetry stations. This trial of the missile used a turbojet engine instead of a turbofan engine | | | | Fifth successful trial flight tested on November 07, 2017. |
| 15 APR 2019 | Nirbhay | Integrated Test Range | N/A | Success | |
| 15 APR 2019 | DRDO | Integrated Test Range | 650 km | Sixth test launch | |
| 15 APR 2019 | The test missile navigated way-points located at altitudes varying from 5 meters to 2.5 km. DRDO clarified that all mission objectives were met. The test also validated the terrain hugging and the sea skimming capability of the missile. This trial completed the developmental trials of the missile. The next set of trials would be conducted as per the requirements of the Indian Armed Forces. | | | | |
End of Nirbhay Programme; Start of ITCM Programme
| 12 OCT 2020 | ITCM | Integrated Test Range | 8 min | Failure | |
| 12 OCT 2020 | DRDO | Integrated Test Range | N/A | First ITCM trial | |
| 12 OCT 2020 | Fired for the first time with indigenously developed GTRE STFE MANIK turbofan engine. The test was aborted after 8 minutes of launch. As per DRDO, the missile deviated from predetermined flight path and was destroyed mid-air by mission control team. | | | | |
| 24 JUN 2021 | ITCM | ITR Launch Complex 3 | N/A | Success | |
| 24 JUN 2021 | DRDO | ITR Launch Complex 3 | 1500 km | Second ITCM trial | |
| 24 JUN 2021 | The successful test was conducted with the GTRE Manik engine paving the way for a full range test. | | | | |
| 11 AUG 2021 | ITCM | ITR Launch Complex 3 | N/A | Failure | |
| 11 AUG 2021 | DRDO | ITR Launch Complex 3 | 1500 km | Third ITCM trial | |
| 11 AUG 2021 | As per DRDO officials, MANIK engine performed well but the missile failed to achieve the desired range due to failure in control mechanism. | | | | |
| 28 OCT 2022 | ITCM | ITR Launch Complex 3 | N/A | Failure | |
| 28 OCT 2022 | DRDO | ITR Launch Complex 3 | N/A | Fourth ITCM trial | |
| 28 OCT 2022 | Test failed due to a snag in the engine after separation of booster stage. This test included an upgraded radio frequency seeker. | | | | |
| 21 FEB 2023 | ITCM | Integrated Test Range | N/A | Success | |
| 21 FEB 2023 | DRDO | Integrated Test Range | N/A | Fifth ITCM trial | |
| 21 FEB 2023 | ITCM was test fired successfully. Fitted with an upgraded radio frequency seeker and Manik engine. | | | | |
Start of SLCM Testing
| ?? FEB 2023 | SLCM | Integrated Test Range | N/A | Success | |
| ?? FEB 2023 | DRDO | Integrated Test Range | 402 km | First SLCM trial | |
| ?? FEB 2023 | In February 2023, the maiden successful trail of SLCM was conducted by DRDO, which met all the mission objectives with a range of 402 km. | | | | |
| 18 APR 2024 | ITCM | Integrated Test Range | N/A | Success | |
| 18 APR 2024 | DRDO | Integrated Test Range | N/A | Sixth ITCM trial | |
| 18 APR 2024 | The missile displayed very low altitude sea-skimming flight and used way point navigation to follow the intended course. The Manik STFE has proven to be dependable, as demonstrated by this successful flight test. To provide improved and dependable performance, the missile was additionally outfitted with updated avionics and software. The missile was followed by one of IAF's Sukhoi Su-30MKI jet to study the performance of the missile. This marked the beginning of the development of the anti-ship missile variant. | | | | |
Start of LR–LACM Testing
| 12 NOV 2024 | LR–LACM | Integrated Test Range | N/A | Success | |
| 12 NOV 2024 | DRDO | Integrated Test Range | N/A | First LRLACM trial | |
| 12 NOV 2024 | Maiden LR-LACM test from mobile articulated launcher. The test met the required objectives and followed the designated path using way point navigation and performed desired various manoeuvres while flying at various altitudes and speeds as per requirements. | | | | |
| 15 JUN 2026 | LR–LACM | Abdul Kalam Island (LC-IV, ITR) | N/A | Success | Successful test of LRLACM from Odisha coast on June 15, 2026. |
| 15 JUN 2026 | DRDO | Abdul Kalam Island (LC-IV, ITR) | N/A | Second LRLACM trial | Successful test of LRLACM from Odisha coast on June 15, 2026. |
| 15 JUN 2026 | DRDO conducted the successful test from the Launch Complex IV of the Integrated Test Range located on the Abdul Kalam Island off the coast of Odisha. The missile performance met all the objectives of the test which was tracked by various tracking instruments deployed by the Integrated Test Range, Chandipur. | | | | Successful test of LRLACM from Odisha coast on June 15, 2026. |

== Induction ==
As of November 2023, the Ministry of Defence is considering a proposal from one of the service for the induction of Nirbhay and is at an advance stage of discussion. Once cleared, all the three services of Indian Armed Forces will have Nirbhay in their arsenal. The Government of India already cleared the induction of Nirbhay in two services about two years ago.

The LRLACM received Acceptance of Necessity (AoN) from Defence Acquisition Council (DAC) for induction into Indian Air Force in August 2023. As of September 2024, the user trials and eventual induction of Nirbhay missiles are expected soon.

Trials of LRLACM of the Indian Army is expected to begin in 2025. As per reports by the Greek and Turkish media in late June 2025, India has unofficially offered the LR-LACM to the Hellenic Armed Forces.

Nirbhay, Pralay, Brahmos and Pinaka will become part of the Integrated Rocket Force, a separate entity from Strategic Forces Command. In February 2026, the MoD issued a request for information to initiate the process of acquiring submarine-launched land attack cruise missiles (LACMs) for the Indian Navy's fleet of conventional submarines. DRDO SLCM is reported to be a parallel development.

== Operators ==
India

- Indian Army
- Indian Air Force
- Indian Navy

== See also ==
- Kh-55 - Russia
- 3M14 -Russia
- BGM-109 Tomahawk - United States
- Hyunmoo-3 - South Korea
- CJ-10 - China
- HN-1/2/3 - China
- Otomat - Italy
- MdCN - UK, France, Italy
- List of missiles by country
- India and weapons of mass destruction
