= Tata LPTA =

Military truck produced in India

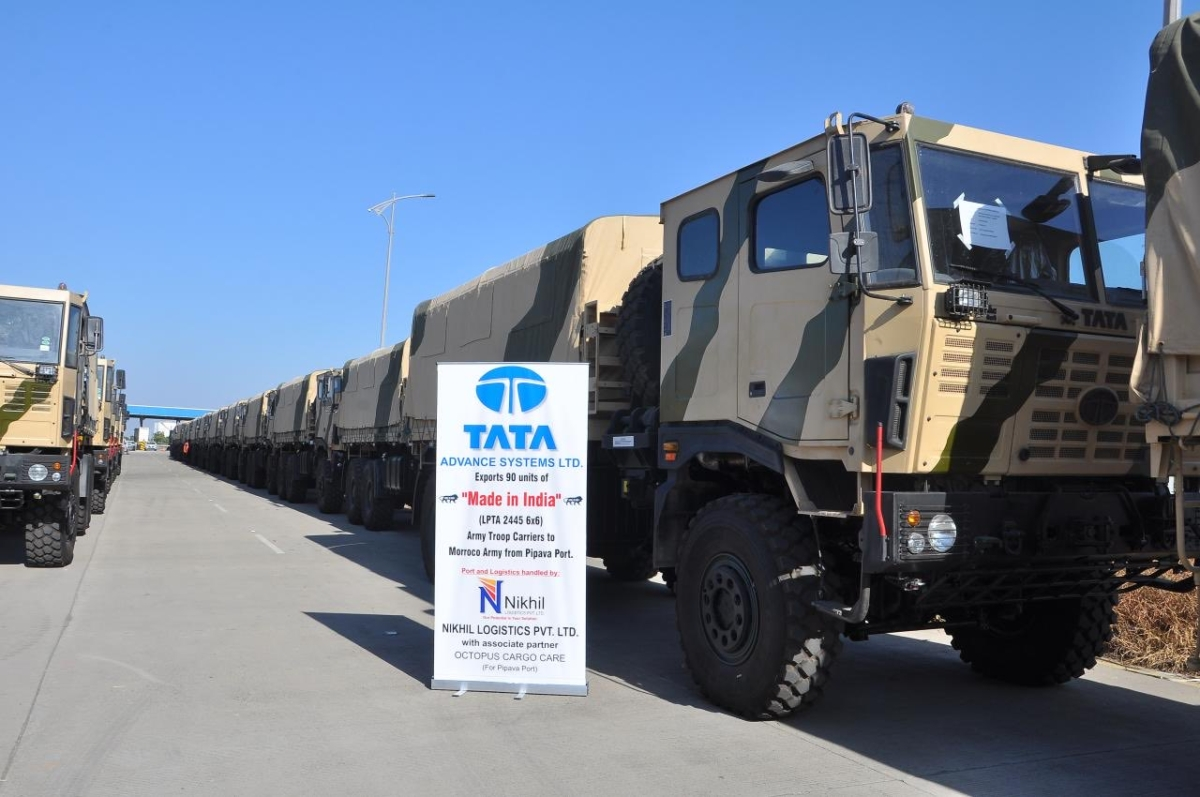
- Tata LPTA 2445 six-wheel drive for the Royal Moroccan Army
- Type: Heavy/medium tactical truck
- Place of origin: India

Service history
- In service: 2015–present
- Used by: Indian Army; Royal Moroccan Army

Production history
- Designer: Tata Motors
- Designed: 2012
- Manufacturer: Tata Motors
- Produced: 2015–present
- Variants: LPTA 716 4×4; LPTA 2038 6×6; LPTA 3138 8×8; LPTA 4545 10×10; LPTA 5252 12×12; Nirbhay, BrahMos, Prahaar missile transporter erector launcher

Specifications
- Mass: 23,000 kg (51,000 lb) (6×6); 27,200 kg (60,000 lb) (8×8)
- Crew: 2/4
- Armor: up-armour ready
- Engine: Cummins ISLe/ ISXe; 6-cylinder inline, water-cooled diesel 155 hp (116 kW) - 525 hp (391 kW)
- Payload capacity: 2.5 tons to 33 tons
- Transmission: Manual (6×6,8×8); Automatic (12×12)
- Suspension: Front: parabolic suspension Rear: semi-elliptical multi-leaf springs
- Fuel capacity: 400 L (106 US gal)
- Operational range: 600 km (loaded)
- Maximum speed: 80 km/h
- Steering system: Hydraulic power steering - pneumatically tiltable & adjustable telescopic steering column, air brakes

The Tata LPTA is a military truck family developed and produced by Indian manufacturer Tata Advanced Systems. The trucks are available in 4×4, 6×6, 8×8, 10×10 and 12×12 configurations. With extreme off-road capabilities, they are proposed as a replacement for the Czech-designed Tatra trucks currently used by the Indian Armed Forces.

== History ==
The Indian Army is one of the biggest users of Tatra trucks in the world, with over 10,000 trucks of various types in service. Because of their high-operational flexibility and functional adaptability they formed the backbone of the Army's tactical and mobilisation capability. These trucks were license-produced in India by BEML, a public sector company. Following the Tatra bribery scam, a ban was imposed on Tatra and the supply of these trucks stopped. Thus, the development of multi-axle tactical trucks was started by Tata to meet the Army's requirements.

== Design ==
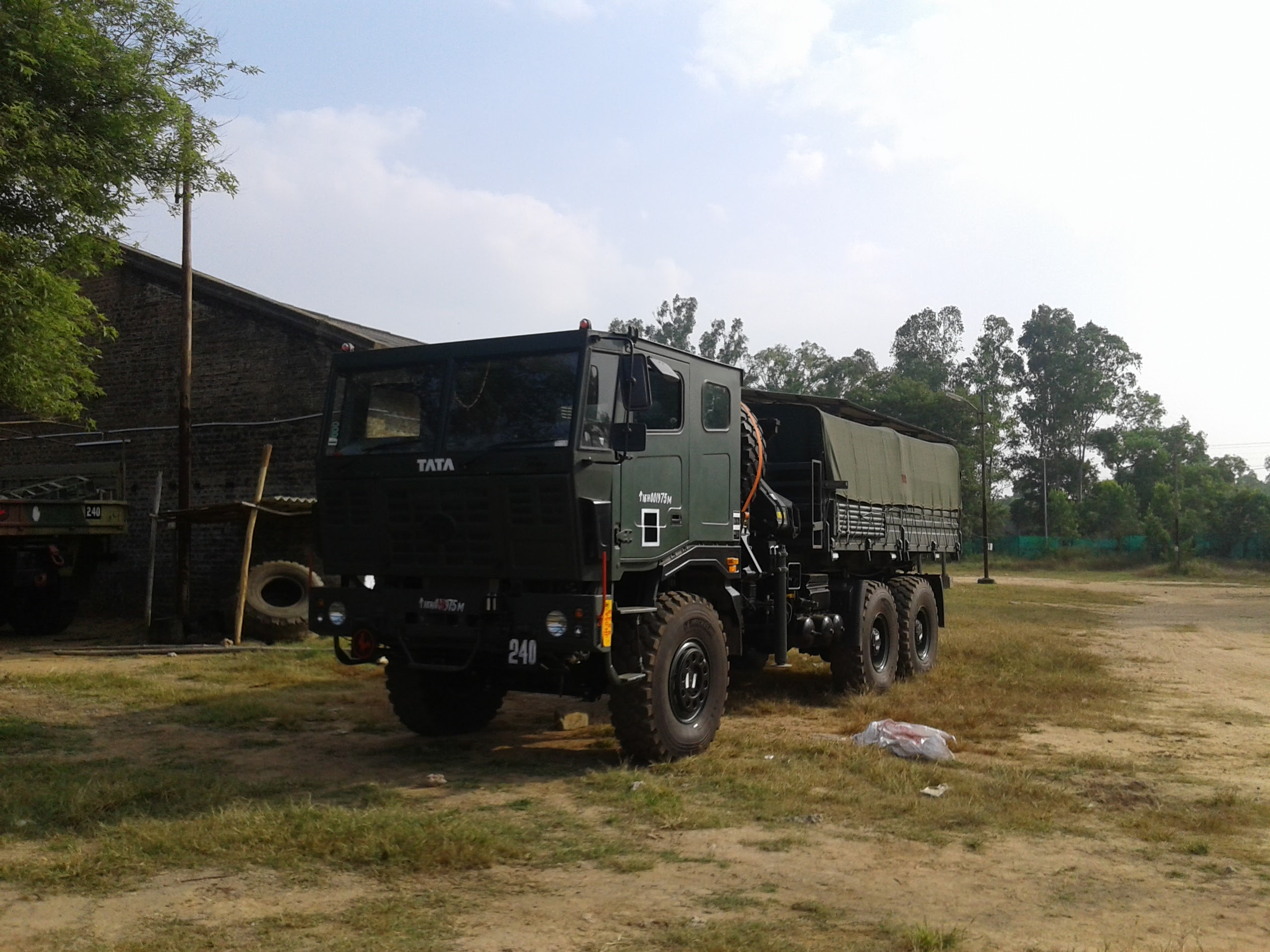
TATA LPTA 2038C

The vehicles have a cab over engine modular design. The cab can hold two crew and four passengers. There are two roof hatches for firing, observation and emergency exit. The trucks are equipped with a hydraulic crane for loading/unloading equipment. They come with a central tire inflation system which inflates/deflates tyres according to terrain requirements. For the driver's comfort, the cab is equipped with heat and air conditioning. There is a self recovery winch in the front as well.

The 6×6 and 8×8 variants are powered by a Cummins ISLe engine developing 375 horsepower, while the 12×12 variant comes with a Cummins ISXe engine with a maximum of 525 horsepower. The 4×4, 6×6, and 8×8 variants are mated to a 10 speed (9F+1R) manual transmission, while the 12×12 variant comes with an automatic transmission.

== Production ==
In July 2015, Tata won a contract for supplying 1,239 trucks of the 6×6 variant to the Indian Army. In March 2016, an additional order for 619 more trucks was placed. The total order was worth 1300 crores, making it the biggest order to a local private supplier.

The 8×8 variant has been proposed to be the platform for the upgraded BM-21 Grad MBRL. The Tata LPTA 5252 12×12 variant has been selected as a transporter erector launcher (TEL) for the Nirbhay/LR-LACM missile, BrahMos and Prahaar missile.

Around 15,000 trucks of the 4×4 variant are also in service with the Indian Army, all manufactured by the Vehicle Factory Jabalpur.

== Export ==
In January 2023, several reports confirmed that TATA had exported 92 units of the LPTA 2445 variant to the Royal Moroccan Army via Port Pipavav. The LPTA 2445 is a six-wheel drive military grade truck used for logisitics and munition transport purposes. The Moroccan variant has a 300 HP engine and a transport capacity of 10 tons. It can be also used for missile platform, mounted gun system, communication and radar system, command post, field artillery tractor with crew cabin, crash fire tender, fuel bowser, and HMV with material handling crane purposes.

== Specifications ==
Model	Drivetrain	Power	Cargo capacity	Gross weight	Variants	Notes
713	4×4	115.5 kW (154.9 hp)	2,500 kg (5,500 lb)	7,750 kg (17,090 lb)		
1628	4×4	198 kW (266 hp) @ 2500 rpm		7,750 kg (17,090 lb)	5 KL fuel & water bowser, 5T recovery, refrigeration truck, troop carrier, command post	
1826	6×6	336 kW (451 hp)	7.5T tow	13,945 kg (30,743 lb)	Missile platform, mounted gun system, communication and radar system, command post, field artillery tractor with crew cabin, crash fire tender, fuel bowser, HMV with material handling crane	
2038	6×6	375 kW (503 hp) @ 2100 rpm	10,500 kg (23,100 lb)	23,000 kg (51,000 lb)	7 KL refueler system, CGT, HMV with MHC, GRAD BM 21 rocket launcher, tactical communication system	
3138	8×8	276 kW (370 hp)	18,000 kg (40,000 lb)	27,200 kg (60,000 lb)	Missile launcher and carrier (Akash ASL), bridge laying system, command post and communication system, truck mounted gun, HMV with MHC	
3945	8×8	336 kW (451 hp)			Missile launcher and carrier (Akash ASL), bridge laying system, command post and communication system, truck mounted gun, HMV with MHC	
4545	10×10	336 kW (451 hp)			Missile launcher and carrier (Barak 8), bridge laying system, command post and communication system, truck mounted gun, truck mounted crane	
5252	12×12	525 kW (704 hp)	33,000 kg (73,000 lb)	53,800 kg (118,600 lb)	TEL for Nirbhay/LR-LACM missile, BrahMos and Prahaar missile	
