= DRDO Ghatak =

Indian autonomous combat aerial vehicle

Ghatak
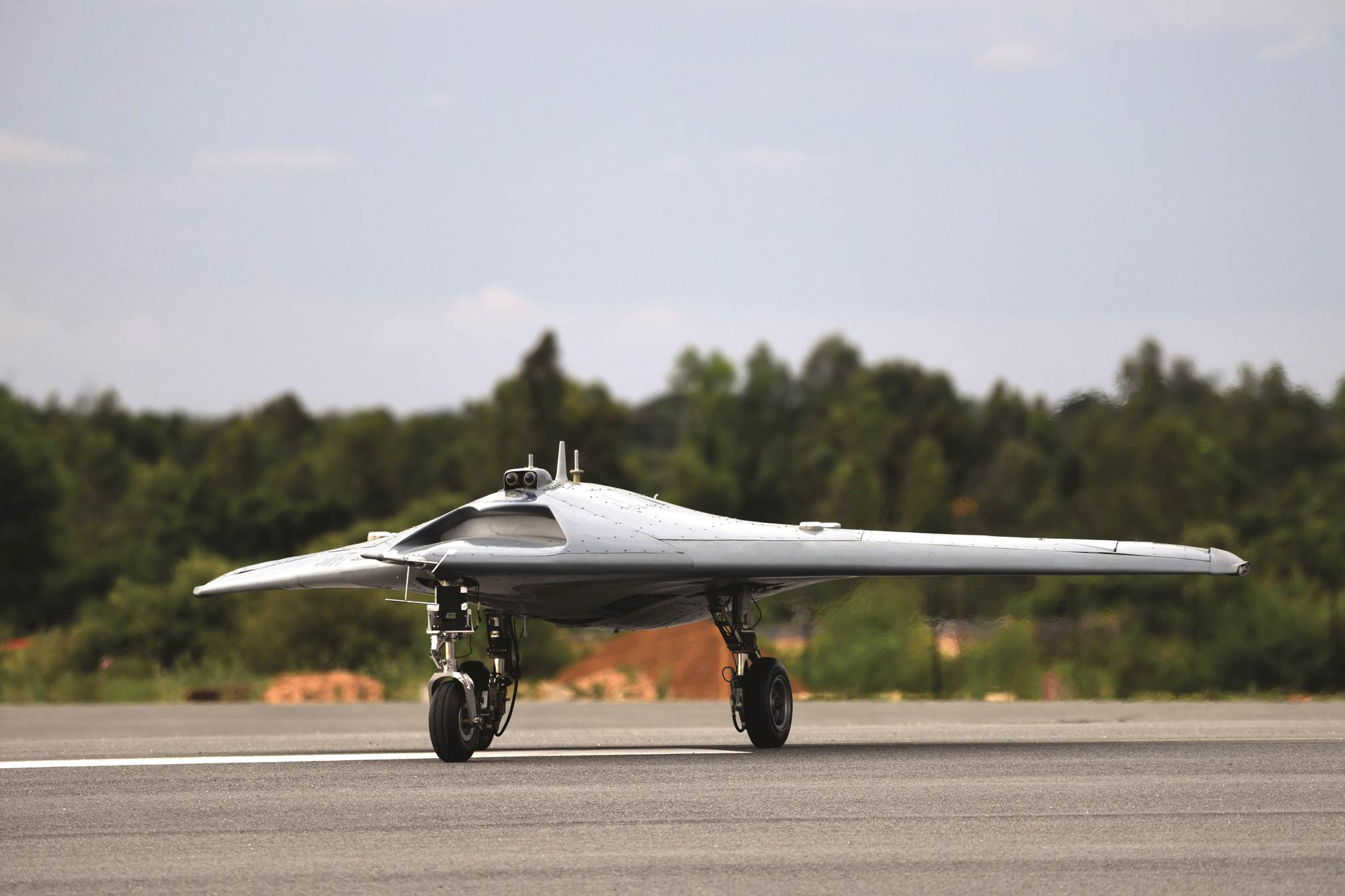
- Autonomous Flying Wing Technology Demonstrator, a subscale version, used as a technology demonstrator for DRDO Ghatak

General information
- Type: Stealth Unmanned Combat aerial Vehicle
- National origin: India
- Designer: Aeronautical Development Agency; Aeronautical Development Establishment
- Status: Under development
- Number built: 2 downscale prototypes

History
- First flight: 1 July 2022 (prototype)

Ghatak (pronounced: gʰɑːt̪ək; lit. 'Deadly' in Sanskrit) (Note: from Hindi/Sanskrit 'घातक' (romanised: ghātaka) meaning 'killer', 'deadly'), earlier designated as Indian Unmanned Strike Air Vehicle, is an autonomous jet powered unmanned combat aerial vehicle (UCAV), being developed by Aeronautical Development Establishment of the Defence Research and Development Organisation for the Indian Armed Forces. The design work on the UCAV is carried out by the Aeronautical Development Agency of the Ministry of Defence. The UCAV's design is based on a flying-wing concept and it is powered by a turbofan engine. It is expected to have internal weapons bay capable of carrying missiles, bombs and precision-guided munitions. The first flight of a scaled down prototype was carried out in July 2022, with further tests in 2023.

== Design and development ==
=== Background and planning ===
The Autonomous Unmanned Research Aircraft project was commissioned in 2009 to carryout a feasibility study for the development of an unmanned combat aerial vehicle (UCAV) for the Indian Armed Forces. It was taken up by the Aeronautical Development Establishment (ADE) of the state-run Defence Research and Development Organisation (DRDO). In July 2010, the Indian Air Force submitted a request for information to international suppliers for UCAVs with a low-radar cross-section, high service ceiling, an expected range of 500 nmi (930 km; 580 mi) and the capability to carry precision-guided weapons. In 2016, a project to develop a scaled down technology demonstrator named Stealth Wing Flying Testbed (SWiFT), was sanctioned at a cost of ₹700 million (equivalent to ₹1.1 billion or US$11 million in 2026). The ADE was tasked with the development of this scaled down prototype, and according to the DRDO, the SWiFT is intended to develop and demonstrate technologies for controlling the flying-wing configuration and flight characteristics at high-subsonic speeds.

=== SWiFT protypes ===
Maiden flight of SWiFT on 1 July 2022

Two prototypes were developed, with the first prototype featuring a flying-wing design with no tail fin, while the second featured a vertical stabilizer. The ground trials of the SWiFT Unmanned Aerial Vehicle (UAV) began in June 2021. The airframe, undercarriage, flight control system, and avionics for the UAV were developed indigenously. The second prototype, which was designated as the Autonomous Flying Wing Technology Demonstrator, was tested successfully on 1 July 2022. According to DRDO, the aircraft performed as intended while operating in a fully autonomous mode. The SWiFT UAV has an airframe made of carbon composites, and is 4 m (13 ft)-long and has a wingspan of 5 m (16 ft). It weighed about 1 t (1.1 tons), and was powered by a Russian TRDD-50MT turbofan engine, originally designed for cruise missiles. The SWiFT was also intended to be a precursor to the unmanned wingman bomber program.

=== Developmental testing ===
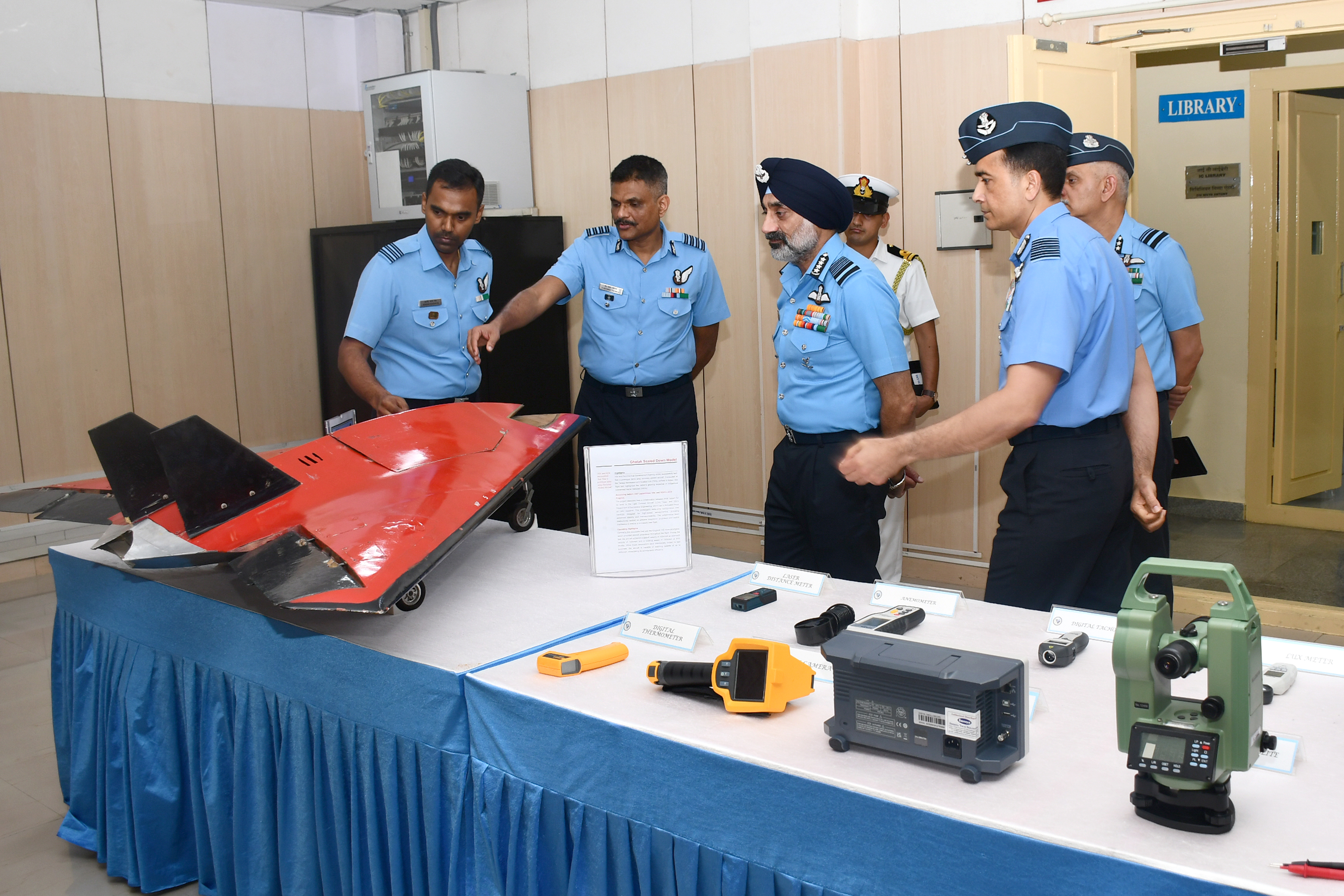
Air Chief Marshal Amar Preet Singh inspecting the scale model in 2025

The DRDO subsequently conducted six developmental test flights of the UAV in 2023. The seventh test flight was conducted at the Chitradurga Aeronautical Test Range in December 2023, with the final configuration. It involved an upgraded prototype with no tail fin, improved avionics and control systems, and featured an advanced ground control station. With the use of onboard sensor data and GPS-aided GEO augmented navigation, the testing demonstrated autonomous landing without the requirement of ground based radars or manual control. According to the DRDO, the various tests were used to test high-speed automatic takeoff and landing, stealth characteristics, control of the flying wing configuration, autonomous flying, and integration of monitoring and evaluation systems.

=== Project Ghatak ===
The UCAV project had been designated as project Ghatak. According to a press release in 2017, an initial funding of ₹23,100 crore (US$3.44 billion) was allocated in 2016 for the lead-in design of Project Ghatak and development of critical technologies for the Ghatak and Advanced Medium Combat Aircraft. While it primarily intended for the Indian Air Force, the Indian Navy also expressed interested in the project, and is keen on acquiring deck based UCAVs for aircraft carriers and Landing Platform Docks. The Technology Perspective and Capability Roadmap 2025 of the defence ministry cited the possible acquisition of up to 100 units of stealth UCAVs for the Indian Air Force and up to 50 units for the Indian Army. The acquisition of Ghatak UCAVs is also outlined in the Vision 2047 of the Indian Air Force.

On 3 March 2026, the Defence Procurement Board cleared the development phase of the Ghatak Project, and recommended the acquisition of 60 Ghatak drones, the proposal of which has to be approved by the Defence Acquisition Council led by the defence minister. On 27 March 2026, the Defence Acquisition Council, chaired by the Defence Minister, cleared the procurement of 60 Remotely Piloted Strike Aircraft (RPSA). The RPSA programme, which was earlier designated as project Ghatak, would be implemented under the Development cum Production Partner programme by the DRDO, at an estimated cost of ₹39,000 crore (US$4.0 billion). The winning bidder is expected to develop six prototypes at a cost of ₹10,000 crore (US$1.0 billion), and the UCAVs, which would be based on the Ghatak protoypes, are expected to be powered by jet engines and equipped with Astra long-range air-to-air missiles and air-to-ground systems being developed by the DRDO.

== Design ==
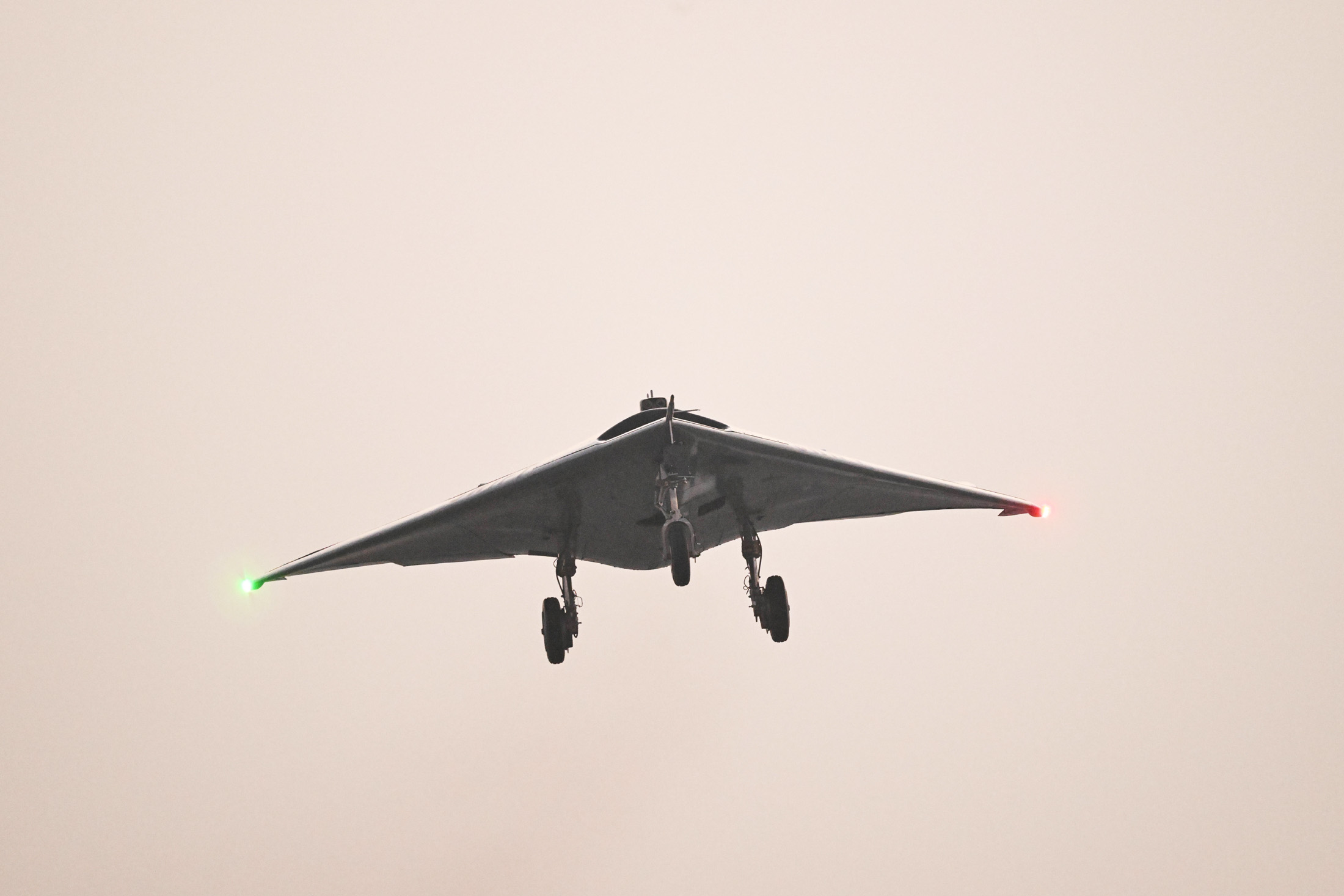
The Ghatak will feature a flying-wing design similar to the prototype (pictured)

The Ghatak is an autonomous jet powered UCAV. The aircraft will feature a carbon composite frame with stealth characteristics and will be powered by a variant of the Kaveri afterburning turbofan engine. It will have a flying wing configuration, designed by the Aeronautical Development Agency (ADA). It will be developed in a public–private partnership. The flight control system and data link packages would be developed by the ADA and Defence Electronics Application Laboratory. As per the DRDO, the UCAV will be highly intelligent drones with on-board mission computers, fire control radars, identification of friend or foe, and collision avoidance systems. It would weigh less than 15 t (15 long tons; 17 short tons), and would have a flying ceiling of 9,100 m (30,000 ft). The aircraft will have a capability to carry various missiles, bombs and precision guided munitions.

== Specifications ==
General characteristics

- Crew: 0
- Length: 14 m (45 ft 11 in)
- Wingspan: 18 m (59 ft 1 in)
- Empty weight: 8,150 kg (17,968 lb)
- Fuel capacity: 3,700 kg (8,200 lb)
- Powerplant: 1 × GTRE GTX-35VS Kaveri Dry variant

Performance

- Maximum speed: Mach 0.9
- Endurance: 5-8 hours
- Service ceiling: 9,100 m (30,000 ft)
- Range: 1,000 km (620 mi)

Armament
1,500 kg (3,300 lb) weapons in Internal weapons bay

- Bombs
  - DRDO SAAW
  - DRDO Glide Bombs
  - Sudarshan LGB
- Air to ground munitions
  - ULPGM
  - Rudram (missile)
  - BrahMos-NG
- Air to Air munitions
  - Astra (missile)

== See also ==
Related development

- DRDO Rustom

Aircraft of comparable role, configuration and era

- BAE Taranis
- Boeing Phantom Ray
- Boeing X-45
- Dassault nEUROn
- Mikoyan Skat
- Lockheed Martin Polecat
- Northrop Grumman X-47
- Sukhoi S-70 Okhotnik
- TAI Anka-3
