= Gas Turbine Research Establishment =

Indian military laboratory

Coordinates: 12°58′44″N 77°35′30″E

- Former name: Gas Turbine Research Centre (GTRC)
- Established: 1959
- Budget: ~$400 million for Kaveri(by 2025)
- Field of research: Aerogas turbine technology
- Director: Shri. Dr. S V Ramana Murthy
- Location: Kanpur, till 1961 Bengaluru, Karnataka, India
- Operating agency: Defence Research and Development Organisation
- Website: GTRE

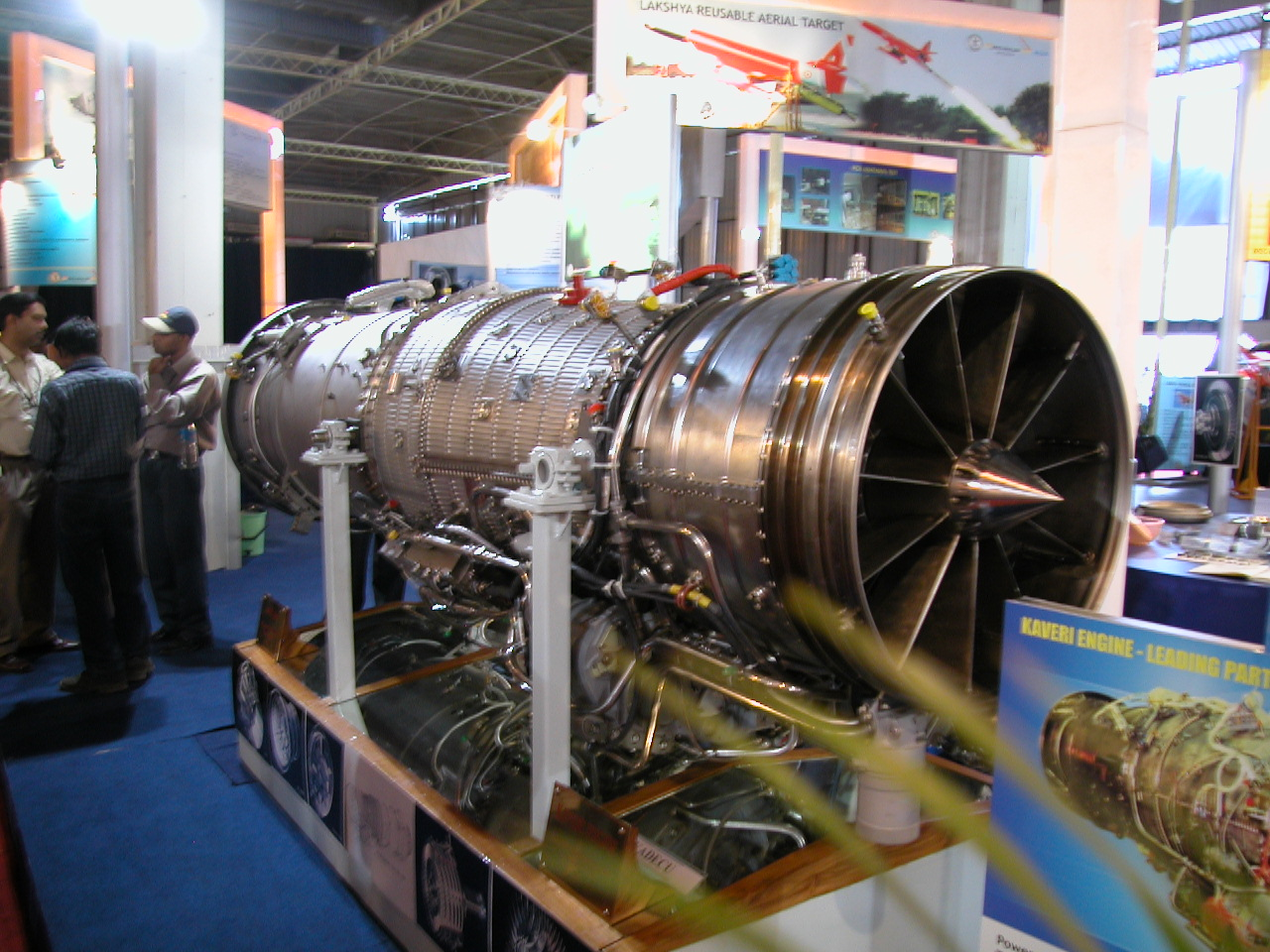
GTRE GTX-35VS Kaveri

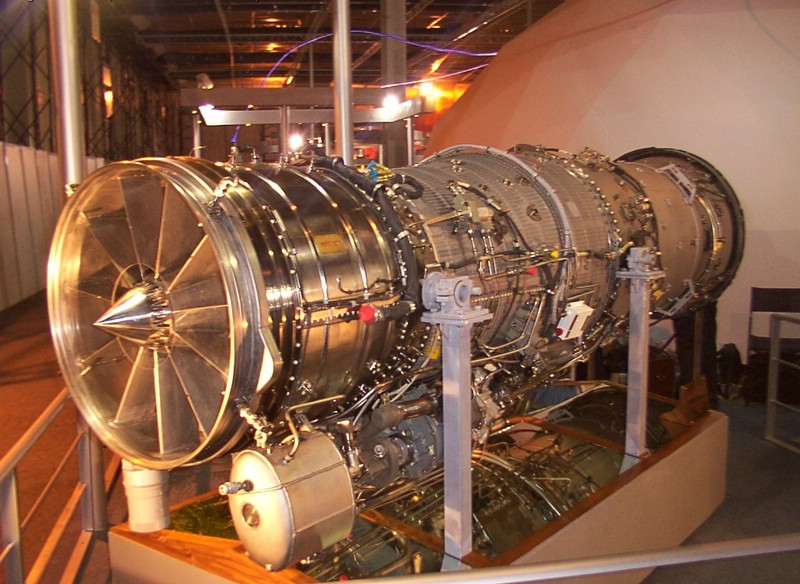
GTRE GTX-35VS Kaveri

Gas Turbine Research Establishment (GTRE) is a laboratory of the Defence Research and Development Organisation (DRDO). Located in Bengaluru, its primary function is research and development of aero gas-turbines for military aircraft. As a spin-off effect, GTRE has also been developing marine gas-turbines for the Indian Navy.

It was initially known as GTRC (Gas Turbine Research Centre), created in 1959 in No.4 BRD Air Force Station, Kanpur, Uttar Pradesh. In November 1961 it was brought under the DRDO, renamed to GTRE and moved to Bengaluru, Karnataka. The GTRE has consistently faced public criticism for failing to develop an indigenous jet engine for Indian fighter aircraft even after significant cost overruns and delays.

As of 2025, reports suggest that it has concluded work on the Kaveri Derivative Engine (KDE), and is awaiting dry thrust certification for an indigenous jet engine for the Ghatak UCAV.

== Products ==
Principal achievements of Gas Turbine Research Establishment include:

- Design and development of India's "first centrifugal type 10 kN thrust engine" between 1959 and 1961.
- Design and development of a "1700K reheat system" for the Orpheus 703 engine to boost its power. The redesigned system was certified in 1973.
- Successful upgrade of the reheat system of the Orpheus 703 to 2000K.
- Improvement of the Orpheus 703 engine by replacing "the front subsonic compressor stage" with a "transonic compressor stage" to increase the "basic dry thrust" of the engine.
- Design and development of a "demonstrator" gas turbine engine—GTX 37-14U—for fighter aircraft. Performance trials commenced in 1977 and the "demonstrator phase" was completed in 1981. The GTX 37-14U was "configured" and "optimized" to build a "low by-pass ratio jet engine" for "multirole performance aircraft". This engine was dubbed GTX 37-14U B.

=== GTX Kaveri ===
GTX-35VS Kaveri engine was intended to power production models of HAL Tejas.

Defending the program GTRE mentioned reasons for delay including:

- Non availability of state of the art wind tunnel facility in India
- The technology restrictions imposed by US by placing it in "entities" list

Both hurdles having been cleared, GTRE intended to continue work on the AMCA (future generation fighter craft).

This program was abandoned in 2014.

=== Kaveri Marine Gas Turbine (KMGT) ===
Kaveri Marine Gas Turbine is a design spin-off from the Kaveri engine, designed for Indian combat aircraft. Using the core of the Kaveri engine, GTRE added low-pressure compressor and turbine as a gas generator and designed a free power turbine to generate shaft power for maritime applications.

The involvement of Indian Navy in the development and testing of the engine has given a tremendous boost to the programme. The base frame for KMGT was developed by private sector company, Larsen & Toubro (L&T). The 12 MW of shaft power has been demonstrated by the Kaveri Marine Gas Turbine at the Naval Dockyard in Visakhapatnam.

The KMGT was tested on the Marine Gas Turbine test bed, an Indian Navy facility at Vishakhapatnam. The engine has been tested to its potential of 12 MW at ISA SL 35 °C condition, a requirement of the Navy to propel SNF class ships, such as the Rajput class destroyers.

=== Ghatak engine ===
The engine for DRDO Ghatak will be a 52-kilonewton dry variant of the Kaveri aerospace engine and will be used in the UCAV (Unmanned Combat Aerial Vehicles). The Government of India has cleared a funding of ₹2,650 crores ($394 Million) for the project.

=== Manik engine ===
Small Turbofan Engine (STFE), also known as Manik engine, is a 4.5 kN thrust turbofan engine developed by GTRE to power Nirbhay series cruise missile and under development UAVs, Long range Anti-ship and Land Attack cruise missile systems. In October 2022, STFE was successfully flight tested.

DRDO is currently on search for a private production partner to mass-produce Manik engine. It is estimated that 300 units will be produced over the course of five years. This amount could be allocated to the GTRE-identified industries. An Expression of Interest (EOI) will first identify two industries to supply three engines each over the course of eighteen months. After that, an RFI for mass production quantities will be issued.

In April 2024, the DRDO designed Indigenous Technology Cruise Missile (ITCM), which incorporates the Manik engine, was successfully tested. In July 2024, ABI Showatech India Pvt Ltd was awarded the contract to supply Casting Vane Low-Pressure Turbine (LPNGV) subcomponent of the engine as a part of the cruise missile programme. The low pressure turbine is "responsible for extracting energy from the exhaust gases to drive the fan and other compressor stages."

The current STFE production plant is located near Thiruvananthapuram International Airport in Kerala for Limited Series Production for testing purpose of Nirbhay cruise missile.

=== Advanced Turbo Gas Generator ===
On 23 May 2024, the Ministry of Defence (MoD) awarded Azad Engineering Limited a contract to serve as a single source industry partner for the advanced turbo gas generator (ATGG) engines designed by the Gas Turbine Research Establishment. The contract includes end-to-end manufacturing, assembly and integration of completely-assembled engines. The ATGG is designed with a single-spool compact turbojet configuration with components including a 4-stage axial flow compressor, an annular combustor, a single-stage axial flow uncooled turbine, and a fixed exit area nozzle. The first batch of the engine would be delivered in early 2026. The engine will power the NASM-MR missile.

The first ATGG indigenous expendable turbojet engine with a thrust class of 350 kgf (3.4 kN) was delivered on 22 July 2026.

== Manufacturing ==
During May 2024, GTRE had long term plans to develop an Advanced Gas Turbine Engine (AGTE) with various defense applications including the gas turbine engine that powers the Indian Army's fleet of infantry combat vehicles (ICVs) and tanks, the marine gas turbine engine (MGTE) for upcoming Indian Navy warships, and the GTX-35VS Kaveri turbofan engine for the Tejas fighter. By early 2026, Azad must begin delivering its first batch of fully integrated engines.

In 2024, discussions began between Safran, a French defence and aerospace company, and DRDO's Aeronautical Development Agency and GTRE for future technology transfer and manufacturing of jet engines for India's 5th generation Advanced Medium Combat Aircraft (AMCA) programme.

=== Industry collaboration ===
For the Combat Aircraft Engine Development Program, PTC Industries Limited, a titanium recycling and aerospace component forging company has taken up a developmental contract for essential components on 6 December 2022. GTRE is expanding PTC Industries' capacity to produce vital titanium alloy aero engine and aircraft parts through investment casting – hot isostatic pressing technology. In cooperation with GTRE, a prototype of the Engine Bevel Pinion Housing has already been developed.

On 7 January 2026, GTRE issued an Expression of Interest (EoI) to select a Development-cum-Production Partner for manufacturing and assembly of an indigenous Advanced High Thrust Class Engine (AHTCE), aiming industrial ecosystem supporting lifecycle military gas turbine engines. The engine will be equipped with FADEC and the programme includes the delivery of 18 engines over a 10 year span. The programme will be divided into four major phases: Design, Manufacturing Planning, Manufacturing and Assembly and Integration Phase. A foreign design agency, like Safran Aircraft Engines, Rolls-Royce Holdings, General Electric and IHI Corporation, could participate as consultancy firms but the design control would be with the Indian partner. The new engine will be of the 120 kN (27,000 lb_{f}) thrust class.

== Jet engine development criticism ==
GTRE has been frequently criticised for its failure to develop an indigenous jet engine for fighter aircraft, a project the laboratory has been working on since 1982. As of 2023, GTRE has not been able to overcome its engine development issues regarding metallurgy for turbine blades and other engine blade technologies, lack of a flying testbed and wind tunnel to validate engines above a 90 Kilo Newton (KN) thrust.
