= GTRE GTX-35VS Kaveri =

Afterburning turbofan aircraft engine

GTX-35VS Kaveri
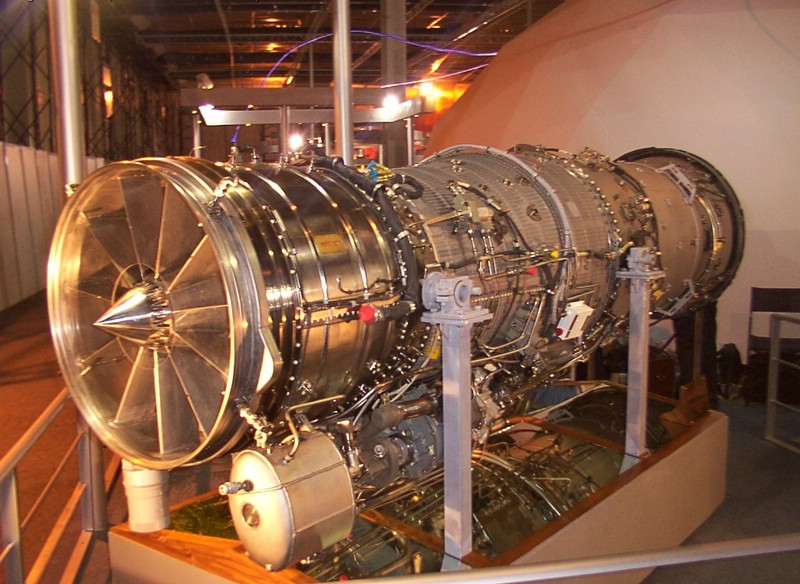
- GTRE GTX-35VS engine on display
- Type: Afterburning turbofan
- National origin: India
- Manufacturer: Gas Turbine Research Establishment; Godrej & Boyce
- First run: 1996
- Major applications: DRDO Ghatak
- Number built: 11 engines, 4 cores

The GTRE GTX-35VS Kaveri is an afterburning turbofan project under development by the Gas Turbine Research Establishment (GTRE), a lab under the Defence Research and Development Organisation (DRDO) in Bengaluru, India. An Indian design, the Kaveri was originally intended to power production models of the HAL Tejas developed by Hindustan Aeronautics Limited. However, the Kaveri programme failed to satisfy the necessary technical requirements on time and was officially delinked from the Tejas programme in September 2008. As of 2025, a dry variant of the Kaveri engine is now being developed to power the DRDO Ghatak.

== History ==
=== Programme ===
In 1986, the Indian Defence Ministry's Defence Research and Development Organisation (DRDO) was authorized to launch a programme to develop an indigenous powerplant for the Light Combat Aircraft. It had already been decided early in the LCA programme to equip the prototype aircraft with the General Electric F404-GE-F2J3 afterburning turbofan engine, but if this parallel program was successful, it was intended to equip the production aircraft with this indigenous engine.

The DRDO assigned the lead development responsibility to its Gas Turbine Research Establishment (GTRE), which had some experience in developing jet engines. It had developed the GTX37-14U after-burning turbojet, which first ran in 1977, and was the first jet engine to be designed entirely in India. A turbofan derivative, the GTX37-14UB, followed. The GTRE returned to turbojet technology with the greatly redesigned, but unsatisfactory, GTX-35.

For the LCA programme, the GTRE would again take up a turbofan design which it designated the GTX-35VS "Kaveri" (named after the Kaveri River). Full-scale development was authorized in April 1989 in what was then expected to be a 93-month programme projected to cost ₹382.21 crore (equivalent to ₹45 billion or US$460 million in 2026). The project was expected to be completed by December 1996. A new engine typically costs up to $2 billion to develop, according to engine industry executives.

=== Development timeline ===
==== 1990s ====
The original plans called for 17 prototype test engines to be built. The first test engine consisted of only the core module (named "Kabini", a major tributary and often cited starting point of the Kaveri river), while the third engine was the first example fitted with variable stator vanes on the first three compressor stages. The Kabini core engine first ran in March 1995. Test runs of the first complete prototype Kaveri began in 1996 and all five ground-test examples were in testing by 1998; the initial flight tests were planned for the end of 1999, with its first test flight in an LCA prototype to follow the next year. However, progress in the Kaveri development programme was slowed by both political and technical difficulties. There had been some difficulties in the development due to the sanctions imposed on India after 1998 Pokhran tests. (Note: There was much criticism concerning the DRDO's planning schedules for various elements of the LCA programme, most particularly for the Kaveri development effort. France's Snecma, with over half a century of successful jet engine development experience, took nearly 13 years to bring the Rafale fighter's M88 engine to low-volume production after bench testing had begun; a similar timespan for the less-experienced GTRE would see Kaveri production beginning no earlier than 2009.)

==== 2000s ====
In 2002, little information had been publicly released concerning the nature of the Kaveri's technical challenges, but it was known that the Kaveri had a tendency to fail turbine blades, which required procuring blades from Snecma (as well as digital engine control systems).

Continuing development problems with the Kaveri resulted in the 2003 decision to procure the uprated F404-GE-IN20 engine for the eight pre-production Limited Series Production (LSP) aircraft and two naval prototypes. The ADA awarded General Electric a US$105 million contract in February 2004 for development engineering and production of 17 F404-IN20 engines, delivery of which is to begin in 2006.

In mid-2004, the Kaveri failed its high-altitude tests in Russia, ending the last hopes of introducing it with the first production Tejas aircraft. This unfortunate development led the Indian Ministry of Defence (MoD) to order 40 more IN20 engines in 2005 for the first 20 production aircraft, and to openly appeal for international participation in completing development of the Kaveri. In February 2006, the ADA awarded a contract to Snecma for technical assistance in working out the Kaveri's problems.

In December 2004, it was revealed that the GTRE had spent over ₹13 billion (equivalent to ₹50 billion or US$521.9 million in 2026) on developing the Kaveri. Furthermore, the Cabinet Committee on Security judged that the Kaveri would not be installed on the LCA before 2012, and revised its estimate for the projected total development cost to ₹28.39 billion (equivalent to ₹110 billion or US$1 billion in 2026).

In April 2005, M. Natarajan, Scientific Adviser to the Defence Minister told The Hindu that "there is good progress" on the development of the Kaveri engine. "We are planning to integrate a prototype Kaveri engine into one of the LCA prototypes sometime in 2007 to understand the nuances of such a complex power-pack," he further told The Hindu.

In February 2006, the US experts told PTI that "Kaveri is truly a world-class engine." "We are ready to join in partnership with the Defence Research and Development Organisation to make Kaveri work," General William J Begert of Pratt & Whitney, told PTI. But DRDO Secretary Natrajan told PTI that "But Kaveri is and would remain an Indian project."

On 5 February 2007, Scientific Adviser to Defense Minister M Natarajan said nearly 90 to 93 per cent of the expected performance had been realized and the government had recently floated an expression of interest to seek partners to move the programme further. Till 11 February 2008, Kaveri had undergone 1,700 hours of tests and has been sent twice to Russia to undergo high-altitude tests for which India has no facility. The engine is also being tested to power the next generation of Unmanned Aerial Vehicles.

In July 2007, GTRE divided Kaveri program into two separate programs. They are K9+ Program and K10 Program. K9+ Program is a program to prove concept of complete design and gain hand-on experience of aircraft engine integration and flight trials to cover a defined truncated flight envelope prior to the launch of production version of K10 Standard engine. While K10 Program is a joint venture (JV) partnership with a foreign engine manufacturer. K10 program engine will be final production standard Kaveri engine and shall have less weight and more reheat thrust along with certain other changes to meet the original design intent.

In July 2008, a press release announced a development of modified Kaveri Marine Gas Turbine (KMGT) to propel Indian Navy warships. It was already demonstrated to the then Prime Minister Dr Manmohan Singh. The turbine was tested for a power rating of 12 MW at ISA SL 35 °C condition. The testing took place in Indian Navy's Naval Dock Yard, Visakapatnam's Marine Gas Turbine test bed facility which is capable of testing the Gas Turbines up to 25 MW of shaft power.

In September 2008, it was announced that the Kaveri would not be ready in time for the Tejas, and that an in-production powerplant would have to be selected. Development of the Kaveri by the GTRE would continue for other future applications. It was announced in November 2008 that the Kaveri engine will be installed on LCA by December 2009, apparently for tests only.

In February 2009, it was published in FlightGlobal that the GTRE had spent ₹20 billion (equivalent to ₹55 billion or US$570.0 million in 2026) in developing the Kaveri engine since 1989, but the power-plant is still overweight and does not have the 21,000–22,500 lb_{f} (93–100 kN) of thrust that its customer requires. Natarajan told FlightGlobal that the programme will not be scrapped. "A team of air force engineers is working with GTRE and ADA in addressing the issues. As an ongoing project, the air force will be involved at the point of integrating the upgraded version of the engine with the aircraft," he told Flightglobal. "Discussions with Snecma have been going on for two years," he further adds. "Development and flight-testing of the new engine will take at least five to six years."

In December 2009, Kaveri-Snecma JV was trying Back-door Entry in LCA. The People's Post reported that GTRE has agreed to de-link Kaveri from LCA, but has put in a proposal that when the first 40 GE F-404 engines in the initial two squadrons of the LCA for the IAF, get phased out should be replaced by the Kaveri-Snecma engine, in future.

==== 2010s ====
As of 3 May 2010, about 1,880 hours of engine test had been completed on various prototypes of Kaveri Engine. A total of eight Kaveri Engines and four core engines have been manufactured, assembled and tested. High Altitude testing on core engine has been completed successfully.

In June 2010, the Kaveri engine based on Snecma's new core, an uprated derivative of the M88-2 engine that powers the French Rafale fighter, providing 19,000–19,000 lb_{f} (83–85 kN) of maximum thrust is being considered an option by DRDO.

A press release in August 2010, stated that GTRE with the help of Central Institute of Aviation Motors (CIAM) of Russia is trying to match objective of fine tuning of Kaveri engine performance. Until August 2010, one major milestone which is altitude testing, simulating Kaveri engine performance at different altitude and achieving speed of Mach 1 had been completed successfully. One of Kaveri prototype (K9) was successfully flight tested at Gromov Flight Research Institute in Moscow, on 4 November 2010. The test was conducted with the testbed aircraft at Gromov, with the engine running right from the take-off to landing, flying for a period of over one hour up to an altitude of 6,000 m (20,000 ft). The engine helped the Il-76 aircraft test bed fly at speeds of 0.6 Mach in its maiden flight, according to the Defence Research and Development Organisation (DRDO). It was revealed that in the next few months 50-60 test flights would be carried out. During that timeframe, 27 flights encompassing 57 hours of duration was completed.

"The engine control, performance and health during the flight were found to be excellent. With this test, Kaveri engine has completed a major milestone of development programme," it added. After completing these milestone Kaveri engine is flight-worthy. The Kaveri engine was tested for the first time on a flying testbed and the trials were a success.

Till April 2011, the first phase of Kaveri engine FTB trials have been completed successfully and further tests will continue from May 2011 onwards. The flight tests successfully carried out so far are up to 12 km (39,000 ft) maximum altitude and a maximum forward speed of 0.7 Mach.

In its annual report for 2010–11, The Comptroller and Auditor General (CAG) noted that ₹18.92 billion (equivalent to ₹43 billion or US$441.8 million in 2026) had been spent on development, with only two out of the six milestones prescribed having been met as of July 2009. Among its deficiencies, CAG says the engine weight was higher than the design specifications, being 1,235 kg (2,723 lb) against 1,100 kg (2,400 lb), though the weight of first prototype, K1 was at 1,423.78 kg (3,138.9 lb) initially. There was no progress on developing the compressor, turbine and engine control systems. The developmental deadline was progressively delayed from 1996 to 2000 to 2004 and finally 2009. After missing the 2009 deadline, GTRE initiated a process of foreign collaboration. Only 2 engines had been upgraded to K9+ standard.

In August 2010, regarding the reasons for delay, a Ministry of Defence press release reported:

1. "Ab-initio development of state-of-the-art gas turbine technologies.
2. Technical/technological complexities.
3. Lack of availability of critical equipment & materials and denial of technologies by the technologically advanced countries.
4. Lack of availability of test facilities in the country necessitating testing abroad.
5. Non availability of skilled/technically specialized manpower."

As of 2011, the DRDO hoped to have the Kaveri engine ready for use on the Tejas in the latter half of the 2010s decade and the time to complete its research has been extended to 2011–2012. "In recent times, the engine has been able to produce thrust of 16,000–17,000 lb_{f} (70–75 kN) but what the IAF and other stake-holders desire is power between 20,000–21,000 lb_{f} (90–95 kN)", according to a The Hindu report in 2011. "On using the Kaveri for the LCA, they said the engine would be fitted on the first 40 LCAs (Tejas) to be supplied to the IAF when they come for upgrades to the DRDO in the latter half of the decade." The report further adds that in 2011, 50-60 test flights will be carried out to mature the engine in terms of reliability, safety and airworthiness. However the Kaveri could not be integrated on the first 40 production variant aircraft of Tejas.

In March 2012, Defence Minister A K Antony told the parliament that Kaveri was being developed with foreign assistance and would need another ₹2,839 crore (equivalent to ₹58 billion or US$610 million in 2026). In May 2012, A K Antony told in a written reply to Lok Sabha that DRDO has not prepared any timeline for the Kaveri engine but plans to start flight trials as technology demonstration on Tejas Mk 1 aircraft within 3 years. It was also announced that Kaveri has not been able to meet operational requirements and in planned to be used on UAVs and marine applications. Since 2009-10 till 2011–12, government's budgetary estimate for the DRDO was Rs 28,543.43. About ₹28,485.40 crore (equivalent to ₹590 billion or US$6.1 billion in 2026) was spent for the programme from 2009 to 2012. Another report in December 2012 suggested that GTRE aims to integrate the Kaveri power-plant with HAL Tejas fighter within the next 9-months. A test aircraft operated by Aeronautical Development Agency (ADA) will be used for the integration as per an industry source familiar with the programme. If the integration was successful, GTRE hopes to see a Tejas fly with a Kaveri power-plant by the end of 2013.

In Lok Sabha on 10 December 2012, A K Antony gave another update on the progress made by the Kaveri Engine Development Project:

1. So far, 9 prototypes of Kaveri Engine and 4 prototypes of Kabani (Core) Engine have been developed.
2. 2,200 hours of test (ground and altitude conditions) has been conducted.
3. The following two major milestones have been achieved:
  1. Successful completion of Official Altitude Testing (OAT); and
  2. Demonstration of First Block of flight of Kaveri Engine in Flying Test Bed (FTB).

Kaveri Engine was integrated with Il-76 Aircraft at Gromov Flight Research Institute (GFRI), Russia and flight test was successfully carried out up to 12 km (39,000 ft) maximum altitude and maximum forward speed of 0.7 Mach. Twenty Seven flights for 57 hours duration have been completed. DRDO demonstrated its technological capability in aero-engine technology. This has been a great achievement in the aerospace community of the country, when the first ever indigenously developed fighter aircraft engine was subjected to flight testing. Tacit knowledge acquired by the DRDO scientists during this project will also be applied for further aerospace technology. Kaveri spin-off engine can be used as propulsion system for Indian Unmanned Strike Air Vehicle (USAV).

In January 2013, the GTRE director said that they are abandoning the plan for co-development with Snecma, but they still need an overseas partner, which will be selected through competitive bidding.

In November 2014, The Defence Research and Development Organization (DRDO) decided to abandon the Kaveri engine (GTX-35VS ) programme due to its shortcomings.

On 4 July 2016, according to Indian media report, France offered to invest €1 billion to revive India's combat jet engine project, proposing a joint development plan that could see the stalled Kaveri gas turbine powering indigenous Tejas fighters by 2020.

On 20 November 2016, DRDO Director General for Aeronautics Cluster C. P. Ramanarayanan confirmed that DRDO and French Snecma have tied up to revive Kaveri Engine as part of the offsets deal for 36 Rafale jet. It is expected that the engine would be integrated and tested in LCA Tejas by 2018. According to a La Tribune article from February 26, 2018, Snecma will provide M88's technology to aid in the Kaveri's production. An auditing team from Safran certified the Kaveri engine in 2018, stating that it had attained a level of maturity appropriate for restricted aircraft integration. However the collaboration between both collapsed, as GTRE accused SNECMA of only providing minimal transfer of technologies for non-critical parts.

DRDO has achieved some crucial breakthrough in 2021 such as Near Isothermal Forging Technology that can produce all the five stages of high-pressure compressors (HPC) discs and single-crystal casting technology for turbine blades that will help in the aero engine development. The technology was a product of Defence Metallurgical Research Laboratory (DMRL). The technology was transferred to Mishra Dhatu Nigam for mass production.

=== Current status ===
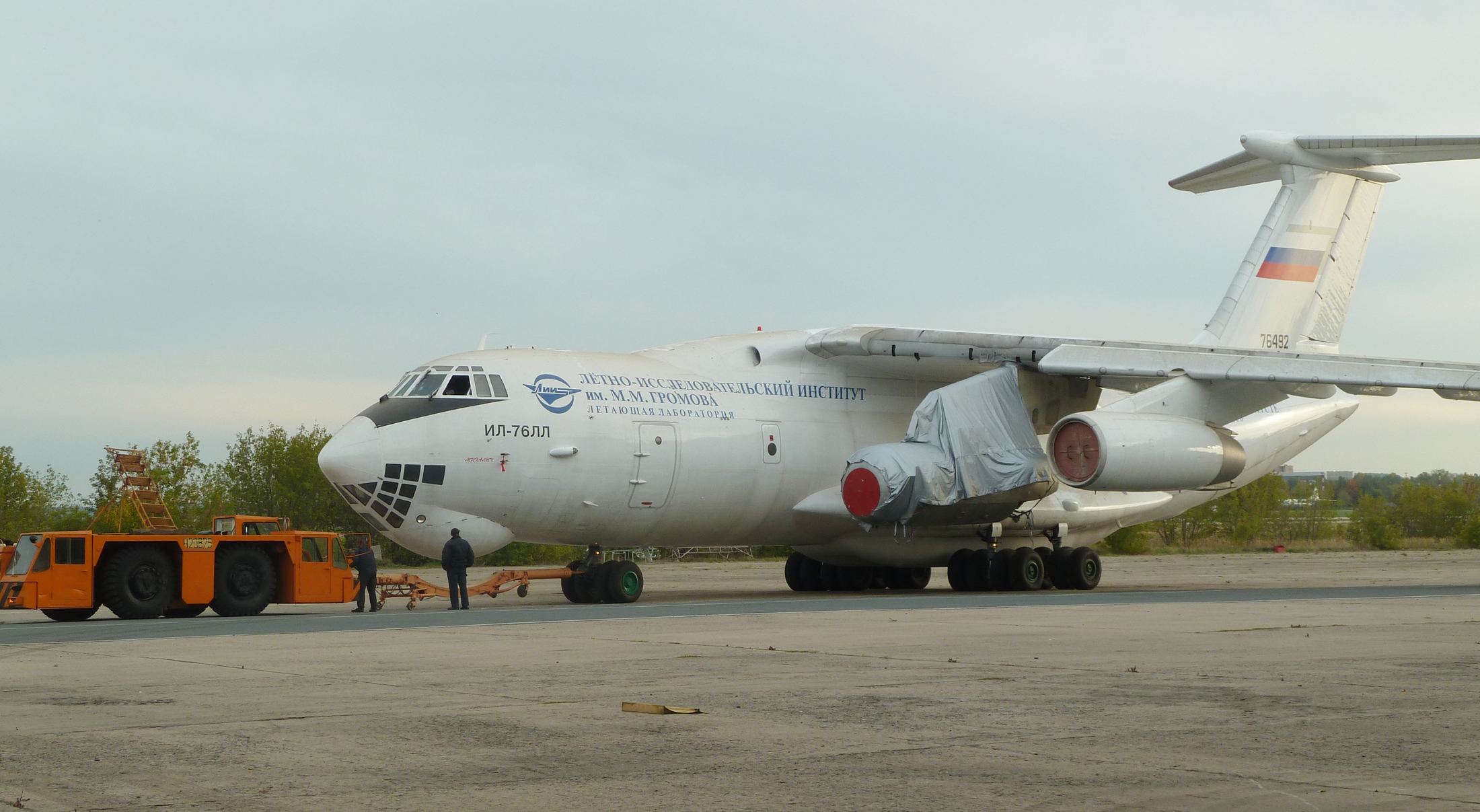
Kaveri engine undergoing flight test on a Russian IL-76 testbed

As per government statement in Rajya Sabha during Winter Session 2021, HAL Tejas FOC variant demands higher thrust which present Kaveri engine architecture is unable to provide hence will not be used. The engine did achieve higher Technology Readiness Level (TRL) in critical technology domains. There is a proposal to jointly develop a new engine for HAL AMCA with the help of foreign partners using the know how from the Kaveri engine programme.

As of 29 November 2021, a press release revealed that, 9 full prototype engines (K1 to K9) and 4 cores (Kabini) were built. The prototypes had completed 3,217 tests including Altitude tests & Flying Test Bed (FTB) trials.

Fund allocated and expenditure as of 2021
Funds allocated	Expenditure	Commitment
₹2,105 crore (equivalent to ₹26 billion or US$267.7 million in 2026)	₹2,035.56 crore (equivalent to ₹25 billion or US$258.8 million in 2026)	₹2,097.65 crore (equivalent to ₹26 billion or US$266.7 million in 2026)

In February 2022, DMRL has developed Nickel base superalloy DMR SN 742, which is a medium alloyed material that is used as high pressure compressor (HPC) and turbine (HPT) rotors in a variety of aero engines.

In October 2022, another round of high altitude tests were conducted at Gromov Flight Research Institute in Russia. Before that, Kaveri had produced a dry thrust of 46 kN and wet thrust of 70.5 kN as against the requirement of 81 kN as per the project and 85+ kN of requirement for powering LCA Tejas. Before the high-altitude testing, at the GTRE test facility in Bangalore, the Dry module of the engine underwent 70 hours of ground testing, and at the Baranov Central Institute of Aviation Motor Development in Russia, they underwent 75 hours of altitude testing, simulating an altitude of 13,000 m (43,000 ft). During the high altitude tests on board Ilyushin Il-76 testbed, the engine however achieved 48.5 kN of thrust. The tests officially concluded in February 2023 and Initial Flight Release (IFR) certification was expected by 2024. This achievement led to the fact that DRDO Ghatak stealth UCAV could be powered by Kaveri-Dry.

Prior to the high altitude test in 2022, the first prototype of dry Kaveri engine's performance was evaluated. The first phase included performance and operability at the high altitude test facility. A performance test was carried out on the second prototype, which included a new fan module, a short jet pipe, and an engine fuel control system. GTRE is aiming to integrate Kaveri on DRDO Ghatak by 2026.

On 18 June 2024, a report analysed the advancements done in Kaveri engine till then since the 2011 CAG report. The report noted that the weight of engine has been reduced to 1,180 kg (2,600 lb) and there has been advancements in turbines, compressors, gearboxes, ECS technologies, and metallurgy. Also, 3 engines have been upgraded to K9+ standard. However, much more developments and funding are required to replace F404 engines onboard HAL Tejas.

In September 2024, there was news that Bharat Heavy Electricals Limited and GTRE are going to collaborate for development of Marine Gas Turbine (MGT) and heavy duty industrial gas turbines.

On 24 November 2024, it was reported that BrahMos Aerospace was developing a 29 kN afterburner section for the Dry Kaveri engine, to target 80 kN total thrust On 23 December 2024, GTRE announced that the Kaveri engine's dry variant for DRDO Ghatak has been approved for in-flight tests on board an Ilyushin Il-76 testbed aircraft for performance evaluation under varied flight conditions. The approval was granted after extensive ground testing, modifications, and enhancements. Its overall dependability in changing conditions and interaction with aircraft systems will be evaluated. The maximum thrust of the variant is 49–51 kN (11,000–11,000 lb_{f}) while that of the planned Kaveri 2.0 variant with afterburner is expected to be 75–79 kN (17,000–18,000 lb_{f}).

On 28 May 2025, official confirmed there were only 25 hours of testing left to be completed on the Russian Il-76 testbed.

On 18 February 2026, the Defence Minister, Rajnath Singh, witnessed a successful full afterburner test for the Kaveri engine programme. This was the latest test used a newly designed afterburner system. This new part was made with help from BrahMos Aerospace, a company famous for building supersonic cruise missiles. The improved system is made to push the engine to around 81 to 83 kilonewtons

A report in August 2026 indicated that a Kaveri 2.0 programme was initiated by GTRE and the previous programme was delinked from a heavier stealth aircraft programme. The Kaveri 2.0 will target a 55–60 kN (12,000–13,000 lb_{f}) dry thrust and a 90–100 kN (20,000–22,000 lb_{f}) thrust class when coupled with afterburner. This will equip the HAL Tejas Mk1A, replacing the General Electric F404 engine during their Mid-life refits. The new programme will involve a newly designed engine core rather than a further incremental modification. This includes a redesigned high-pressure compressor (HPC) to maximise pressure ratios and fuel efficiency; single-piece blisks machined from advanced titanium alloys for the new core to eliminate air leaks, drop structural weight and raise the thrust-to-weight ratio; integration of single-crystal turbine blades into the assembly for higher internal operating temperatures and thermal efficiency.

=== Kaveri Derivative Engine ===
The Kaveri Derivative Engine (KDE) is the dry variant of GTX-35VS Kaveri which is intended for applications on Indian Unmanned Combat Aerial Vehicle (IUCAV), like DRDO Ghatak. The engine is also known as the Kaveri Dry Engine. The engines will have a thrust of 50 kN and excludes the afterburner.

The engine's altitude testing was conducted at Central Institute of Aviation Motors from October to December 2022. After being returned to GTRE in 2023, the engine underwent a thorough teardown. No significant damage was found on any of the parts during the disassembly examination. At the GTRE test bed, the second prototype engine has undergone 38 ASMET cycles. In order to demonstrate that the remedies are functioning under engine conditions, ground testing was conducted at GTRE on the engine and the issues that arose during the altitude testing were also fixed.

As of 27 May 2025, Kaveri engine was undergoing flight tests in Russia and 25 hours of testing was due. Between January 2023 and July 2025, two projects related to KDE — Flightworthy Kaveri Dry Engine Development and Technology Demonstration of Kaveri Derivative 'Dry' Engine — were cleared by the Ministry of Defence at a cost of ₹472.42 crore (equivalent to ₹488 crore or US$51 million in 2026) and ₹251.17 crore (equivalent to ₹259 crore or US$27 million in 2026), respectively. The First Engine to Test (FETT engine) was integrated in July 2025. Thereafter, performance & operability testing was completed in the uninstalled condition by September 2026. The engine rebuild is currently in progress for undertaking performance & operability demonstration in the installed condition and staircase test.

=== Criticism ===
The Kaveri program has attracted much criticism due to its ambitious objective which was seen competitive against western tech, protracted development time, cost overruns unsupported by the govt, and the DRDO's upgrading over clarity and openness in analysing problems was a good development but its mis-credited in comparison to retail business. There has been much lack of public understanding of the degree of realism in the DRDO's planning schedules for various elements of the LCA programme, most particularly for the Kaveri development effort. France's Snecma, with over half a century of successful jet engine development experience, took nearly 13 years to bring the Rafale fighter's M88 engine to low-volume production after bench testing had begun, which had spent enormous research funds, iterative development programs with cost overruns (but cost overruns were seen as integral part of R&D) and resources to fulfil their ambitious programme. Another criticism has been DRDO's reluctance to admit problems in the engine and its resistance to involve foreign engine manufacturers until the problems became too large to handle.

According to former GTRE director C.P. Ramanarayanan, the funding authorities, and senior government officials lacked an understanding of the scope of advancements and difficulties encountered by high-tech R&D projects. One more obstacle was low funding. India has invested significantly less in aircraft engine technology than the US, Russia, Europe, and China, according to GTRE director S.V. Ramana Murthy. Since it was initially approved in 1983, the Kaveri project has cost Indian taxpayers about $239 million. On the other hand, the Eurojet EJ200 took $1.6 billion to build between 1985 and 1995. When Snecma M88 was first tested in 1989, it cost $1.6 billion. It cost $6.7 billion to develop the Pratt & Whitney F135. For the development of aircraft engines, China has spent $42 billion.

== Design ==
A low-bypass-ratio (BPR) afterburning turbofan engine featuring a six-stage core high-pressure (HP) compressor with variable inlet guide vanes (IGVs), a three-stage low-pressure (LP) compressor with transonic blading, an annular combustion chamber, and cooled single-stage HP and LP turbines. The development model is fitted with an advanced convergent-divergent ("con-di") variable nozzle, but the GTRE hopes to fit production Tejas aircraft with an axisymmetric, multi-axis thrust-vectoring nozzle to further enhance the LCA's agility. The core turbojet engine of the Kaveri is the Kabini.

The general arrangement of the Kaveri is very similar to other contemporary combat engines, such as the Eurojet EJ200, General Electric F414 and Snecma M88. It has a very low bypass ratio (0.16:1). Similar low amounts of bypass on earlier engines, required only for afterburner and nozzle cooling, introduced the term "'leaky turbojet".

The Kaveri engine has been specifically designed for the Indian operating environment, which ranges from hot desert to the highest mountain range in the world. The GTRE's design envisions achieving a fan pressure ratio of 4:1 and an overall pressure ratio of 27:1, which it believes will permit the Tejas to "supercruise" (cruise supersonically without the use of the afterburner).

A two-phase plan has been in place since 2019 for Kaveri derivatives. It consists of a high-bypass-ratio turbofan based on the Kabini core and a non-afterburning version intended for on an under development advanced jet trainer, the HAL HJT-36. The current Kaveri engine (as of 2024) is modified and tested at Phase 1, the technology demonstration stage, to ensure that it satisfies the design specification. Additionally, Phase 2 money was granted to GTRE in order to produce five new prototype engines for Kaveri derivatives. GTRE changed three Kaveri engines to the derivative model, two of them are undergoing demonstrator testing. As per Ex Director Y. Dilip, right now the development is on 73 kN engine with an afterburner, which is ready to go and the team is making an effort to fly it on HAL Tejas.

Another concept being considered is an enlarged version of the Tejas which is being called Tejas Mk 2 with two engines fitted with fully vectoring nozzles, which might make the vertical tail redundant (the Tejas has no horizontal tail).

An indigenous Full Authority Digital Engine Control (FADEC) unit, called Kaveri Digital Engine Control Unit (KADECU) has been developed by the Defence Avionics Research Establishment (DARE), Bangalore. The Combat Vehicles Research and Development Establishment (CVRDE) of Avadi was responsible for the design and development of the Tejas aircraft-mounted accessory gear box (AMAGB) and the power take-off (PTO) shaft.

== Manufacturing ==
In September 2022, Godrej Aerospace of Godrej & Boyce received a contract to supply 8 modules of Kaveri Derivative Engine, a variant excluding afterburner with a thrust of 48 kN. The contract was announced in February 2023. Over 25 companies competed for the deal. The deliveries are expected to start by late 2024 and end by August 2025. These will undergo testing and will be certified later. Godrej also invested ₹500 crore (equivalent to ₹546 crore or US$57 million in 2026) for a 100 acres (400,000 m^{2}) facility in Khalapur, 70 km from Mumbai. On 7 May 2024, Godrej Aerospace announced that it is creating a high-temperature brazing method that is essential to the performance of aero engines. By early 2024, the company plans to complete the first stage of development and be manufacturing eight modules comprising six 48 kN dry engines without an afterburner. The remaining modules will be provided over the course of 27 to 30 months.

In April 2025, it was reported that Godrej has delivered the first two models of Kaveri Derivative Engines (KDE) while 6 more are to be delivered.

== Applications ==
- GTX-35VS Kaveri:
  - AMCA MKII (Planned)
- Derivatives:
  - Kaveri Marine Gas Turbine (KMGT), a derivative of the GTX-35VS Kaveri engine for ships developed in 2008. Produces a power output of 12 MW.
  - Kaveri Derivative Engine (KDE), a non-afterburning variant of Kaveri to power DRDO Ghatak UCAV.

== Specification (GTX-35VS Kaveri) ==
==== General characteristics ====
- Type: Afterburning Turbofan
- Length: 349.0 cm (137.4 in)
- Diameter: 90.9 cm (35.8 in)
- Dry weight: 1,057 kg (2,330 lb)

==== Components ====
- Compressor: Two-spool, with low-pressure (LP) and high-pressure (HP) axial compressors:
  - LP compressor with 3 fan stages and transonic blading
  - HP compressor with 6 stages, including variable inlet guide vanes and first two stators
- Combustors: Annular, with dump diffuser and air-blast fuel atomisers
- Turbine: 1 LP stage and 1 HP stage

==== Performance ====
- Maximum thrust:
- Military: 52 kN (11,700 lb_{f})
- Afterburner: 81 kN (18,100 lb_{f})
- Specific fuel consumption:
- Military: 0.78 lb/(lbf•h) (79.52 kg/(kN·h))
- Afterburner: 2.03 lb/(lbf•h) (207.00 kg/(kN·h))
- Thrust-to-weight ratio: dry 5.02 and with afterburner 7.8

=== Engine cycle ===
- Airflow: 78 kg (172 lb) per second
- Bypass ratio: 0.16:1
- Overall pressure ratio: 21.5:1
- LP compressor pressure ratio: 3.4:1
- HP compressor pressure ratio: 6.4:1
- Turbine entry temperature: 2,600 °F (1,427 °C; 1,700 K)

== See also ==
Comparable engines

- Eurojet EJ200 (1991)
- General Electric F404 (1978)
- Guizhou WS-13 (2006)
- Klimov RD-33 (1974)
- Snecma M88 (1989)
- Turbo-Union RB199 (1971)

Related lists

- List of aircraft engines
