= Future of the Indian Air Force =

Indian military modernization program

The Indian Air Force has been undergoing a modernization program to replace and upgrade outdated equipment since the late 1990s to meet modern standards. For that reason, it has started procuring and developing aircraft, weapons, associated technologies, and infrastructures. Some of these programs date back to the late 1980s. The primary focus of current modernization and upgrades is to replace aircraft purchased from the Soviet Union that currently form the backbone of the air force.

Ensign of the Indian Air Force

The Indian Air Force plans to attain a 42 squadron strength by 2035 and deploy 450 fighter jets each along the borders of Pakistan and China. The IAF will also acquire large numbers of stealthy autonomous UCAVs (DRDO Ghatak), swarm drones (ALFA-S) and uncrewed aircraft to transform into a fully advanced network-centric force capable of sustained multi-role operations along the entire spectrum. As of September 2024, the Indian Air Force also plans to indigenize their entire fighter jet fleet by 2042.

However, the 42-squadron strength target timeline has been derailed. As of October 2025, 31 combat squadrons were active and an establishment of only 35-36 squadrons can be achieved by 2035, even if projects such as the Tejas Mk1A, Tejas Mk2 and MRFA succeed on time.

Additionally, as per the “Unmanned Force Plan” published in July 2025, the Indian Air Force plans to acquire 30–50 units of small, medium or large category Unmanned Aerial Vehicles (UAVs) within the next three to five years for "specific combat roles". The goal is to create a future-proof unmanned aircraft fleet. This was also announced by Air Commodore (Operations) Sandeep Singh.

== Renaming ==
In 2023, the IAF submitted a proposal to rename itself as the Indian Air and Space Force (IASF). The proposal is a part of the IAF's goals to become a credible space force. This proposal is part of the IAF's plan to expand its role in space-related activities, including precision navigation, timing (PNT), intelligence, surveillance, reconnaissance (ISR), space traffic management, space situational awareness, and space weather prediction. The IAF aims to collaborate with organizations including the Indian Space Research Organisation, (ISRO), IN-SPACe, and India's private space sector to further its space related objectives. India plans to have over 100 small and large military satellites under the aegis of Defence Space Agency which is expected to be established as full fledged Space Command within seven to eight years. The IAF started training personnel, in 2023, to operate in space by incorporating theoretical studies at institutions such as the College of Air Warfare. In 2024, Air Chief Marshal Vivek Ram Chaudhari, stated that the IAF has revised its existing doctrine and has recognized space as a critical domain for future operations.

=== Space equipment procurement, assets and development ===
The IAF is increasing procuring and developing space related equipment and assets.

- In 2023, the IAF was looking to procure the Reusable Launch Vehicle (RLV), a space plane being developed by ISRO.
- In March 2024, the Chief of Defence Staff General Anil Chauhan announced that the Indian Armed Forces had allocated Rs 25,000 crore for defence space requirements, including building a constellation of surveillance satellites in order to secure communications networks.
- In July 2024, the space startup Pixxel announced that it plans to supply miniaturised multi-payload satellites, for monitoring goals, to the IAF by 2025.

== Delays in procurements ==
On 17 December 2024, a parliamentary panel report stated that the Indian Air Force had a combat fleet strength of 31 squadrons against a minimum requirement of 42 squadrons. The decrease in squadron strength is due to the retirement of multiple ageing aircraft, including MiG-21s, MiG-23s and MiG-27s, in the 2000s and 2010s without replacement. However, "multi-pronged" approaches are being taken to "minimise the impact" as per the report. The depletion of squadron strength is planned to be addressed by the procurement of the HAL Tejas and HAL Tejas Mk2; and the MRFA programme.

By 23 December, the Ministry of Defence formed a high-level committee chaired by Defence Secretary Rajesh Kumar Singh. The committee was tasked with proposing a new Road Map to address the critical capability gap of the Air Force. There were a shortage of not only fighter jets but also force multipliers such as AEW&C, in-flight refuellers and ISR aircraft. The report of the panel was to be submitted by the end of January 2025 after surveying the IAF's "overall capability development through several indigenous design and development as well as direct acquisition projects". Members of the panel included DRDO chairman Samir V. Kamat, Secretary of Defence Production Sanjeev Kumar and Deputy Chief of the Air Staff Air Marshal Tejinder Singh among others. Stalled fighter aircraft acquisition includes 83 Tejas Mk1A on order and the MRFA programme. The Tejas programme was being delayed due to the supply delay of F-404 engines. The procurement of force multipliers will also be evaluated. India has only 6 Il-78MKI aircraft inducted in 2003-04 against a requirement of at least 18 such aircraft which are necessary to enhance operational range of combat aircraft. Also, IAF operates only 3 Netra and Phalcon AWACS (inducted in 2009-11) each. Programmes such as the Netra Mk1A and Mk2 needed to be fast-tracked as well.

Additional ageing aircraft to be retired, including:

- SEPECAT Jaguar and Dassault Mirage 2000 (late 2020s onwards)
- Mikoyan MiG-29 (from 2027-28 to early 2040s)
- Sukhoi Su-30MKI (early production variants; 2040s onwards). Upgraded Super-30 variants from 2055 onwards.

Another high-level committee was constituted also chaired by the Defence Secretary in early February 2025 with the objective to "streamline the production of indigenous light combat aircraft (LCA) and enhance the role of the private sector in making the fighter jets". Other members from all stakeholders including the Indian Air Force and Hindustan Aeronautics Limited are part of the committee. The committee has been repeatedly tasked to "scrutinising the current production capacity, constraints being faced and requirements of the Air Force" and submit its report within a month.

The Empowered Committee for Capability Enhancement of IAF submitted its report to the Ministry of Defence on 3 March 2025 after delays from the initial deadline of end of January. The committee suggested that the private sector should complement Defence Public Sector Undertakings (DPSU), DRDO and other government agencies in the defense and aerospace sector and also set some recommendations to be implemented in the "short, medium and long-term so as to achieve the desired capability enhancement goals of lAF in an optimal manner".

As of 17 March 2025, reports suggested that another top level committee was evaluating a "clear-cut strategy and production-cum-business model" to accelerate the development of Advanced Medium Combat Aircraft (AMCA). The committee is chaired by the Defence Secretary and its members include Secretary of Defence Production, Vice Chief of the Air Staff Air Marshal SP Dharkar and top officials from Aeronautical Development Agency (ADA) and Defence Research and Development Organisation (DRDO). The committee, tasked to devise a plan to "shrink timelines" to get AMCA from drawing board to air as well as the high thrust indigenous engine development, is expected to be its report submitted in April.

Following the ceremonial retirement of Mikoyan-Gurevich MiG-21 from active service, the Air Force would be left with only 29 squadrons, lower than the squadron strength of the Air Force during Indo-Pakistani war of 1965 when the IAF had 32 squadrons.

=== Training gaps ===
During the Parliament Winter Session in 2024, the Comptroller and Auditor General published a report to highlight the increased deficiencies in pilot training in the IAF. As per the report, the IAF had a deficit of 486 combat pilots in February 2015 and had plans to induct 222 pilots per year until 2021. However, initial annual intake ranged between 158 and 204 trainees and that after wastage ranged between 124 to 167, increasing the deficit to 596 by 2021. The pilot to seat ratio is 1.25:1 which, though enough for peacetime service, is too low for intense ops. Also, it was reported that the aircraft use for training pilots for all three streams (combat, helicopter and transport) was done on older aircraft. In case of fixed wing training, the planned procurement of 296 trainer aircraft by 2016 including 106 Basic Trainer Aircraft and 73 Intermediate Trainer Jets have stalled. The procurement, if successful, would have given enough training resources to the IAF until 2036. In case of rotary stream, pilots are being trained on HAL Chetak which was inducted half a decade ago.

== Upgrade programmes ==
=== Super Sukhoi ===
In 2024, the Super Sukhoi project — a programme to upgrade IAF's Su-30MKI, considered the backbone of its fleet — was first announced. The upgrade included the introduction of AESA radars, long-range weapons and electronic warfare suite (EWS) to the fleet in order to extend its service life by 30 years. Additionally, the Su-30MKI will have Suppression of Enemy Air Defenses (SEAD) capabilities along with offensives against ground targets in contested airspace. The upgrade is to be carried out by Hindustan Aeronautics Limited (HAL) with the support of Defence Research and Development Organisation (DRDO) and several private companies. Overall, 51 systems are to be upgraded including 30 by HAL, 13 by DRDO and 8 by private sector companies. The Indian indigenous content is planned to be increased to 78%. The upgrade is to allow the fighter to remain in service beyond 2055.

The Defence Acquisition Council (DAC) had granted Acceptance of Necessity (AoN) for the ₹66,829 crore (equivalent to ₹690 billion or US$7.4 billion in 2026) upgrade programme on 30 November 2023.

Though the project, which is expected to include minor contributions from Russia, was soon expected to receive the CCS clearance on 27 November 2025, the approval was yet to be accorded on 25 February 2026. It was reported that the Indian Air Force is now considering a parallel upgrade programme from Russia for a similar or larger quantity of aircraft. This upgrade, in line with the earlier MiG-21Bison upgrade, will "offset the long execution timeline" of the Super Sukhoi project since the project's final operational clearance (FOC) timeline might not be realised as expected. The parallel project will focus on the electronic warfare suite, radar and the Russian-offered AL-41 engine. If the project is taken up after inter-government talks, the proposal would be sent to the Defence Acquisition Council (DAC) for Acceptance of Necessity (AoN). The AoN marks the first formal stage of a programme. Meanwhile, DRDO is undertaking design work for the Super Sukhoi project from its internal budget. However, a substantial financial support is required for full-scale development and integration which could be realised only after CCS clearance and budget allocation.

The major components of the Super Sukhoi project include:

AESA radar
The current radar is to be replaced with a modern AESA radar named DRDO Virupaakhsha (enhanced variant of Uttam AESA Radar) which will increase the detection range by 1.5 to 1.7 times making the jets capable to operate long range weapons like Astra Mk3.

Electronic warfare suite
In May 2024, DRDO's CASDIC released an Expression of Interest (EoI) to collaborate with a Development-cum-Production Partner (DccP) to develop an indigenous Electronic Warfare suite. The allocated timeframe for Design and Development (D&D) 32 months. This programme includes integration, testing and trials of the system that is developed. On 3 December 2024, the Defence Acquisition Council (DAC) cleared the procurement of Electronic Warfare Suite (EWS) compromising of External Airborne Self Protection Jammer pods, Dhruti Next Generation Radar Warning Receiver, Dual Color Missile Approach Warning System and associated equipment.

On 15 November 2025, the Ministry of Defence released a Request for Information (RFI) to procure 100 sets of Aircraft Self Protection Jammers (ASPJ) complemented by associated equipment for the Su-30MKI aircraft. The last date for a vendor to respond to the RFI is 22 December. The deliveries are to be completed within a timeline of 36 months. The pods must be capable of jamming and spoofing enemy airborne and ground radars.

In May 2026, an RFP was released to upgrade 258 Su-30MKI aircraft with anti-jamming navigation system. The system should be capable of operating at altitudes of up to 69,000 ft (21 km), speeds of up to 1,840 km/h; 1,140 mph (Mach 1.5) and accelerations ranging between -2g and +9g. The bids are to be submitted by 22 June with deliveries to be delivered within 24 months of contract signing. The project included deliveries of 300 antenna systems along with 50 field-level testers and 10 base-level testers.

Long-range weapons
The jets will also be modified to fire BrahMos-ER missiles. Other missiles which are to be integrated on these jets include Rudram-II, Astra series and R-37M missiles. As per reports on 1 March 2026, the air-launched variant of the LR-LACM was expected to enter operational testing shortly. The missile has been developed by the Aeronautical Development Establishment (ADE) and is being prepared for integration with the Sukhoi Su-30MKI.

New engines and others
In August 2024, a report suggested that the Ministry of Defence (MoD) has prepared to sign a deal with HAL to purchase 230 AL-31FP engines under a ₹21,000 crore (equivalent to ₹220 billion or US$2.4 billion in 2026) deal to replace older engines. A total of 950 engines are required. On 2 September, Cabinet Committee on Security (CCS) approved the purchase of 240 such engines for ₹26,000 crore (equivalent to ₹280 billion or US$3.0 billion in 2026). The delivery of the engines will continue from 1 year of signing the contract to 8th year of signing the contract. The engines will be manufactured in HAL's Engine Division Koraput and will have an indigenous content of 54%. The contract was signed officially on 9 September 2024. The first engine was delivered on 1 October 2024 while all the engines will be delivered within 8 years at a production rate of 30 units per year. In October 2026, HAL announced its investment of ₹335 crore (US$36 million) to enhance the annual production rate to 50 units. It had already delivered 63 engines in two years against the target of 60 units.

== Procurement programmes ==
Aircraft	Origin	Type	Variant	Units	Status	Note
Combat aircraft
HAL Tejas	India	Multirole	Mk1A	141	On order	
Su-30MKI	India Russia	Multirole		12	On order	Deliveries between FY2027–28 and 2029.
Dassault Rafale	IndiaFrance	Multirole		114	Planned	The procurement kicked off when the Acquisition Wing of the MoD issued the Letter of Request (LoR) in the last week of May 2026. This will be followed by a response from France.
AWACS
Netra Mk 1A (EMB145)	India Brazil	AEW&C	Mk1A	6	Under development	Based on EMB 145 airframe.
Netra Mk 2 (Airbus A321)	India European Union	AEW&C	Mk2	6	Under development	Based on Airbus A321 airframe.
Helicopters
HAL Prachand	India	Attack		66	Ordered	
HAL Light Utility Helicopter	India	Utility		6	Ordered	6 units are being built under Limited Series Production (LSP).
Trainer aircraft
HAL Tejas	India	Conversion Trainer	Mk1	18	In production	6 delivered
HAL Tejas	India	Conversion Trainer	Mk1A	29	Ordered	
HAL HTT-40	India	Trainer		70	Ordered	70 ordered worth ₹6,800 crore (US$900 million);Option for 35 more
Transport aircraft
Airbus C-295	Spain India	Transport	C-295MW	40	In production	16 delivered of total 56. First 16 C295s assembled by Airbus in Seville, Spain, while the remaining 40 is being built in partnership with TASL in Vadodara, India
Medium Transport Aircraft (MTA)		Transport		60	Planned	In 2026, the Ministry of Defense issued the tender for the procurement of Medium Transport Aircraft for IAF. Contenders: Embraer C-390 Millenium, Airbus A400M Atlas and Lockheed Martin C-130J Super Hercules.
Reconnaissance
ISTAR aircraft	India	ISTAR		3	Planned	
Flight Refueling Aircraft
Boeing 767	United States Israel	Aerial Refueler	KC-767 MRTT	6	Planned	Converted from commercial aircraft.
		Aerial Refueler		6	Planned	Purpose-built mid-air refuellers.
Unmanned combat aerial vehicle
Remotely Piloted Strike Aircraft (RPSA)		UCAV		60	Planned	Four squadrons with 20 aircraft each. DRDO Ghatak is expected to fulfil the requirement.

=== Fighter aircraft ===
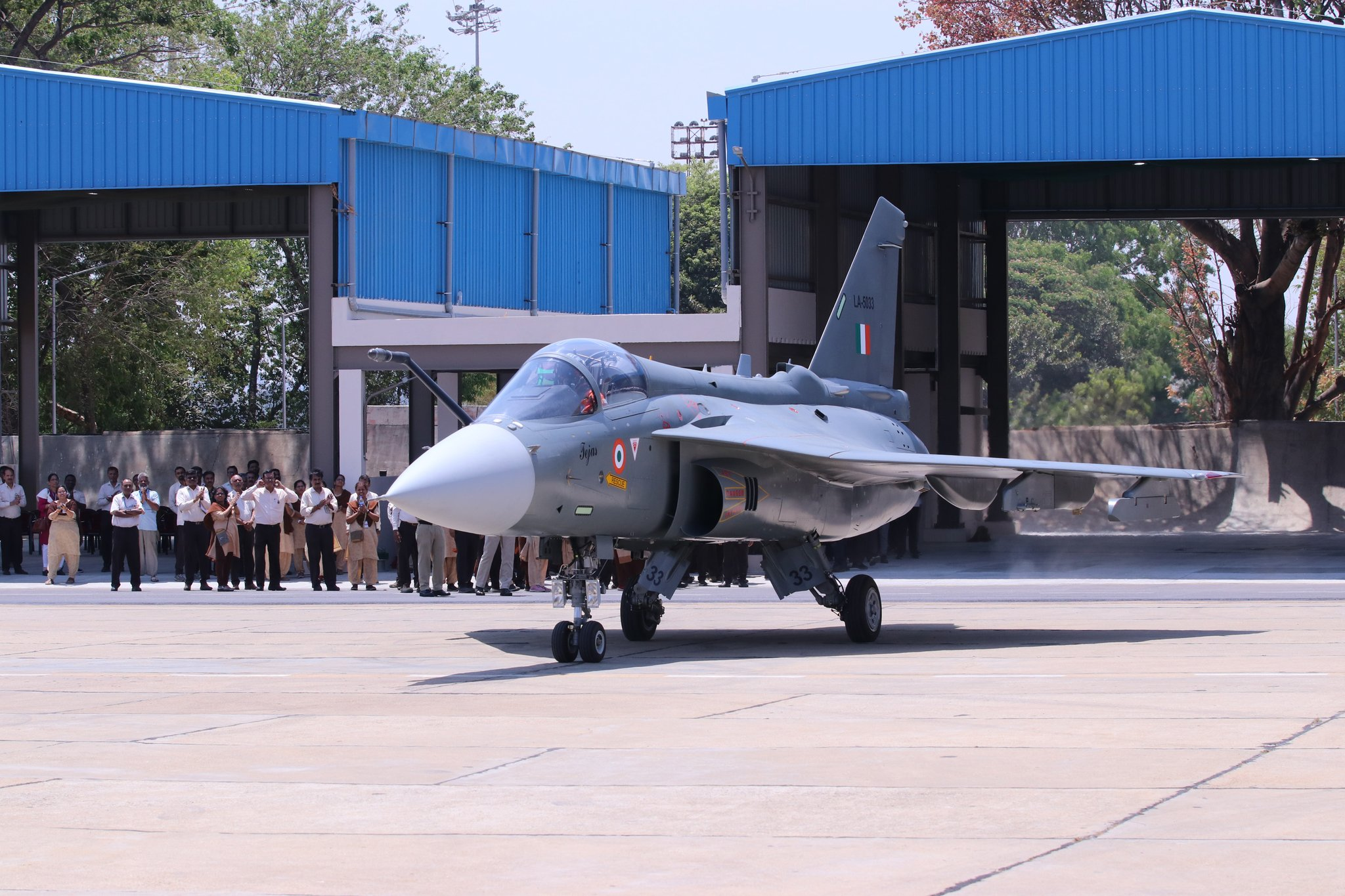
HAL Tejas Mk 1A

==== HAL Tejas Mark 1A ====
On 3 February 2021, the Ministry of Defence signed a contract with HAL for the procurement of 83 advanced HAL Tejas aircraft, which includes 73 Mark 1A and 10 Mark 1 trainer variants with advanced AESA Radars, jammers, superior avionics, next-gen BVR missiles, better payload, and enhanced combat range.

On 30 November 2023, DAC accorded AoNs for the procurement of additional 97 Tejas Mk 1A for the IAF from HAL under Buy (Indian-IDDM) category. The contract for 29 twin-seater and 68 fighter variants was signed on 25 September 2025.

==== Dassault Rafale ====
The government-to-government (G2G) deal for 114 Rafale aircraft under the Multi-Role Fighter Aircraft (MRFA) programme was first reported in April 2025. By August, IAF was actively pursuing for the deal to meet its urgent requirements amid its depleting fighter strength and was expected to submit a document to the Ministry of Defence for the procurement programme soon for an approval. Rafale's existing infrastructure at air bases where the jet is deployed — Hasimara and Ambala — can host at least one more squadron of the jet each. The proposal document, officially the Statement of Case (SoC), was received by the Ministry of Defence in early September and was being considered by the Finance Division, chaired by Secretary (Defence Finance). By 17 September, the deal had been moved to fast track procurement mode and was expected to be signed in the next year.

On 16 January 2026, the Defence Procurement Board chaired by the Defence Secretary, Rajesh Kumar Singh, cleared the acquisition proposal worth ₹3.25 lakh crore (€31 billion). The deal includes 88 single-seat variants and 26 twin-seat trainer variants. The in-service 36 IAF Rafales might also be upgraded to the F4 standard under the agreement.

The deal was granted the Acceptance of Necessity (AoN) during a Defence Acquisition Council (DAC) meeting chaired by the Defence Minister, Rajnath Singh, on 12 February 2026. According to the proposal document cleared by DAC, 18 fighters are to be delivered in fly away condition from France; the remaining 96 are to be manufactured in India with an indigenous content of over 25%. The fly away jets are not expected to arrive before 2032 as per an India Today article on 18 February while the Indian assembled jets are also expected to arrive by the same time. Though Dassault will reportedly integrate Astra Mark 1 and the Smart Anti-Airfield Weapon on Rafale, the IAF will still need to depend on the firm to integrate further weapons since the source code is not acquired. In March 2026, Dassault CEO Éric Trappier explained that the firm will establish a second Rafale assembly line at Hyderabad, if the order is placed, with a target production rate yet to be decided. On the other hand, the indigenisation of these fighters is expected to be 50% by component numbers.

In April 2026, it was reported that the request for proposal (RfP) will be issued to Dassault aviation by May. This will be followed by contract negotiations during which the government will ensure that indigenous weapons remain compatible with the aircraft. The transfer of the interface control document (ICD) will be insisted on by the Indian site during the negotiations. The plan is to “hardwire” ICD into the final contract.

The Acquisition Wing of the Indian MoD issued the Letter of Request (LoR) in the last week of May. This marked the formal commencement of the acquisition project. The LoR is a formal government-to-government communication used to initiate defence procurement under the Intergovernmental Agreement (IGA) framework. The response to the LoR, the detailed technical and commercial proposal, was submitted by France on 29 July. The proposal is being examined by the Acquisition Wing and the Indian Air Force. The proposal also includes a detailed partnership roadmap for the project — Dassault has proposed a joint final assembly line with Tata Advanced Systems; a partnership between Thales and Mahindra Group to collaborate on radar and avionics; MBDA is likely to partner with Larsen & Toubro for armaments; and Safran will partner with Hindustan Aeronautics Limited for the aero engine segment. The major requirement were met by the proposal which is still under detailed evaluation. If there is no major clarification required, the procedure will directly skip to cost and contract negotiations. Since the France's proposed pricing falls within the DAC cleared budget of ₹3.25 lakh crore, officials aims to conclude the contract within this financial year.

=== Transports ===
==== Airbus C295 ====
On 8 September 2021, the Cabinet Committee on Security cleared the procurement of 56 C-295Ws for the IAF. Of these, 16 aircraft would be delivered in flyaway condition from Spain within 48 months of the contract's signing (by August 2025), while 40 more aircraft are to be manufactured in India by Tata Advanced Systems Limited within the following ten years at a "Final Assembly Line" (FAL) in Vadodara, Gujarat. All aircraft from the Tata Aircraft Complex are scheduled to be delivered between September 2026 and August 2031. Also, as per the contract, a D-level Maintenance, Repair and Overhaul (MRO) facility will be set up in India before the completion of deliveries.

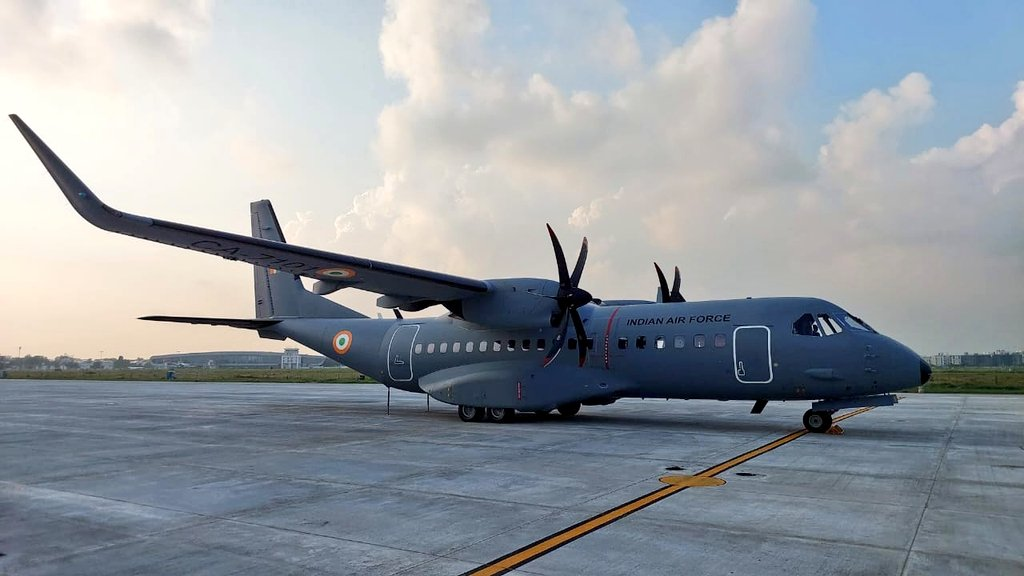
Indian Air Force's first C-295 at its home base in Vadodara

On 24 September 2021, the Ministry of Defence signed a contract worth ₹21,935 crore (equivalent to ₹360 billion or US$3.9 billion in 2026) with Airbus Defence & Space to supply 56 C-295s. The fleet will boost the IAF's tactical airlift capability with the rear ramp for quick reaction and para dropping of troops & cargo and operations from semi-prepared strips, especially in the Northern and North-Eastern sector and the Andaman & Nicobar Islands. The first C-295 was delivered to the IAF on 13 September 2023. Between mid-2024 and August 2025, Spanish-built aircraft were delivered at a rate of roughly one per month until August 2025, followed by deliveries from the domestic plant in Vadodara.

On 30 October 2022, the Indian Prime Minister, Narendra Modi laid the foundation for the Vadodara final assembly line. Ten other nations have the capability to manufacture military transport aircraft. On 28 October 2024, the facility was inaugurated by Indian Prime Minister, Narendra Modi, and Spanish Prime Minister, Pedro Sanchez. The facility will initially deliver eight aircraft per year and the deliveries will complete by 2031.

As part of the agreement, 96% of the assembly job required in Spain's facility will be shifted to the Vadodara facility. Further, 13,400 parts, 4,600 sub assemblies and all significant component assemblies will be manufactured by Indian MSMEs across seven states by the end of production. The localisation of the components will be done at a rate of 4,000 per year. There will be a technology transfer of up to 90% while the whole aircraft will be built in India from the 30th unit onwards in terms of man hours. Only some non-Airbus components like landing gear, engine, and avionics are not being localised. The local content for the initial 16 aircraft from Tata will be 48% and will rise to 75% for the last 24 C-295s. All aircraft feature an Indian electronic warfare suite manufactured by Bharat Dynamics Limited and Bharat Electronics Limited. A full-mission simulator has been established at Agra AFS for training personnel.

In January 2026, the first aircraft from the Indian assembly line was expected to roll out before the September timeline. On 4 February, Wouter van Wersch, Airbus executive vice-president international, also confirmed at the Singapore Airshow that the aircraft's delivery in the second half of the year. The Indian Prime Minister will reportedly officiate the roll out of the aircraft. As per 12 may reports, the first Tata-built C-295 entered the final stages of manufacturing before rollout, which can be conducted ahead of schedule. The Deputy Chief of the Air Staff, Air Marshal A. K. Bharti, visited the facility as the first aircraft was being prepared for maiden flight. The maiden flight was conducted on 10 June.

==== Medium Transport Aircraft (MTA) ====
The IAF is looking for a new transport aircraft with a cargo carrying capacity of (18–27 tonnes). The MTA programme is to replace the ageing in-service Antonov An-32 and Ilyushin Il-76 of the IAF with a fleet of medium-class transport aircraft. The Request for Information (RFI) was issued by the IAF in December 2022. IAF has asked for to provide “Rough Order of Magnitude (ROM) cost of aircraft and associated equipment” for a batch of 40, 60 and 80 aircraft. The IAF needs the aircraft to be operable from unprepared runways including India’s Advanced Landing Grounds (ALGs) in Ladakh and Northeast India.

The participants in the programme include:

1. Embraer KC-390 Millennium — The aircraft has been promoted as a next-generation, multi mission transport and aerial refuelling capabilities. As for the local manufacturing of the aircraft, Embraer Defense & Security and Mahindra Group formed a strategic alliance to bid for the MTA programme on 17 October 2025. On 20 February 2026, the firms announced their plans to advance location selection for the potential production and MRO base in India subject to IAF's selection of KC-390 in the programme.
2. Lockheed Martin C-130J Super Hercules — Lockheed Martin has announced its partnership with Tata Advanced Systems Limited (TASL) for C-130J production on 10 September 2024. Lockheed Martin and Rolls-Royce is also establishing the MRO facilities to service the Air Force's in-service 12 C-130Js and their AE 2100 engines, respectively. A production facility will be established in India if selected under the programme.
3. Airbus A400M Atlas — Airbus also has a tie-up with TASL through which the C-295 transport aircraft is currently being manufactured for the Indian Air Force. However, its partnership for the MTA programme is yet to be announced.

As reported on 7 November 2025, the Ministry of Defence (MoD) is soon expected to initiate the MTA procurement programme. This includes granting of the Acceptance of Necessity (AoN) by the Defence Acquisition Council (DAC), chaired by the Minister of Defence, Rajnath Singh, by the end of December and issuing the tender for the competition in early 2026. As of February 2026, it is reported that a revised RFI in 2025 has increased the upper limit of MTA to 30 tonnes. The procurement proposal is expected to be taken up by the DAC in the coming months.

On 3 March 2026, the Defence Procurement Board chaired by the Defence Secretary, Rajesh Kumar Singh, cleared the acquisition proposal. The project includes the delivery of 12 aircraft (20%) in flyaway state from the manufacturer and the rest of 48 (80%) being produced in India. The project to induct 60 medium transport aircraft will be pursued under the "Buy and Make" category at an approximate cost of ₹1 lakh crore (US$11 billion). The primary requirement is replacement of the Antonov An-32 fleet of the IAF and also supporting and taking up some roles of the Ilyushin Il-76 fleet. The programme will bridge the gap between the light and heavy transporters in the force. On 26 March 2026, the Defence Acquisition Council (DAC), chaired by the Minister of Defence, cleared the acquisition programme. The tender was issued on 12 August to Indian companies including Mahindra Defence, Tata Advanced Systems and Hindustan Aeronautics are reportedly part of the programme. The aircraft produced in India would have an indigenous content of over 60%. The aircraft could also be deployed by the IAF for mid-air refuelling.

=== Force multipliers ===
==== AEW&CS ====
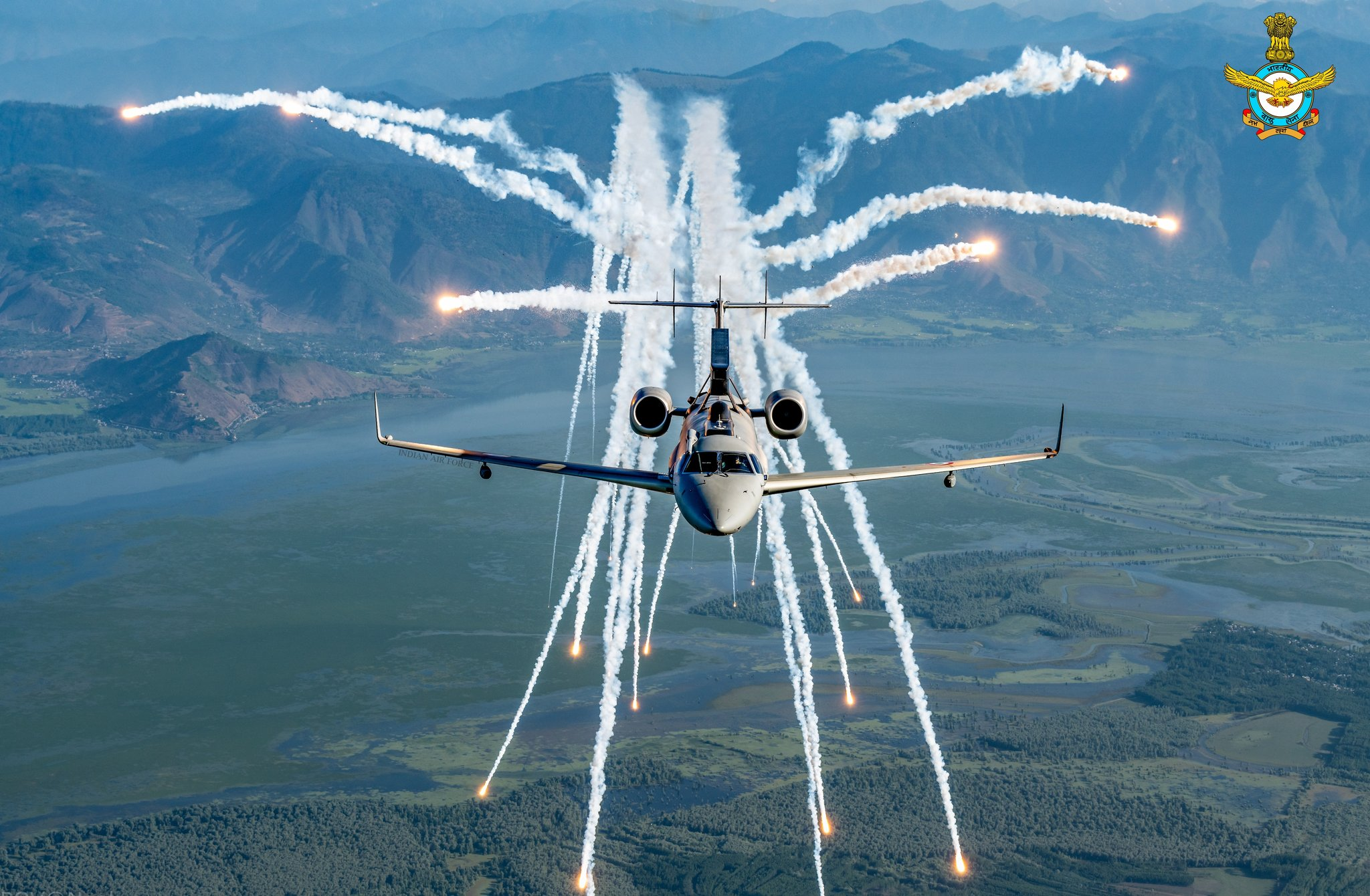
Netra Mk 1

The IAF plans to operate 18 airborne early warning and control systems, out of which 15 will be the DRDO AEW&CS and 3 will be the EL/W-2090.

- Netra Mk 1A – Six additional Netra Mk 1A based on the same platform as that of Mark 1 variant are being planned to be acquired by the IAF as part of a $1 billion plan to add force multipliers in the air force.
- Netra Mk 2 – The Cabinet Committee on Security (CCS), on 19 July 2025, cleared the ₹20,000 crore (equivalent to ₹210 billion or US$2.2 billion in 2026) project for six AEW&CS platforms. Airbus A321 platforms were purchased from Air India with modification work in advanced stages.

==== Flight Refuelling Aircraft (FRA) ====
The Indian Air Force is currently in need of 18 Tanker aircraft.

On 25 January 2018, the Indian Air Force launched a Request for Information (RFI) after two earlier tenders were cancelled within a duration seven years. The responses were to be submitted within 30 March. While the No. 78 Squadron is based at Agra Air Force Station in the West, the new fleet will be stationed at Panagarh Air Force Station in the East. The RFI was sent to Boeing, Airbus and Ilyushin. However, as the document specified the requirement of two-engine aircraft with two-man cabin crew, Il-78MKI was disqualified. Both Boeing and Airbus responded to the request with KC-46 Pegasus and A330 MRTT, respectively. Reportedly, the tender following the RFI was expected to have 30 percent mandatory direct defense offset clause.

On 6 April 2022, Hindustan Aeronautics Limited (HAL) signed an agreement with Israel Aerospace Industries (IAI) to convert six Boeing 767 commercial airliners into Multi Mission Tanker Transport (MMTT) in India. However, Boeing has to grant permission for such a conversion.

As of August 2023, a Request for Proposal (RfP) was expected from the IAF within the next six months. The IAF may also procure "pre-owned" aircraft which is to be modified for the role for 25 to 30 years. An Indian maintenance partner is also to be selected. An additional refuelling aircraft was to be leased to provide training support for a period of two to three years until the delivery of these six aircraft starts.

As of 7 February 2024, the Defence Ministry was "considering" the ₹10,000 crore (equivalent to ₹110 billion or US$1.1 billion in 2026) acquisition proposal from the Indian Air Force. The Defence Acquisition Council (DAC) – chaired by Defence Minister Rajnath Singh – cleared the acquisition under 'Buy Global' category enabling procurement from both foreign or Indian vendors.

On 28 March 2025, the Indian Ministry of Defence signed a contract with Metrea Management to supply one Boeing KC-135 Stratotanker on wet lease to the IAF within six months for training pilots of IAF and the Indian Navy for in-flight refuelling. The refuelling jet landed at Agra Air Force Station on 21 November.

As of 30 June 2025, the procurement is in the technical evaluation phase as three to four firms has submitted their bids. After finalising, an Indian maintenance partner will also be sought.

It was confirmed on 27 October 2025 that the Israel Aerospace Industries (IAI), in partnership with Hindustan Aeronautics Limited (HAL), is the frontrunner and only contender for the ₹8,000 crore (equivalent to ₹83 billion or US$880 million in 2026) project as others did not meet the requirements to be shortlisted. The firm has offered to modify pre-owned Boeing 767 into refuellers and supply them to the IAF. They have agreed to meet the 30% indigenous content clause, part of the offset agreement. The aircraft, with cargo and transport capabilities, will be converted in HAL facilities. The deal was cleared by the Defence Acquisition Council (DAC) at a cost of ₹9,000 crore (equivalent to ₹93 billion or US$990 million in 2026) on 29 December. As of 1 January 2026, a Cost Negotiation Committee (CNC) is being constituted to negotiate the price of the contract. The negotiation is to be followed by the proposal being moved to the Cabinet Committee on Security (CCS) for final approval for contract signing.

Reports in Israeli media from 1 November 2026 indicated that a contract worth US$905.7 million will be signed with IAI for converting six commercial Boeing 767 airliners into refuelling aircraft configuration for IAF. The deliveries are expected between 2028 and 2030.

While this project was meant to acquire converted commercial aircraft for the role, another tender is expected to be issued to acquire six purpose-built aircraft.

===== Previous attempts =====
The Ilyushin Il-78MKI aircraft fitted with Cobham Mk.32B air refuelling pods were the first dedicated mid-air refuellers of the Indian Air Force. The order was placed in 2002 and deliveries were undertaken in 2003-2004 at a per unit cost of ₹132 crore (equivalent to ₹510 crore or US$55 million in 2026). The aircraft were built at Tashkent Aviation Production Association plant using unfinished airframes.

A tender or the Request for Proposal (RfP) for further procurement of six FRAs was launched in 2006 and was sent to Lockheed Martin, Boeing, EADS (now, Airbus) and Ilyushin. The Airbus A330 MRTT was selected against Il-78MKI after the technical and commercial evaluation in May 2009. The others did not respond to the tender. However, the tender, worth ₹6,000 crore (equivalent to ₹150 billion or US$1.6 billion in 2026), had been scrapped in January 2010 due to the finance ministry’s concerns over bid competitiveness and the MRTT’s pricing. While Ilyushin offered a better price, IAF sought the MRTT due to its better capabilities.

Another tender, worth ₹9,000 crore (equivalent to ₹140 billion or US$1.5 billion in 2026), was launched on 16 September 2010 and requests for proposal were sent to all the vendors involved earlier along with Antonov. While Lockheed Martin and Boeing did not respond to the tender, Antonov had been disqualified on technical fields. The commercial bids from Airbus and Ilyushin was opened in November 2012 where the quoted base price for Il-78 was lower than A330 MRTT. However, the MRTT had a better value and was selected as L1 bidder when maintenance and fuel costs were included as factors. This calculation was as per the government’s new Life‑Cycle Cost (LCC) evaluation in its new Defence Procurement Procedure (DPP) of 2008—which assesses total ownership costs over an aircraft’s service life. By January 2013, India chose the MRTT as the "preferred bid" after a series of flight tests which included refuelling multiple fighter jet types using the aircraft along with operations from high-altitude airbases. Airbus expected the deal to be finalised by the end of that year. However, in July 2016, Airbus was notified by the Indian MoD that the RFP was again retracted. After ceasing negotiations and scrapping the $2 billion worth tender due to "very high" life cycle costs as well as objections for the LCC calculations, the Indian Air Force also considered "direct strategic purchase" of the FRAs for its immediate requirements. The new FRA fleet was to be based at Panagarh Air Force Station in the eastern sector. Another factor for cancellation was an ongoing CBI probe in India on a separate deal that Aribus signed with India's Civil Aviation Ministry. Airbus was cleared of allegations in 2024.

In October 2016, it was reported that Boeing had officially offered its KC-46 Pegasus aircraft for the Indian Air Force. They had also sent a team of representatives to brief Indian officials including the then Defence Minister of India Manohar Parrikar of the capabilities of their product.

In August 2017, the Comptroller and Auditor General of India reported the low serviceability rate of Il-78MKI after a study during 2010 to 2016. The report stated non-availability of hangars, poor serviceability of the aerial refuelling pods (ARPs), poor maintenance support from the Original Equipment Manufacturer (OEM), lack of avionics upgrades from 1980s technology, long timelines for engine and other upgrades leaving the fleet unavailable.

==== ISTAR aircraft ====
Since 2023, the Indian Air Force is planning to acquire three aircraft for Intelligence, Surveillance, Target Acquisition, and Reconnaissance (ISTAR) capabilities. As of 2025, the project, worth ₹10,000 crore (equivalent to ₹100 billion or US$1.1 billion in 2026), is expected to be cleared by the government in a high-level meeting "soon". These aircraft are meant to operate at high-altitude from stand-off ranges to carry out its role. While the aircraft will be bought from overseas firms such as Boeing or Bombardier, an ISTAR suite, already developed, tested and proven by DRDO's Centre for Airborne Systems (CABS), will be fitted onboard in India. This execution layout is similar to that followed during Netra AEW&CS. It will provide India strategic air-to-ground surveillance and strike coordination capabilities.

On 3 July 2025, the Defence Acquisition Council — under the Ministry of Defence and chaired by Defence Minister Rajnath Singh — authorised 10 capital acquisition proposal worth ₹1.05 lakh crore (equivalent to ₹1.1 trillion or US$12 billion in 2026). This included three ISTAR aircraft (also dubbed as "spy planes") for the Air Force along with Armoured Recovery Vehicles, Electronic Warfare System, Integrated Common Inventory Management System for the Tri-Services (logistics maintenance) and Surface-to-Air Missiles for Army as well as Moored Mines (DRDO-developed Pressure-Based Moored Mines), Mine Counter Measure Vessels, Super Rapid Gun Mount and Submersible Autonomous Vessels for the Navy.

The CABS has reportedly selected Bombardier Global 6500 as the platform for the project in December 2025. The aircraft's sensor suite will include synthetic-aperture radar, moving target indicator and ELINT systems.

=== Helicopters ===
- HAL Prachand – The IAF will deploy indigenously developed HAL Prachand for its combat operations, complementing the Boeing AH-64D Apache of the Indian Army and Air Force, after the operational certificate is granted. The Indian Air Force has placed an order for 66 Prachand helicopters.
- HAL Light Utility Helicopter – In March 2021, the Ministry of Defence placed an initial order of six light utility helicopters for the Indian Airforce. The deliveries are expected to commence from August 2022.
- Reconnaissance and Surveillance Helicopters (RSH) – In order to replace Chetak and Cheetah helicopters in the Indian Armed Forces, the Ministry of Defence had issued a Request for Information (RFI) for the procurement of 200 light helicopters under the RSH programme in August 2025. Under the programme, 120 units and 80 units are to be procured for the Indian Army and Air Force, respectively. Specifying the technical requirements, the RFI mentioned that the suppliers are expected to be Indian vendors partnering with original equipment manufacturers (OEM). The helicopters are expected to be capable of undertaking reconnaissance, surveillance and search and rescue operations in day and night. The requirement include at least one hardpoint per side for surveillance equipment, podded guns, articulated guns, air-to-air missiles or anti-tank missiles. The first Light Utility Helicopter (LUH) tender was launched in 2008 for 197 helicopters (133 for IA and 64 for IAF) but was cancelled in 2014. Later, India moved ahead with the proposal of Russian Helicopters to produce Ka-226T in India. The proposal included 60 helicopters to be directly purchased and 140 be produced in India by Indo-Russian Helicopters Pvt Ltd, a joint venture of HAL, Russian Helicopters and Rosoboronexport. However, the deal was not signed due to the stringent ToT demands and Safran Helicopter Engines denying to supply its Arrius 2G1 engine to Russia. The Defence Acquisition Council (DAC) approved the procurement of Light Multi Role Helicopters (LMRH) for the Indian Army and Air Force on 26 October 2026. The orders would be split between L1 and L2 contenders.
  - Bell Textron, along with its Indian partner Max AeroSpace and Aviation, is expected to offer Bell 407 helicopter in the competition.
  - Airbus will also offer the Made-in-India H125 along with Tata Advanced Systems. It was one of the shortlisted designs in the 2008 LUH tender.
  - Leonardo and Adani Defence & Aerospace have offered the AW109 TrekkerM design under a strategic partnership to establish India's helicopter manufacturing ecosystem.

=== Unmanned aerial vehicles ===
- Remotely Piloted Strike Aircraft (RPSA) – The Technology Perspective and Capability Roadmap (TPCR) 2025 outlines the requirement of stealth unmanned combat aerial vehicles (UCAVs) with a service life of over 20 years. The Army and Air Force are expected operate between 90–100 and 40–50 stealth UCAVs, respectively.
  - The UCAV is expected to achieve supersonic speeds with supercruise and low observability capabilities. The internal weapons payload is expected within a range of 4,000 kg (8,800 lb) and should be compatible with both air-to-air and air-to-ground missiles. The UCAVs should exhibit Manned-Unmanned Teaming (MUMT) including loyal wingman role. The system should feature an AI-driven programmable flight profile with advanced avionics, LPI radar, EO/IR/SWIR targeting, secure low-latency SATCOM/B-LOS and LOS links, conformal defensive stores, and autonomous aerial refueling. It must also achieve a service ceiling of at least 15 km while supporting offensive and defensive manoeuvres.
  - The IAF is expected to procure four squadrons with 20 aircraft each. The in-development DRDO Ghatak is anticipated to fulfil the requirement.
- MQ-9B SkyGuardian – On 28 July 2024, 8 MQ-9Bs were ordered for the Indian Air Force.
- Pseudo-satellite – Indian Air Force plans to induct 3 such platforms, also called High-Altitude Platform System (HAPS), and its acssociated support equipment. A Request for Information (RFI) was released by the IAF with a response deadline of 20 June. As specified in the document, the platform must have an endurance of 48 hours, operational altitude of 20 km (66,000 ft). The RFI also mentioned that the HAPS would have a minimum data links and telemetry range of 150 km (93 mi) during line of sight mode, a SATCOM range of 400 km (250 mi) and a detection range of 50 km (31 mi) from operational altitude. The HAPS has integrable with electro-optical and infrared cameras as well as electronic and communication intelligence payloads. The HAPS, capable of all-weather, day-and-night operations, is to be delivered within 18 months of signing the contract. The Defence Acquisition Council (DAC) of India's Defence Ministry cleared multiple procurement projects including that of Fixed Wing-based HAPS (FW-HAPS) for the Indian Air Force on 3 July 2026.
- Medium-altitude long-endurance UAV – The Indian Armed Forces aims to procure 87 MALE UAVs at a cost of ₹20,000 crore (equivalent to ₹210 billion or US$2.2 billion in 2026). The UAVs will be developed by Indian firms in collaboration with foreign partners, with an expected indigenous content of over 60%. Additionally, the long-range drones are expected to be integrated and armed with air-to-ground missiles and laser-guided bombs for precision strike missions. The drones should also be capable of executing electronic warfare and ISR missions, i.e., Intelligence, Surveillance and Reconnaissance. Additionally, a maintenance contract worth ₹11,000 crore (equivalent to ₹110 billion or US$1.2 billion in 2026) for the drones will also be signed with the Original Equipment Manufacturer (OEM) for the logistical other operational support. The order will be split for two firms, which would be lowest bidders, at a 64:36 ratio in favour for the lower bidder. The orders will be executed at two separate production facilities, one operated by each firm.
  - On 5 August 2025, the Defence Acquisition Council (DAC) accorded the Acceptance of Necessity (AoN) for the project which is being led by the IAF. Now, the DAC clearance will be followed by the armed forces releasing an expression of interest (EoI) for Indian firms to bid for the contract followed by trials and final commercial negotiations.
  - On 22 August, Flying Wedge Defence and Aerospace (FWDA) unveiled its combat-capable MALE UAV, named after Kaala Bhairav. The drone has been designated as Economic and Efficient Autonomous Aircraft (E2A2). With an indigenous content of 80%, it features a twin-boom configuration for STOL operations. The aircraft has an endurance of 30 hours, a range of 3,000 km (1,900 mi), a payload capacity of 91 kg (201 lb) and a cruising speed of 42–52 m/s (150–190 km/h). The platform employs artificial intelligence for adaptive target acquisition, autonomous flight path planning as well as real-time combat decision-making. During the unveiling event, the company screened the aircraft's test flight and also announce that they have secured an export order worth US$25 million from a South Asian nation as part of a US$30 million strategic deal. The executives of the company also compared the performance of 10 Kaala Bhairavs to one Predator drone, claiming that one Kaala Bhairav costs one-tenth of the latter.
  - On 31 October, Larsen & Toubro (L&T) formed a strategic partnership with General Atomics Aeronautical Systems Inc. (GA-ASI) to participate in the MALE RPAS programme for the Indian Armed Forces. L&T would be the prime bidder in the tender with GA-ASI as the technology partner. One of the MQ-series aircraft will be offered to the Armed Forces. The MQ-1C Gray Eagle is reportedly expected to be on offer.
  - In November, the trials were expected to be conducted within the next six months. Also, around 24 Indian firms had reportedly responded to the tender, with foreign firms including Elbit Systems, Israel Aerospace Industries (IAI), General Atomics and Bell Textron having collaborated with their Indian partners. IAI has tied up with Hindustan Aeronautics Limited (HAL) and ELCOM to offer the IAI Heron's Mk II variant. Meanwhile, Elbit Systems has tied Adani Defence Systems Limited (ADSL) and has reportedly offered the Hermes 900.
  - The deadline to respond to the tender was 16 June 2026 by which 10 Indian private and public sector companies had responded. These included HAL, Solar Defence and Aerospace Limited (SDAL), ADSL, Tata Advanced Systems Limited (TASL), L&T and Raphe mPhibr Limited.
- Vayu Baan – It is an air-launched effects (ALE) project where an unmanned aircraft system will be released from a helicopter and carries a surveillance equipment or precision-guided munition (kamikaze drone) as the payload. Once released, the small UAS will deploy its wings, activate its propulsion and relay real-time video to the operator. If required, the done can also strike a target with its warhead. They will be equipped with electro-optical and infrared sensors for target identification, with the ability to operate in GPS-jammed environments. They will have a designed range of around 50 km (31 mi) and endurance of 30 minutes.
  - As of March 2026, IAF's Directorate of Aerospace Design (DAD) released a request for proposal to invite domestic vendors to partner in the development project.

=== Trainers ===
- HAL HTT-40 – In 2011, reports indicated that the IAF had selected Pilatus Aircraft to supply 75 PC-7 Mk.II Ms to serve the role of basic trainer aircraft at a cost of $1 billion. The contract was signed at a cost of ₹2,895.63 crore (US$541.87 million) or 500 million Swiss francs in May 2012. The contract included an option clause with a validity of three years to acquire 38 additional aircraft. In 2014, the Indian Ministry of Defence was interested in purchasing an additional 106 aircraft from Pilatus in a separate deal worth ₹7,000 crore (US$1.31 billion), with a majority to be produced in India. A total of 53 aircraft had been delivered by then. However, on 28 February 2015, it was reported that the Ministry of Defence had selected 68 HAL HTT-40 trainers and 38 Pilatus trainers to replace its current trainer aircraft fleet, stating that this move was "commercially viable" under the "Make in India" programme. In 2017, HAL CMD reported that HAL would soon sign a contract for 106 HTT-40 aircraft for delivery to the air force. In May 2020, the then Chief of the Air Staff, Air Chief Marshal R. K. S. Bhadauria announced a plan to shelve the order for the additional Pilatus PC-7s in favour of the indigenous HAL HTT-40. At DefExpo 2022, IAF and HAL concluded ₹6,800 crore (equivalent to ₹79 billion or US$840 million in 2026) crore contract for 70 HTT-40s, while another 36 could be procured after operationalisation of the type.
- Advanced trainer aircraft – In August 2026, the IAF issued a Request for Information (RFI) to procure 150 Stage III (F) trainers to replace the existing fleet of 104 BAE Hawks. The responses are to be submitted within the 5 October deadline while the trials will be conducted in a no-cost-no-commitment basis. The Request for Proposal (RfP) is expected around December 2027 while deliveries are expected to commence within 60 months of signing the contract. In the procurement, the technical and commercial bids shall be submitted separately. The requirements of the new trainers include glass cockpit, HOTAS configuration, fly-by-wire control and navigation systems integrating NavIC, GPS and GLONASS. Leonardo will offer M-346 Integrated Training Solution (ITS) with M-346 T Block 20. KAI will offer T-50 trainer and could partner with the Indian firm MKU to offer MRO.

=== Missiles ===
==== Cruise missiles ====
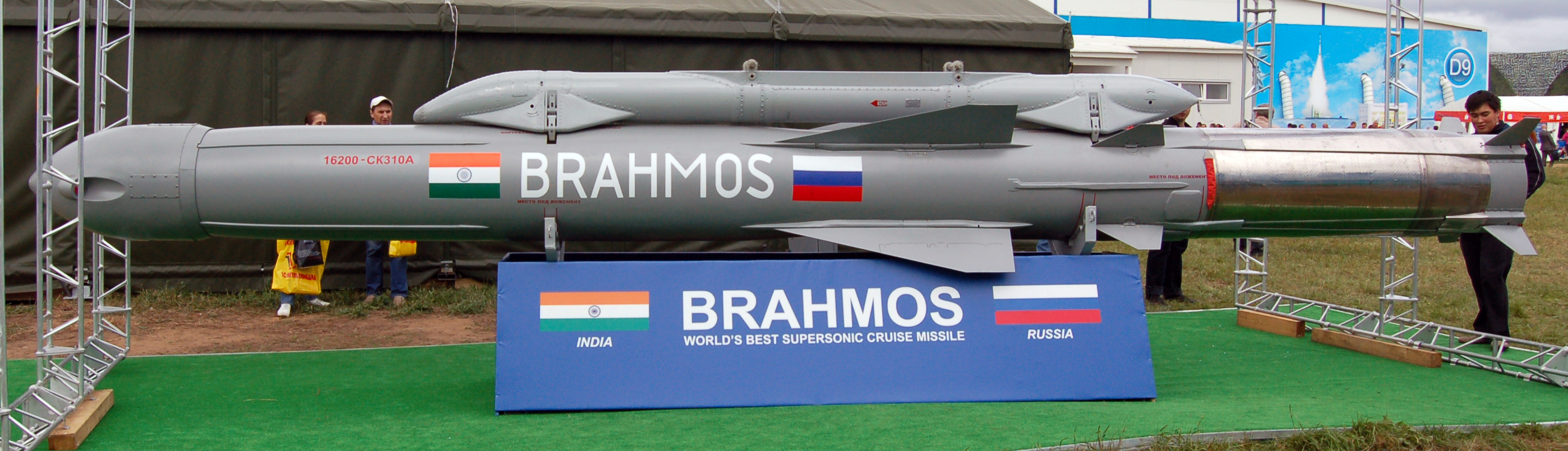
The air-launched version of BrahMos

DRDO has developed the air-launched version of the BrahMos cruise missile in a joint venture with Russia's NPO Mashinostroyeniya. The IAF has signed a contract with Russia to upgrade 40 Su-30MKIs to give them the capability of carrying the BrahMos cruise missile by 2012.

DRDO has also developed the nuclear-capable Nirbhay cruise missile, which is capable of hitting targets at 1,000 to 1,500 km (620 to 930 mi; 540 to 810 nmi) at 2 m (6 ft 7 in) accuracy.

==== Hypersonic missiles ====
BrahMos-II or BrahMos-2 or BrahMos Mark II is a hypersonic cruise missile currently under joint development by India's Defence Research and Development Organisation and Russia's NPO Mashinostroyenia, which have together formed BrahMos Aerospace. It is the second of the BrahMos series of cruise missiles. The BrahMos-II is expected to have a range of 1,000 km (620 mi; 540 nmi) and a speed of Mach 8. During the cruise stage of flight, the missile will be propelled by a scramjet airbreathing jet engine. Other details, including production cost and physical dimensions of the missile, are yet to be published. The planned operational range of the BrahMos-II had initially been restricted to 290 km (180 mi; 160 nmi) as Russia is a signatory to the Missile Technology Control Regime (MTCR), which prohibits it from helping other countries develop missiles with ranges above 300 km (190 mi; 160 nmi). However, subsequent to India becoming an MTCR signatory in 2014, the parameters for Brahmos 2 will get enhanced. Its top speed will be double that of the current BrahMos-I, and it has been described as the fastest cruise missile in the world. Testing was planned to start in 2020 but has been delayed.

==== Surface-to-air missile systems ====
In 2018–19, India agreed with Russia to procure the S-400 surface-to-air missile system worth ₹35,000 crore (approx.). As per the agreement, five squadrons of S-400 missiles were set to be delivered by Russia to India. As of 2023, out of five squadrons, three were delivered.

The Indian Air Force has placed order for 18 MRSAM squadrons with each squadron having 3 launcher vehicles, carrying 8 missiles each.

Indian Air Force has plans to deploy 5 squadrons of a multi-layer long range air defence system being developed by the Defence Research and Development Organisation under Project Kusha.

== Under development projects ==
=== Fighters ===
==== Advanced Medium Combat Aircraft (AMCA) ====
The Advanced Medium Combat Aircraft (AMCA) is a twin-engine, 5th generation stealth multirole fighter under development by ADA. It will complement the HAL Tejas, the Sukhoi Su-30MKI, MWF and the Dassault Rafale in the Indian Air Force. The first flight is expected to be by 2028-29 and serial production is expected to start from 2035. The project has been cleared by Cabinet Committee on Security and is in prototype development stage.

==== Omni-role Combat Aircraft (ORCA) ====
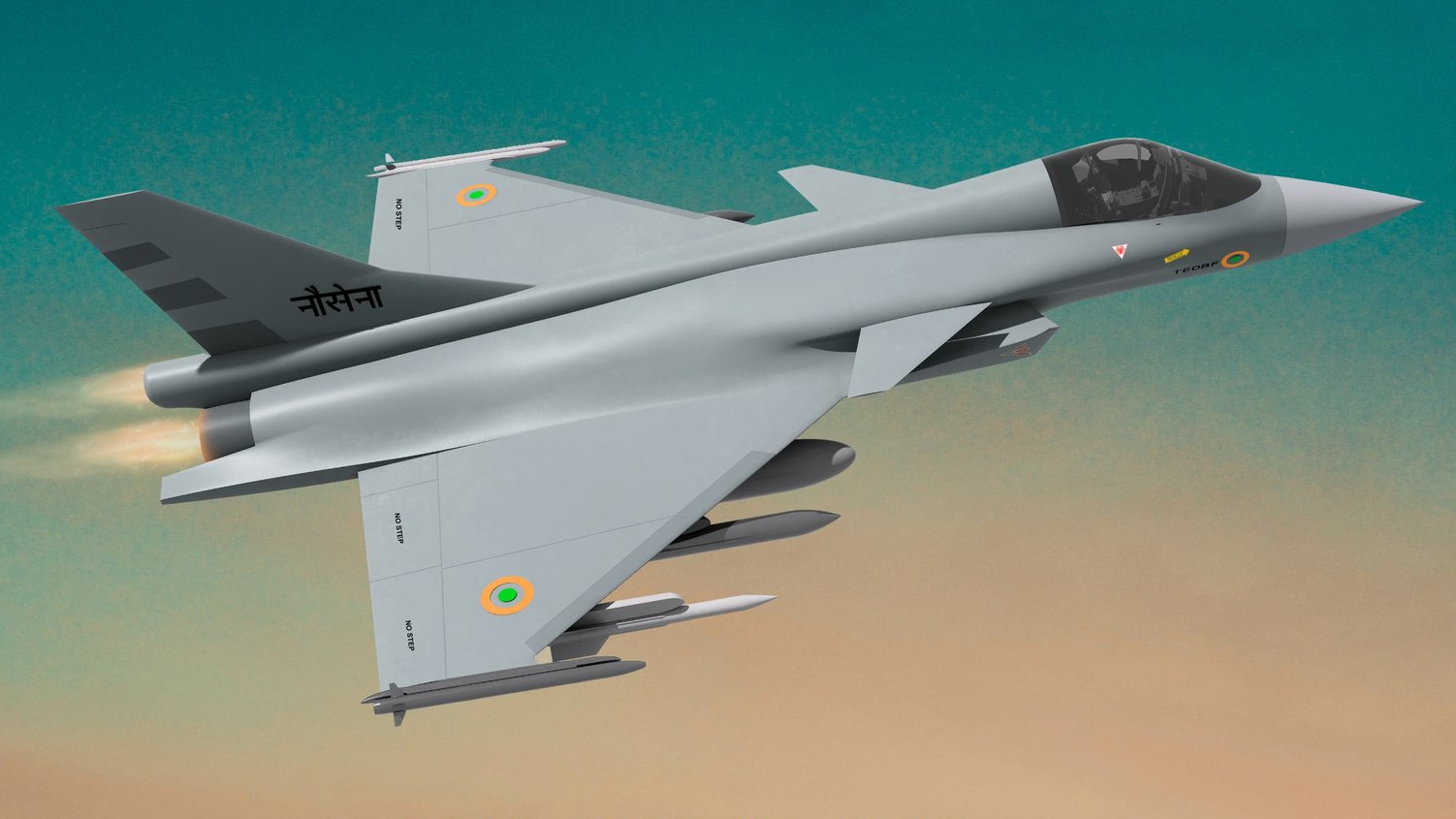
Design of HAL TEDBF

The Omni Role Combat Aircraft is a concept to design and develop a twin-engine omni role fighter, similar to the Rafale category. The design of the Omni Role Combat Aircraft (ORCA), an Indian Air Force variant of the Twin Engine Deck Based Fighter (TEDBF), with significant design differences, was being studied as of 2020. The first flight is expected in 2032 with induction into the forces by 2038.

==== Tejas Mk 2 (Medium Weight Fighter) ====
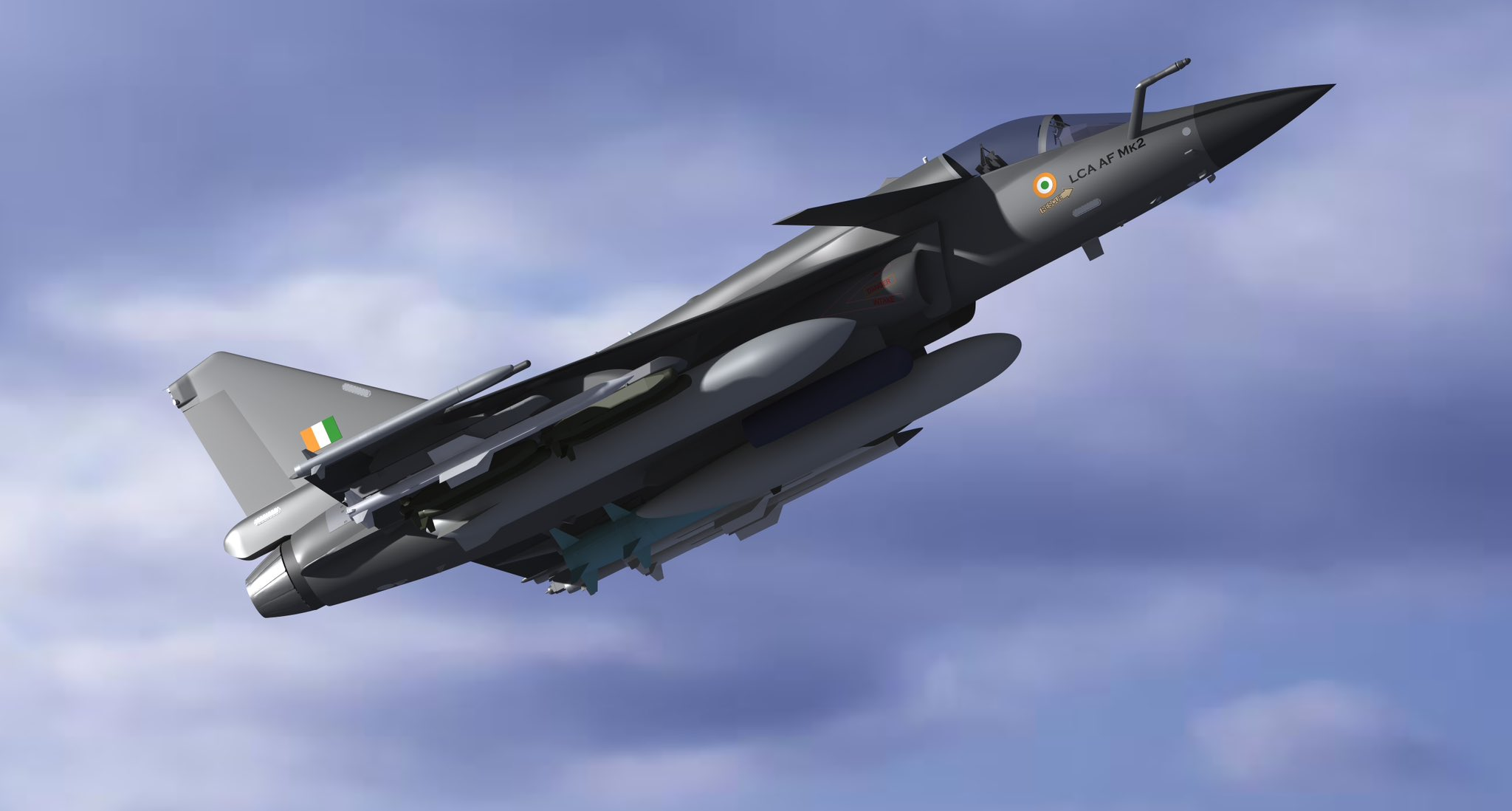
HAL Tejas Mk2

The HAL Tejas Mark 2 (also known as Medium Weight Fighter or HAL MWF) is a planned single-engine, delta wing, multirole fighter designed by the Aeronautical Development Agency (ADA) and Hindustan Aeronautics Limited (HAL) for the Indian Air Force (IAF). It is a further development of the HAL Tejas, or the Light Combat Aircraft (LCA), programme which began in the 1980s to replace India's ageing MiG-21 fighters. The Tejas Mk 2 is being designed to replace multiple strike-fighter types in service including SEPECAT Jaguars, Dassault Mirage 2000s and Mikoyan MiG-29s.

There is confirmation from the chief of the Aeronautical Development Agency that MWF will shed its "Tejas" stamp and get a completely new name altogether during or after its first flight. Metal cutting for the prototypes began in January 2021. The first prototype was expected to be rolled out at the end of 2025, however it is now delayed and the first flight is expected to take in Q2 2026. A total of four prototypes are initially planned.

=== Uncrewed wingman ===
The HAL Combat Air Teaming System is a planned uncrewed and crewed combat aircraft air teaming system being developed by Hindustan Aeronautics Limited. The system will consist of a crewed fighter aircraft acting as "mothership" of the system and a set of swarming UAVs and UCAVs governed by the main aircraft. A twin-seated HAL Tejas is likely to be the main fighter aircraft.

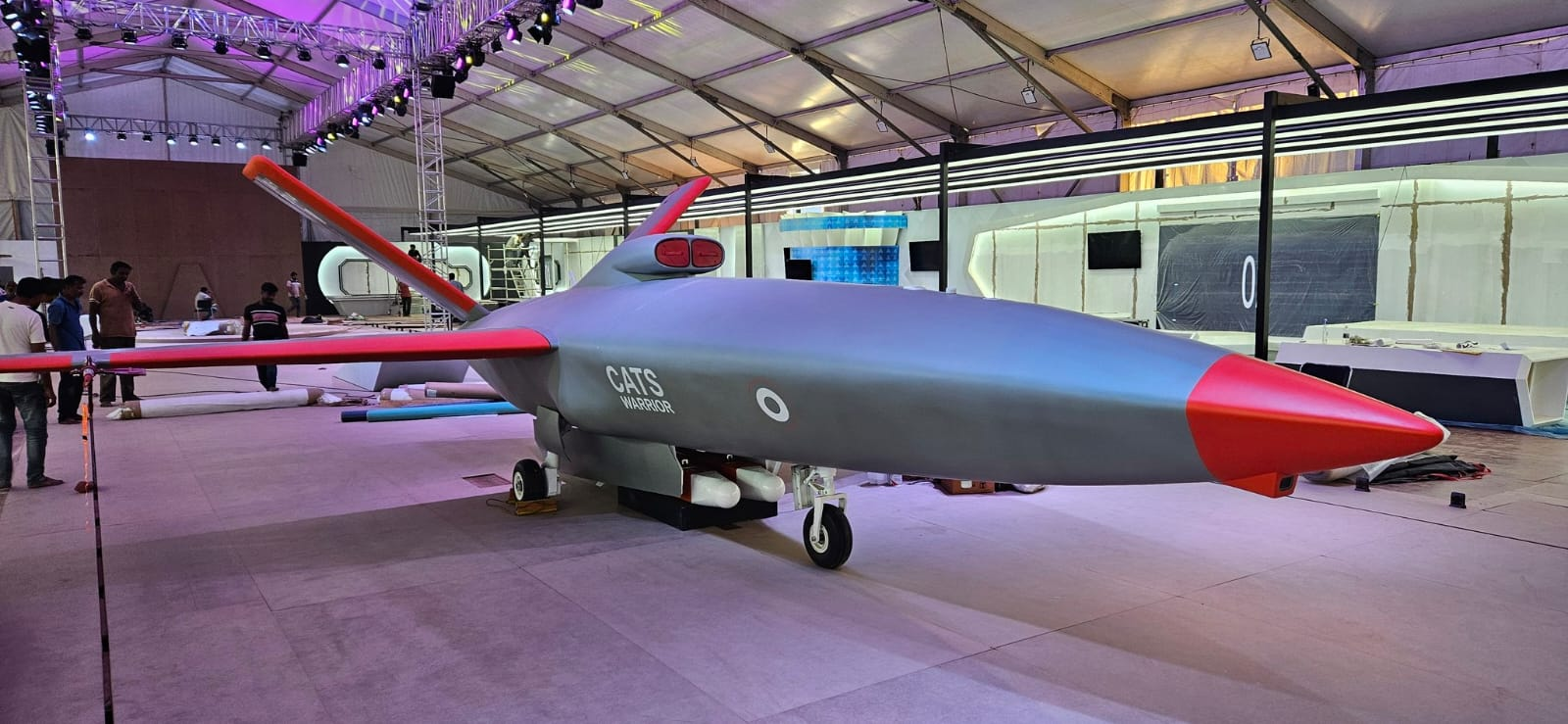
HAL CATS Warrior prototype at Aero India 2025

HAL CATS Warrior part of HAL Combat Air Teaming System is an armed stealth drone which will team up and fight alongside IAF fighters to hit high-value enemy targets. It is designed to carry out MUM-T Operations. It will be the first line of offense in operations against heavily defended, integrated air defence networks. An Indian defence startup is also a part of the mission team.

Each drone will initially be armed with a single precision-guided weapon, such as an air-to-surface missile or a laser-guided bomb. Future versions of the platform will also be able to fire air-to-air missiles to target enemy fighters. The Uncrewed Wingman will be connected to a heavily upgraded IAF SEPECAT Jaguar attack aircraft (called the Jaguar Max); pilots onboard will assign specific tasks to each of the uncrewed drones which fly alongside the fighter. The drone will also operate with other platforms. The first flight is expected by 2022 & induction by 2029.

HAL is designing & developing AI-powered, stealthy autonomous swarm drones known as ALFA-S in collaboration with a private firm in Bangalore. Research and development work will be completed in two years and the first flight is expected by 2022.

The ALFA-S swarming drones will have two folding wings. They will be fitted inside canisters mounted under the wings of IAF aircraft.

Each swarm could have dozens of individual drones. If detected, some of the drones would be shot down, but the sheer numbers of the swarm would overwhelm enemy defences such as surface-to-air missile units to ensure a high probability of mission success. The first drone prototypes are likely to be deployed from Hawk Advanced Jet Trainers being built, under licence, at Hindustan Aeronautics. Ultimately though, the drones are meant to be launched from any Indian Air Force aircraft - fighter jets and transports.

The plan to develop indigenous swarming drones is a part of the Combat Air Teaming System project or CATS, which has three distinct elements. In addition to the ALFA-S swarm drones, a robotic wingman, meant to accompany a crewed fighter jet into combat is being also being developed.

The final element of CATS is the development of an ultra-high altitude drone meant to remain flying for up to three weeks at a stretch while providing real-time images and video.

The government strongly backs the Combat Air Teaming System initiative as part of the Make in India programme, which encourages Indian defence manufacturers to focus on core research and development projects towards the next-generation requirements of India's armed forces. In 2018, the Defence Ministry set up iDEX, or Innovations for Defence Excellence under the Defence Innovation Organisation, a not-for-profit company meant to provide high-level policy guidance for high-tech indigenous ventures working on India's defence and aerospace needs.

=== Transports ===
The IAF had also placed an order for 15 NAL Saras light transport aircraft designed by the National Aerospace Laboratories (NAL). The manufacturer has stated that the Indian Air Force intended to place an order for up to 45 aircraft. National Aeronautics Limited (NAL) has stopped all work on NAL Saras as the funding for the project stopped by end of 2013 due to cost overruns and inability to reduce the weight of the aircraft. The development of the Saras was restarted by the National Aeronautics Laboratories in February 2017.

=== Trainers ===
==== HLFT-42 ====
The Hindustan Lead-in Fighter Trainer (HLFT-42), under development by Hindustan Aeronautics Limited (HAL), is a planned next-generation supersonic 16.5-tonne jet trainer for the Indian Air Force. It will feature advanced avionics including AESA radar, Electronic Warfare Suite, IRST, and Fly-by-Wire controls, designed for combat training with potential for conversion into a fighter aircraft.

==== HAL HJT-36 Yashas ====
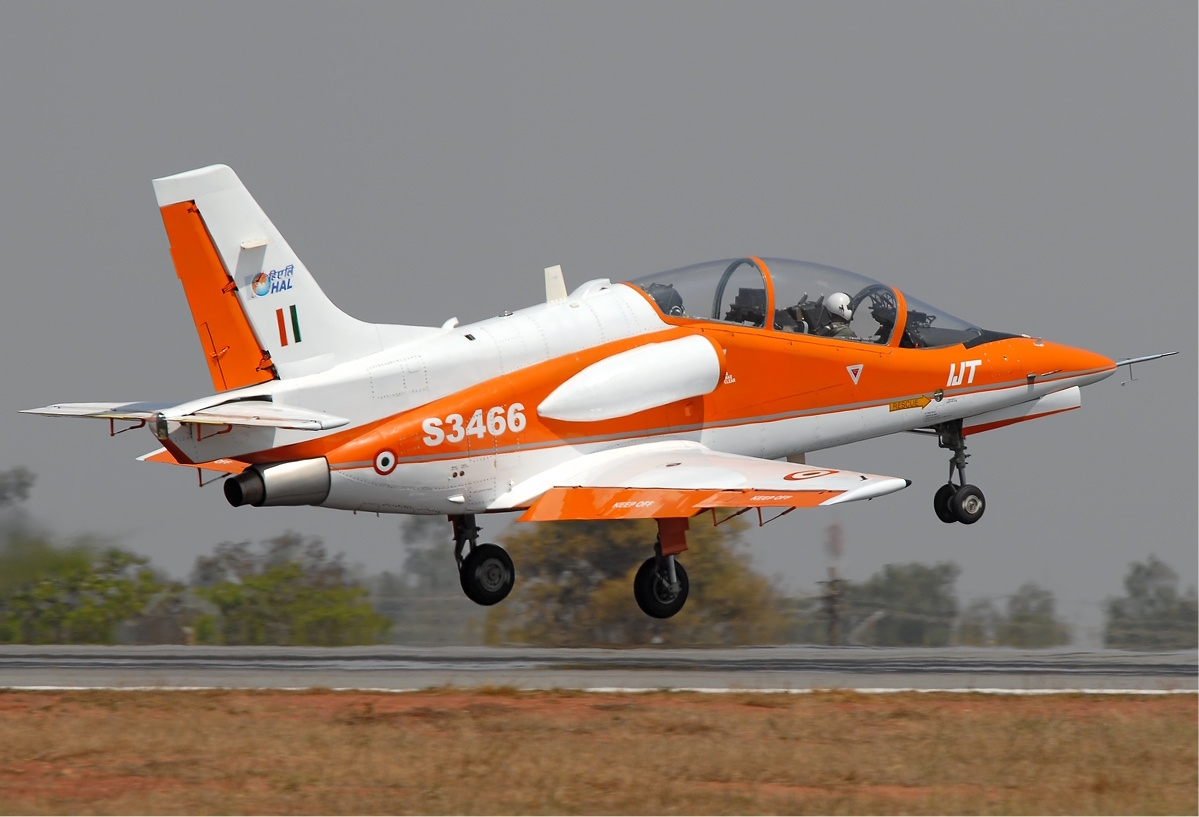
HAL HJT-36 Yashas

HAL has developed the HAL HJT-36 Yashas intermediate jet trainer aircraft for the IAF, which carried out its maiden test flight in 2003. These aircraft are scheduled to replace the aging HJT-16 Kiran mk.I. The Indian Air Force has placed an order for 73 aircraft, of which the first 12 are in production. The order by the Indian Air Force could eventually grow to 250 aircraft. Two prototype aircraft have been built. These aircraft have undergone 280 test flights.

=== Helicopters ===
- Indian Multi Role Helicopter (IMRH) – The HAL Medium Lift Helicopter (MLH) is a planned large rotorcraft in the 10–15 tonne class. The three branches of the Indian Armed Forces are envisioned to be major customers for helicopter. According to HAL, the MLH is to be in the same class as the Russian Mil Mi 17 and is to serve as its planned replacement in all three forces.

=== Uncrewed aerial vehicles ===
The DRDO is developing a Medium Altitude Long Endurance Uncrewed Aerial Vehicle (UAV) called the Rustom (English: Warrior) for all three branches of the Indian Armed Forces. The Rustom will replace / supplement the Heron UAVs in service with the Indian armed forces.

DRDO is also developing the DRDO Ghatak which is an uncrewed combat aerial vehicle (UCAV) for the Indian Air Force. The design work on the UCAV is carried out by Aeronautical Development Agency (ADA). The AURA UCAV will be a tactical stealth aircraft built largely with composites, and capable of delivering laser-guided strike weapons. It would be a stealthy flying-wing concept aircraft with internal weapons and a turbofan engine.

=== Surface-to-air missile systems ===
Defence Research and Development Organisation (DRDO) has nearly finished the developmental trial of the New Generation missile of Akash SAM known as Akash-NG. Akash-NG is developed to provide a cheap alternative for the Barak 8. It will have the same range of 70 km (43 mi; 38 nmi) with all-weather and all-terrain capability. The missile will be able to neutralise and destroy fighter aircraft, cruise missiles and air-to-surface missiles as well as ballistic missiles. It will use Ku band active radar seeker. The missile is expected to come into service in 2022 and will be produced by Bharat Dynamics Limited (BDL) and Bharat Electronics (BEL).

DRDO is also working on Project Kusha (XRSAM) long-range surface-to-air missile defence system. It will be used to bridge the gap between MR-SAM (100 km [62 mi; 54 nmi]) and S-400 (400 km [250 mi; 220 nmi]) Air Defence System and will be using spin-off technologies developed for country's Anti-Ballistic missile Defence system. The missile system will have a range of 250 km (160 mi; 130 nmi) against fighter jets, 350 km (220 mi; 190 nmi) against cruise missiles, sea skimming anti-ship missiles, AWACS and mid-air refuelers and will be capable of bringing down ballistic missiles and stealth fighters in the terminal stage.

== See also ==
- List of active Indian military aircraft
- Future of the Indian Navy
- List of equipment of the Indian Army
- List of ships of the Indian Navy
- List of active Indian Navy ships
- HAL AMCA
