= NPO Saturn AL-55 =

High performance turbofan engine manufactured by NPO Saturn Russia

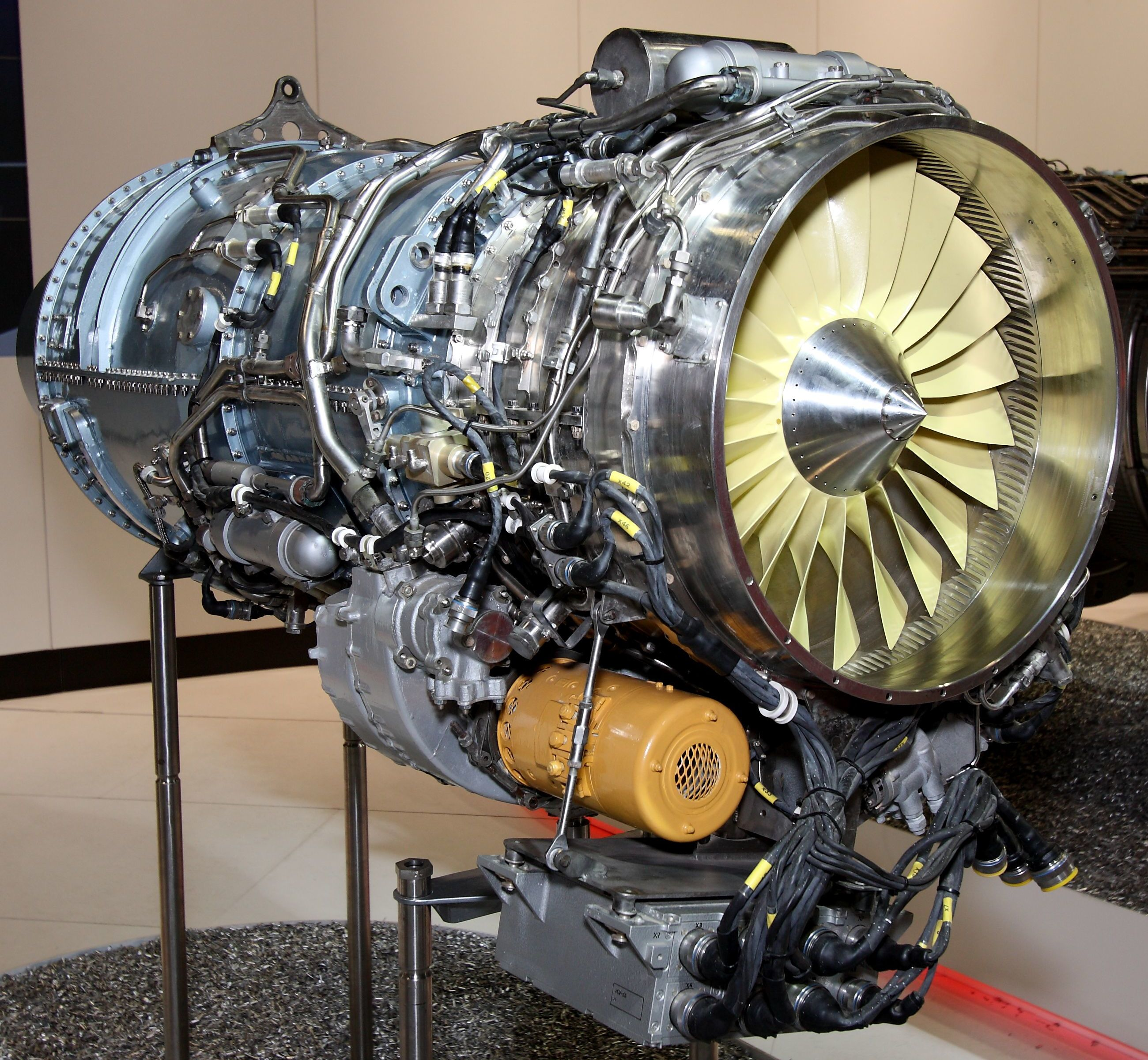
- The Jet engine AL-55 (The international aerospace salon MAKS-2011)
- Type: Turbofan
- National origin: Russia
- Manufacturer: NPO Saturn and serial production by Ufa Engine Industrial Association JSC
- Major applications: Originally designed for HAL HJT-36 Sitara

The NPO Saturn AL-55 is a high performance turbofan engine manufactured by NPO Saturn Russia, for powering advanced trainers, unmanned aerial vehicles (UAV) and light attack aircraft. A variant of the AL-55I powers the HAL HJT-36 Yashas Indian jet trainer.

== Development ==
India's Hindustan Aeronautics Limited, from 1999, was developing HAL HJT-36 Sitara, a subsonic intermediate jet trainer aircraft for the Indian Air Force to replace the ageing HAL HJT-16 Kiran.

The prototype aircraft was initially powered by a SNECMA Turbomeca Larzac 04-H-20 non-afterburning turbofan developing 14.12 kN of thrust. However, as stipulated by the 2005 Air Staff Qualitative Requirements (ASQRs) from the Air Force there was a requirement of higher thrust engines.

In April 2005, the Larzac engine was to be replaced by NPO Saturn AL-55I (16.9 kN) to meet training requirements. The AL-55I engine would be a Joint Venture of HAL and NPO Saturn and the deal for the development of the same was signed with Rosoboronexport in August. A funding of ₹159 crore (equivalent to ₹540 crore or US$64 million in 2023) by the Indian Ministry of Defence was released for the higher thrust engine development.

As per a CAG report on IJT, in February 2014, the engine developed (AL-55I) had a Total Technical Life (TTL) of only 300 hours against the required 3600 hours provided in the ASQR. However, by 2013, it was told that the contract for engine development was fulfilled and the JV intended to increase the TTL to 600 hours though IAF insisted a TTL of 1,200 hours. The increase of TTL was important as ASQR projected a "utilisation rate" of 30 hrs/month per aircraft which meant the engines needed to be replaced every 10 months.

On 14 July 2021, it was reported that the United Engine Corporation had deliver two units of AL-55I engines to HAL for the HJT-36 programme. The life cycle of the improved engines were increased to 1,200 hours . Earlier, 16 engines had been supplied to HAL for the prototypes and limited series production (LSP) aircraft. The engines were reportedly ready for licensed production in India. The new engines also had an improved thrust of 17.27 kN and also featured a reduction of over 50 kg weight.

By February 2025, UEC supplied 18 AL-55I engines to HAL for the project. The engines will undergo type certification followed by start of licensed production of the engines by HAL in India.

== Design ==
The design comprises five main features. It has a three-stage low pressure compressor, five stage high pressure chamber, an annular combustion chamber and a single stage high and low pressure turbines.

== Variants ==
AL-55
AL-55/I: A variant designed for licensed production in India.

== Applications ==
- HAL HJT-36 Sitara
- HAL HJT 39
- Mikoyan MiG-AT
- KB SAT SR-10

== Specifications ==
Data from UEC Saturn.

==== General characteristics ====
- Type: Double spool (two shaft) turbofan
- Length: 1,950 mm (76.77 in)
- Diameter: 590 mm (23.23 in)
- Dry weight: 315 kg

==== Components ====
- Compressor: two-spool, with 3-stage low-pressure (LP) and 5-stage high-pressure (HP) and one annular compressor
- Turbine: 1 LP stage and 1 HP stage

==== Performance ====
- Maximum thrust: 1,760 kgf (17.3 kN; 3,900 lbf) (take-off thrust)
- Overall pressure ratio: 17.5
- Bypass ratio: 0.515
- Air mass flow: 28.5 kg/s
- Turbine inlet temperature: 1445 Tc
- Specific fuel consumption: 0.69 kg/kgf.h (Specific fuel rate at the limiting point), 0.645 kg/kgf.h (Specific fuel rate in cruising mode)
- Thrust-to-weight ratio: 5.59 (take-off thrust)

== See also ==
- List of aircraft engines
