= HAL HJT 39 =

Proposed Indian Air Force jet trainer

HJT 39

General information
- Type: Lead-in fighter trainer
- National origin: India
- Manufacturer: Hindustan Aeronautics Limited
- Designer: Aircraft Research & Development Center (HAL)
- Status: Cancelled

History
- Developed from: HAL HJT-36 Sitara
- Developed into: HAL HLFT-42

The HAL HJT 39, aka CAT (Combat Air Trainer), was an Advanced Jet Trainer (AJT) project proposal by Hindustan Aeronautics Limited (HAL) for the Indian Air Force. The HAL HJT 39 CAT Programme was Announced at Aero India, February 2005, with a mockup of front fuselage and cockpit shown. It was projected to fly within three and a half years of go-ahead with airframe and engine commonality with HAL HJT-36 Sitara, and avionics comparable with those of HJT-36 and HAL Tejas.

== Design ==
The CAT was planned as a twin engine transonic "Lead in Fighter Trainer" (LIFT) with a very substantial ground attack capability with a maximum speed of 1,000 km/h.

The CAT was to feature Multi Function Displays (MFD) for tactical navigation, Radar Warning Receiver (RWR) and indigenous CSIO/BEL-developed Head Up Display (HUD) and Up Front Control Panel (UFCP), used on the LCA. The HUD would display both navigation and weapon aiming. CAT also features redundancy features like stand by instrumentation system, Fly-by-Wire (FBW), hands-on-throttle-and-stick HOTAS), INS along with GPS receiver, flight control computer and display processor. The avionics would be confirming 32-bit dual mil 1553B Bus Standard.

The Fly-by-wire planned to consist of two digital channels and one engine analog channel. Full Authority Digital Engine Control (FADEC) was to be implemented for better handling. Some other features of the modern cockpit are automatic pressure cabin and temperature control systems, zero / zero ejection seat and crew emergency escape system. Radar is optional, but a new radar is to be developed.

=== Airframe ===
Among the prominent External design features revealed were a moderately-swept wing, with no wing-body blending or wing root strakes, a prominent vertical fin. The low wing sweep will give a good low-speed performance and excellent handling characteristics essential for the trainer role. The wing will also have a clean leading edge, while having high-lift devices on the trailing edge, for good runway performance. The HJT-39 was to be an all-composite aircraft.

=== Cockpit ===
The CAT was Planned to have tandem seat configuration which lets the trainee sit in the Front Cockpit with considerable stagger between the front and rear seats. The cockpit was designed so that the vision for both the occupants was maximized. The trainer would have a bird's eye view of the trainee's action and controls. The cockpit will a state of the art glass cockpit having Head up Display (HUD), Head down instruments and weapon aiming controls.

=== Engine ===
In view of the ground attack requirements, it was to be powered by two NPO Saturn AL-55 turbofans of 2,200 kg thrust each, compared to the 1,800 kg thrust of the variant for the single-engined HJT-36 intermediate jet trainer.

=== Armament ===
CAT was to feature 5 hard points. The external stores with practice bombs, rockets, missiles and a gun in central fuselage.

The maximum takeoff weight with external stores was projected as 9,500 kg. The HJT-39 will also have a virtual training capability, with radar simulation, computerised training aids and the like. An item of optional equipment for the HJT-39 is an On-Board Oxygen Generation System (OBOGS).

in 2005, HAL planned to deliver a prototype in 39 months after the clearance from the government with the project cost of Rs 750 crore.

The project was most likely shelved with no further news. India later bought Hawk 132 AJTs.

== See also ==
- HAL HJT-36 Sitara

== External Source ==
- http://www.business-standard.com/india/news/hal-to-unveil-concept-combat-air-trainer/200342/
- https://web.archive.org/web/20110311025722/http://frontierindia.net/revisiting-indian-combat-air-trainer-project
