= HAL HLFT-42 =

Indian trainer aircraft project

Hindustan Lead in Fighter Trainer-42
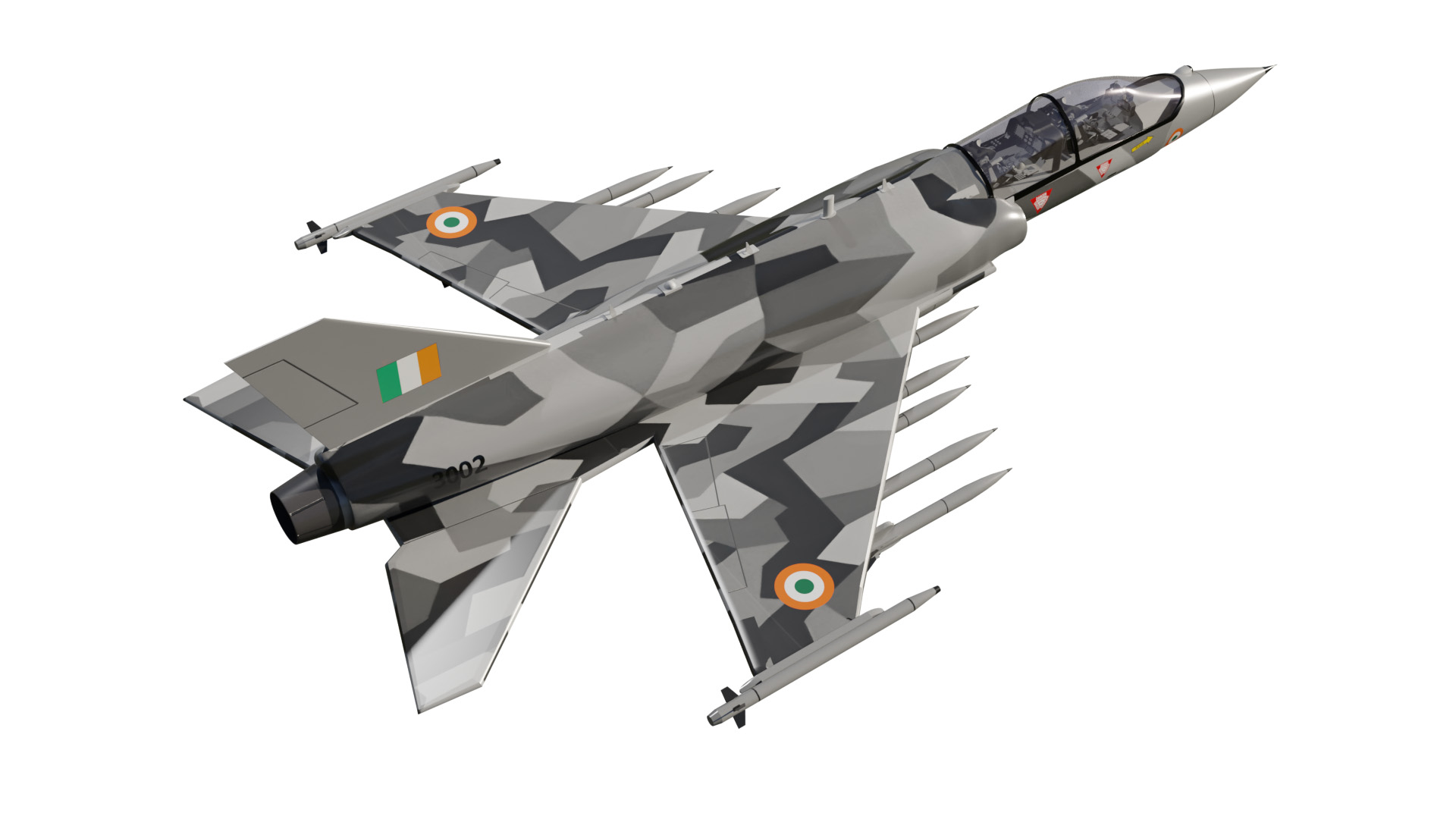
- HLFT-42 scale model displayed at Aero India (2023)

General information
- Type: Lead-in Fighter Trainer / Light Combat Aircraft
- National origin: India
- Designer: Aircraft Research and Design; Centre (HAL)
- Status: Under development
- Primary user: Indian Air Force (Intended)

The HAL HLFT-42 (Hindustan Lead-in Fighter Trainer – 42) is a design for an Indian lead-in fighter trainer proposed by Hindustan Aeronautics Limited (HAL). Designed as a next-generation supersonic trainer jet, it is planned to serve as an advanced trainer for upcoming HAL Tejas Mk2 and HAL AMCA fighter jets. Notably, the HLFT-42 will also be used as a fully-fledged fighter jet to perform combat missions. HAL unveiled the design of the scale model of the HLFT-42 at the 14th edition of Aero India (2023), which was held in Bangalore.

The Indian Air Force has expressed its intent to use the HLFT-42 in the future to replace the existing BAE Hawk 132 jet trainers.

== Development ==
The concept for the HLFT-42 was initiated in 2017, and officially unveiled at Aero India 2023 by Hindustan Aeronautics Limited (HAL). As of 14 February 2023, HAL reported that the HLFT-42 development project had reached an advanced stage of development and was expected to progress to the final design stage within the next four to five years. Its primary role is to replace the Indian Air Force's current BAE Hawk jet trainers and serve as the trainer for future fighter jets, including the HAL Tejas Mk2 and HAL AMCA. Additionally, it will be capable of performing combat missions.

In 2025, HAL revealed that it was redesigning the HLFT-42 following recommended actions from the IAF. HAL also plans to develop the HLFT-42 as the mothership for the HAL CATS unmanned weapon system, replace the previously planned derivatives of HAL Tejas Mk1A and the SEPECAT Jaguar. Reportedly HAL has not chosen an engine to power the aircraft.

In 2026, the future of the program was called into question when HAL offered the SPORT variant of the HAL Tejas Mk1 Trainer in response to the IAF's requirement of 150 lead-in fighter trainers.

== Design ==
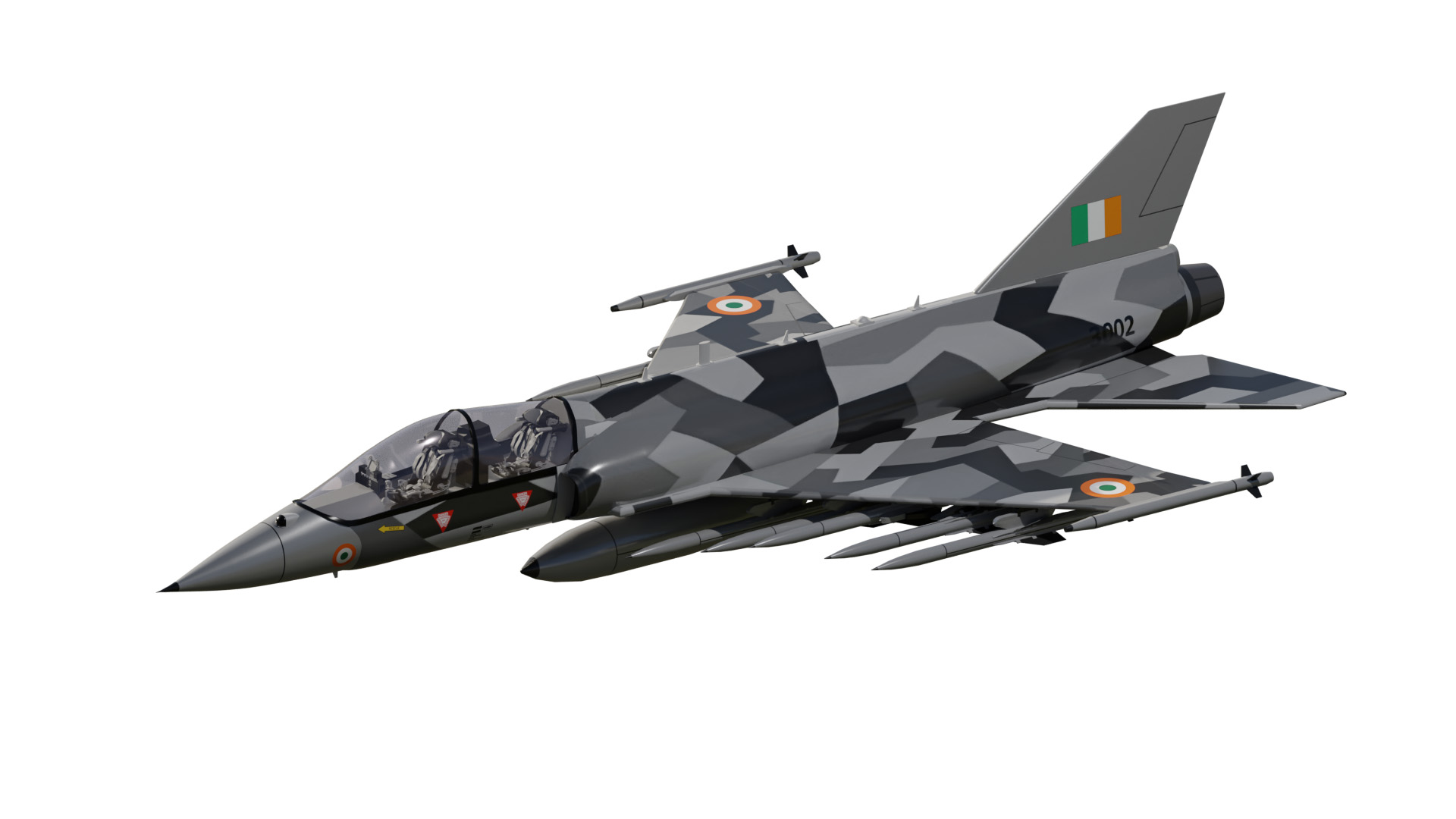
Design of Hindustan Lead in Fighter Trainer-42

HLFT-42 is designed as a single-engine, conventionally swept-wing aircraft with a bubble canopy. It is anticipated that maximum take-off weight of HLFT-42 will be around 16,500 kilograms. This aircraft will feature advanced avionics, including an active electronically scanned array radar, infrared search and track sensor and electronic warfare (EW) suite, all complemented by a FBW system. The HLFT-42 mock-up displayed at Aero India (2023) showcased three hardpoints under each wing, three under the fuselage, and one on each wing tip, totaling 11 hardpoints for integrating weapons. These weapons may include close-combat-missiles (like ASRAAM) and beyond-visual-range missiles (such as Astra), which effectively transform the HLFT-42 into a fully-fledged fighter jet.

== Specifications (Projected) ==
General characteristics

- Crew: 2
- Length: 52 ft 6 in (16 m)
- Wingspan: 29 ft 6 in (9 m)
- Height: 15 ft 1 in (4.6 m)
- Max takeoff weight: 36,376 lb (16,500 kg)
- Fuel capacity: 3,500 kg (7,716 lb) internal

Performance Armament

- Hardpoints: Total of 11 with 6 underwing 2 wingtip and 3 under fuselage; holding up to 5000 kg (11,023 lb) of payload , with provisions to carry combinations of:
  - Missiles:
    - Air-to-air missiles:
      - Astra Mk2
      - Astra Mk1
      - Astra IR
      - ASRAAM
    - Air-to-surface missiles:
      - BrahMos NG
      - LR-LACM
    - Anti-ship missiles:
      - NASM-MR
    - Anti-radiation missiles:
      - Rudram-1
      - Rudram-2
  - Bombs:
    - Precision-guided Bombs:
      - Smart Anti-Airfield Weapon
      - DRDO Gaurav
      - DRDO Gautham
      - HSLD-450/500
    - Laser-guided bombs:
      - DRDO Sudarshan
    - General-purpose bombs:
      - HSLD-100/250/450/500

Avionics

- LRDE Uttam AESA Radar
- CASDIC Radar warning receiver
- Laser warning receiver
  - Front Section Optronics:
- IRST Sensor
- Missile Approach Warning Receiver
  - External Pods:
- Self-Protection Jamming & Receiver Pods
- Laser-Targeting pod
  - Countermeasures:
- Chaffs
- Flares

== See also ==
Related development

- HAL HJT-16 Kiran
- HAL HJT-36 Yashas
- HAL HJT 39

Aircraft of comparable role, configuration, and era

- AIDC T-5 Brave Eagle
- Aeralis Advanced Jet Trainer
- Alenia Aermacchi M-346 Master
- Boeing-Saab T-7 Red Hawk
- Hongdu JL-10
- KAI T-50 Golden Eagle
- TAI Hürjet
- Yakovlev Yak-130
