= SNECMA Turbomeca Larzac =

French military turbofan jet engine

Larzac
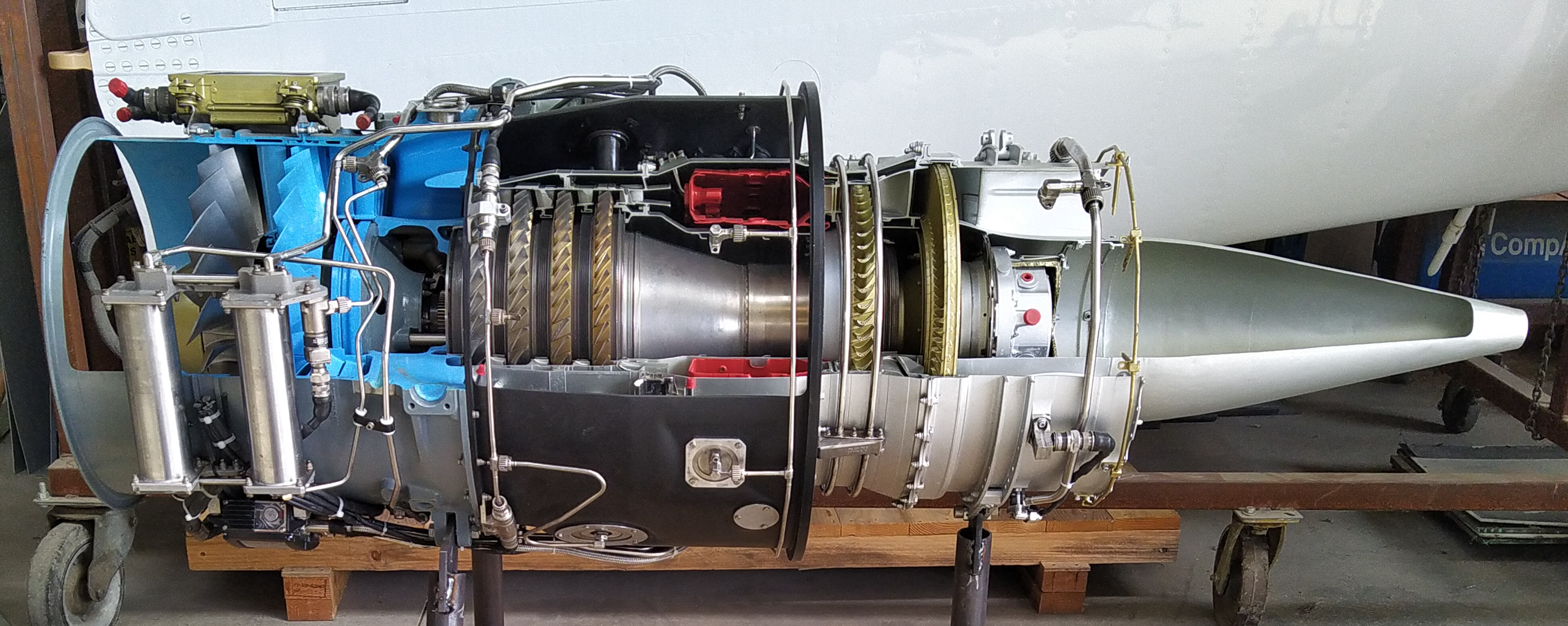
- Sectioned view of a SNECMA Turbomeca Larzac
- Type: Turbofan
- National origin: France
- Manufacturer: SNECMA Turbomeca
- Major applications: Dassault/Dornier Alpha Jet

The SNECMA Turbomeca Larzac is a military turbofan manufactured by GRTS (Groupement Turbomeca-SNECMA), a consortium between the two French companies, SNECMA and Turbomeca. Its main application was on the Dassault/Dornier Alpha Jet.

== Variants ==
49-01
04-C6
04-C20
04-H-20

== Applications ==
- Dassault/Dornier Alpha Jet
- HAL HJT-36 (only initial prototypes)

== Specifications (Larzac 04-C6) ==
Data from

==== General characteristics ====
- Type: Axial flow, twin-spool, bypass turbofan engine
- Length: 1,187 mm (46.73 in)
- Diameter: Inlet: 452 mm (17.79 in)
- Dry weight: 295 kg (650.35 lb)

==== Components ====
- Compressor: Low pressure: 2 stage axial, High pressure: 4 stage axial
- Combustors: Annular
- Turbine: Low pressure: 1 stage, High pressure: 1 stage
- Fuel type: Aviation kerosene Jet A-1 or similar
- Oil system: pressure spray/splash with scavenge

==== Performance ====
- Maximum thrust: 13 kN (2,970 lbf),
- Overall pressure ratio: 10.5
- Bypass ratio: 1.04
- Air mass flow: 28.1 kg/s (62 lb/s)
- Turbine inlet temperature: 1,403 K (1,130 °C; 2,066 °F)
- Specific fuel consumption: 73 kg/(kN hr) (0.716 lb/(lbf hr))
- Thrust-to-weight ratio: 4.567

== See also ==
Comparable engines

- Ivchenko AI-25
- Ivchenko-Progress AI-222

Related lists

- List of aircraft engines
