= HAL HJT-36 Yashas =

Indian trainer aircraft

HJT-36 Yashas
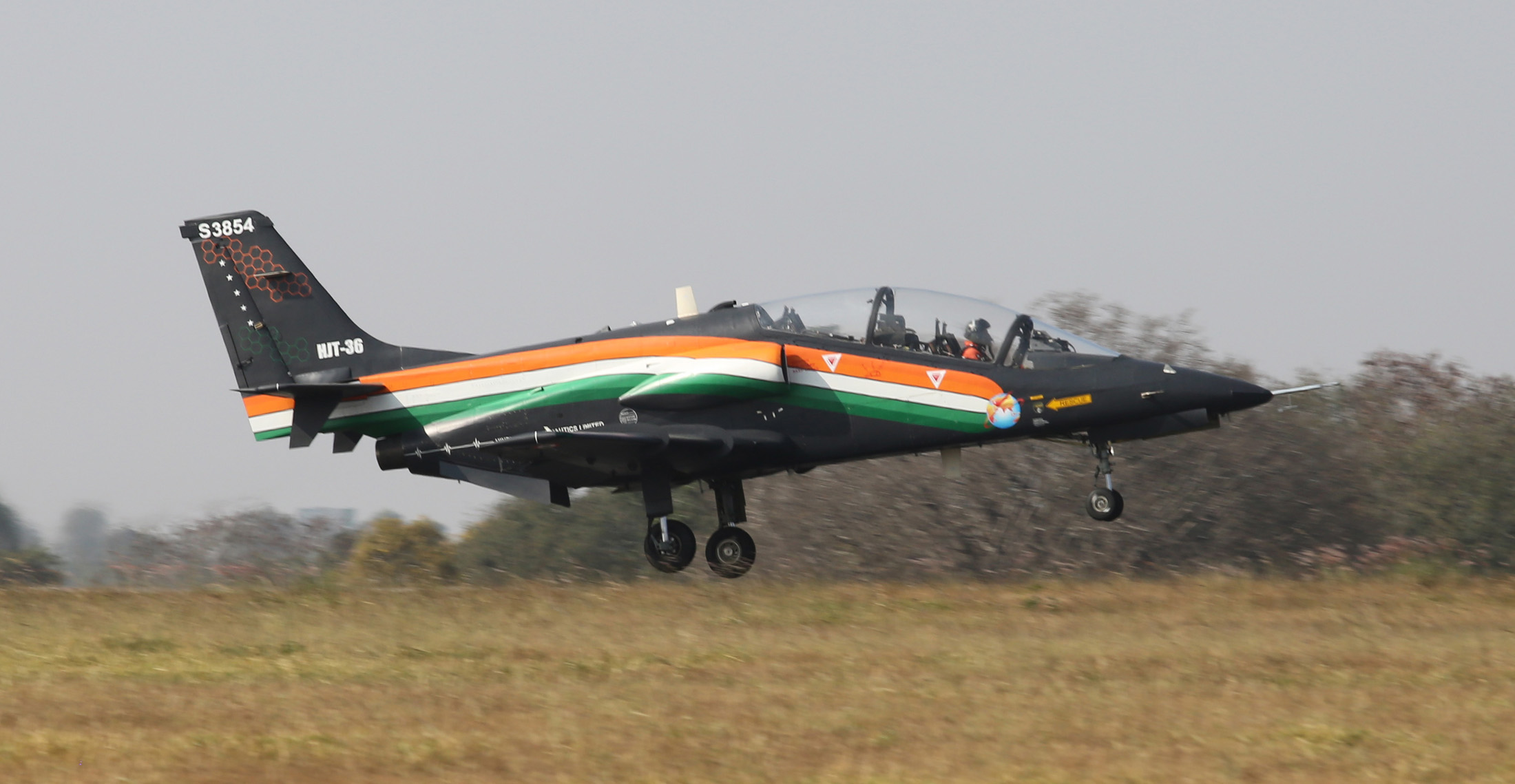
- HJT-36 Yashas at AeroIndia 2025

General information
- Type: Intermediate trainer
- National origin: India
- Manufacturer: Hindustan Aeronautics Limited
- Designer: Aircraft Research and Design Centre
- Status: Limited series production
- Primary users: Indian Air Force Indian Navy
- Number built: 16

History
- Introduction date: 2026 (Planned)
- First flight: 7 March 2003
- Developed from: HJT-16 Kiran
- Developed into: HAL HLFT-42

The HAL HJT-36 Yashas (lit. 'Glory') is a subsonic intermediate jet trainer aircraft designed and developed by Aircraft Research and Design Centre (ARDC) and built by Hindustan Aeronautics Limited (HAL) for the Indian Air Force and the Indian Navy. The HJT-36 will replace the HAL HJT-16 Kiran as the Stage-2 trainer for the two forces.

The jet, originally named Sitara, was designed as a conventional jet trainer with low swept wings, tandem cockpit and small air intakes for the engine on either side of its fuselage. It entered limited series production by 2010 but according to the Indian Air Force officials it remained "unfit" for service due to technological issues related to spin test (as of March 2017), an issue which was only solved in tests in January 2022.

In April 2019, Sitara flew for the first time in three years with a modified air frame to correct its spin characteristics.

During the opening ceremony of Aero India 2025, the HJT-36 was renamed as Yashas after undergoing significant design modifications. It is now capable of Stage II pilot training, counter insurgency and counter surface force operations, armament training, aerobatics and other roles.

== Development ==
HAL started design work on an intermediate jet trainer in 1997. The concept was developed as a successor to HAL's earlier trainer, the HJT-16 Kiran, introduced in 1968. In 1999, following reviews by the Indian Air Force, the Government of India awarded Hindustan Aeronautics a contract for the development, testing, and certification of two prototype IJT aircraft at the cost of ₹180 crore (equivalent to ₹773 crore or US$80 million in 2023). The completion of the contract was scheduled in July 2004.

In order to complete the design and prototyping in such tight schedules, HAL introduced highly advanced technologies including Numerical Master Geometry (NMG) to various teams for the aircraft's wind tunnel testing, aerodynamics, structural analysis, tooling among others.

=== 2000s ===
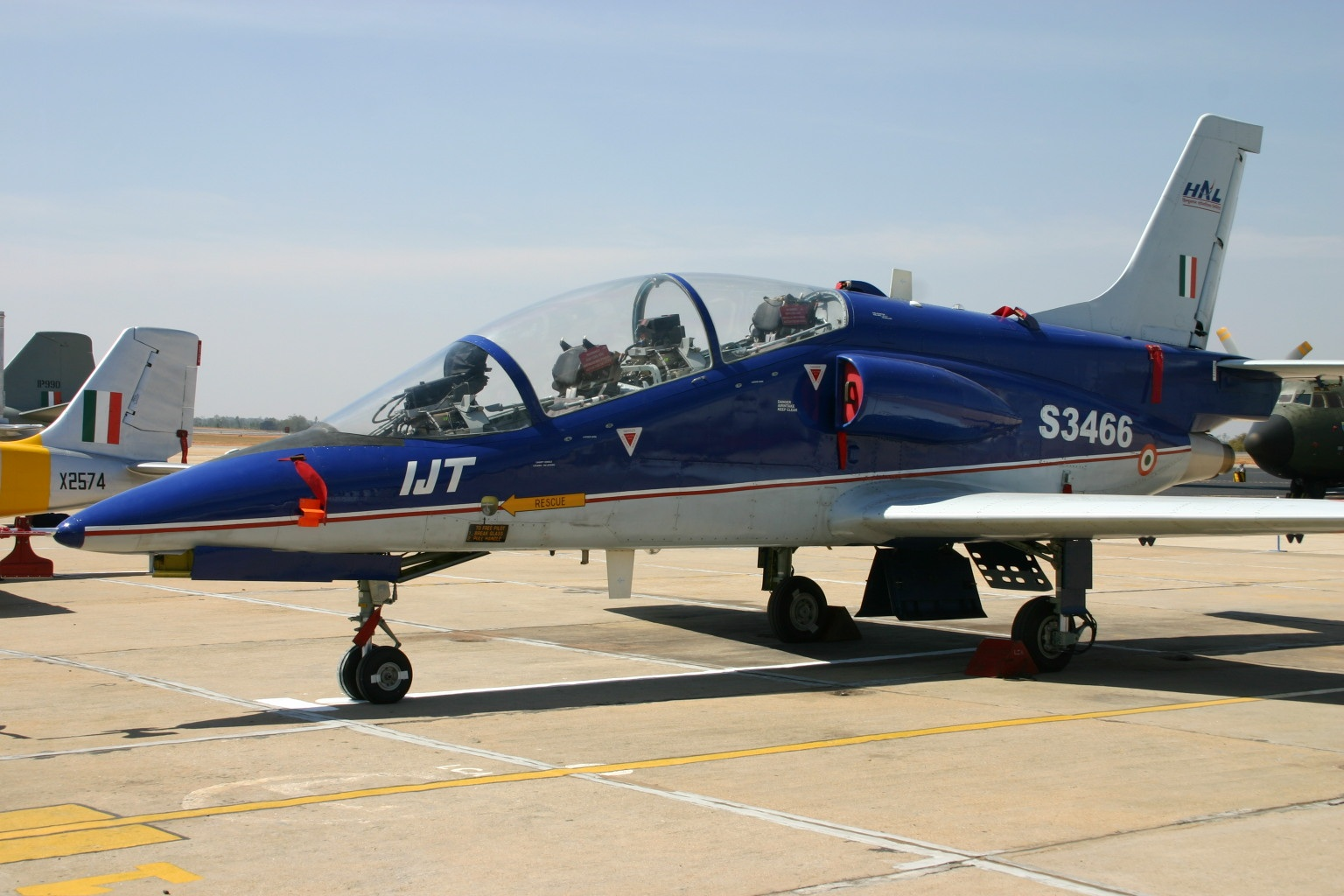
HAL HJT-36 PT-1 (S3466) Sitara at Yelahanka Air Force Station

- The first and second prototypes of the HJT-36, labeled PT-1 and PT-2, serialed S3474 and S3466, flew on 7 March 2003 and in March 2004, respectively.
- In April 2005, the project cost was revised to ₹467 crore (equivalent to ₹16 billion or US$160 million in 2023) and timeline for Initial Operational Clearance (IOC) and the Final Operational Clearance (FOC) was expected in 2006-07 and 2007-08, respectively.
- In April 2005, some delays were expected as the SNECMA Turbomeca Larzac engine was to be replaced by NPO Saturn AL-55I (16.9 kN) for higher thrust requirements.
- In February 2006, the Ministry of Defence submitted a proposal to the Cabinet Committee on Security (CCS) for procurement of 12 IJT Limited Series Production (LSP) aircraft from HAL. The clearance and the contract from the Indian Air Force was received in March 2006 at a cost of ₹486 crore (equivalent to ₹16 billion or US$160 million in 2023). Deliveries, originally scheduled between March 2008 and March 2010, was further revised to 2011-12. Later, a CAG report flagged that LSP orders are to be placed after IOC certification from CEMILAC, however, this was not followed in case of IJT project. It was then expected that the order of 73 Serial Production (SP) aircraft was to be done after conducting operations of LSP aircraft and certain required modifications to designs.
- On 8 February 2007, IJT prototype PT-1 overshot the runway at Yelehanka AFS during the inauguration of Aero India after its tyres burst during take-off.
- In November 2008, Air HQ initiated a proposal to for supply of 73 SP IJT aircraft from HAL.
- On 4 February 2009, PT-2 met with an accident just before the Aero India event due to landing gear failure while landing during a routine test flight.
- Following the crashes and delays, in March 2009, the IOC and FOC dates were shifted to 2009-10 and 2010-11, respectively.
- The first AL-55I engine was received from Russia on 28 December 2008, 2 years later than committed, and was installed on PT-1. Following ground taxiing trials, flight tests with the new engine started on 9 May 2009. However, the Russian-origin was relatively newly developed compared to the Larzac, which had 0.85 million hours of flight. This led to "teething problems" in the engines which eventually lowered the availability of the IJT prototypes and limited series production variants for test flights.

=== 2010s ===
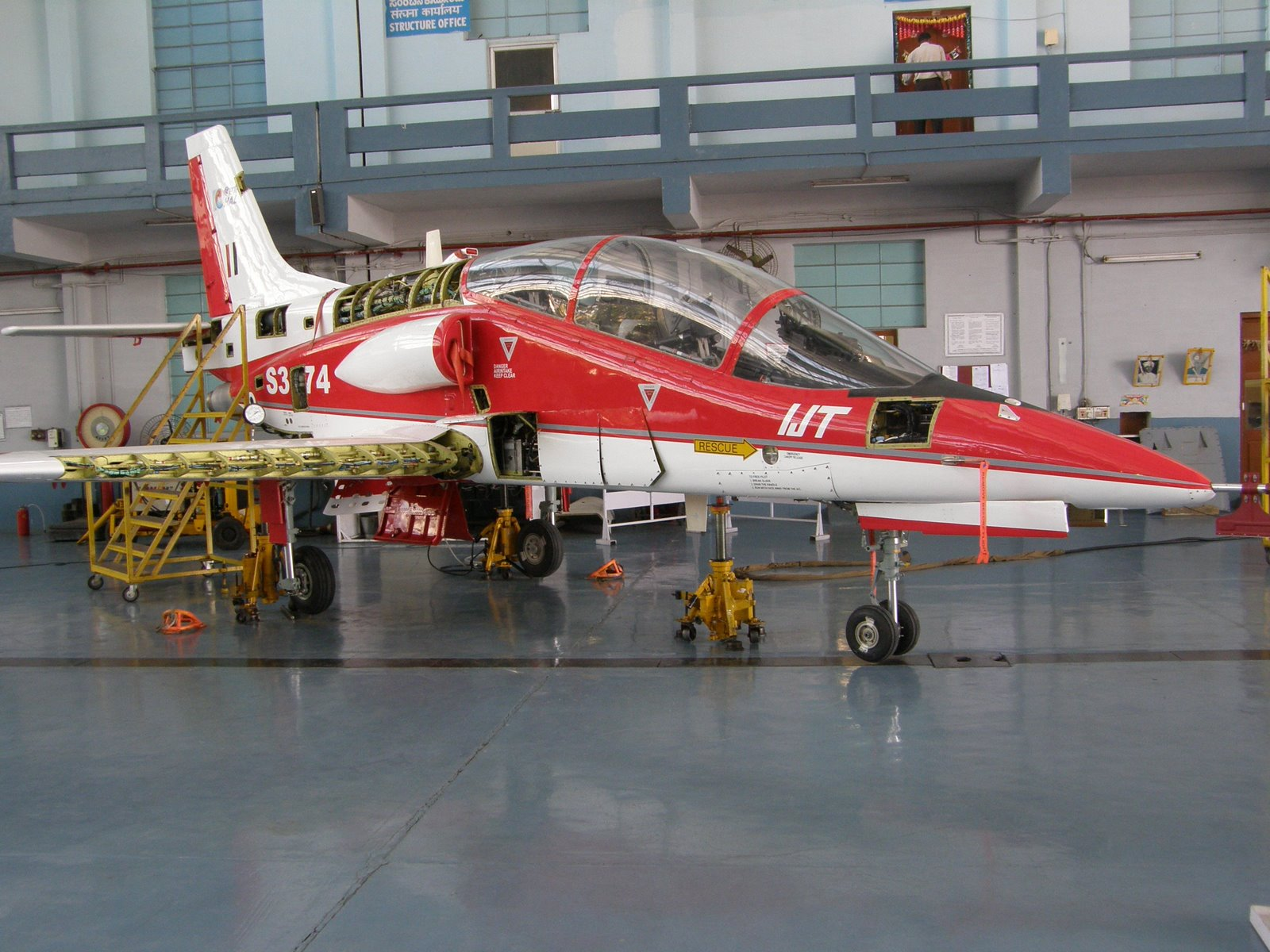
- Prototype IJT (PT-2, S3474) in its hangar at Hindustan Aeronautics Limited
  In March 2010, the Air Force placed an order for 73 HJT-36 trainers for serial production at a cost of ₹6,180 crore (equivalent to ₹140 billion or US$1.4 billion in 2023), again before the completion of IOC certification and deliveries of LSP aircraft. Clearance for the contract was approved by the CCS in February. As per MoD, the LSP aircraft order would be completed by 2011-12 and the timeline for delivery of 73 SP aircraft was between 2013 and 2017. As per delivery timeline, 6 aircraft would have to be delivered in 2013, followed by 24 aircraft in 2014 An advance payment of ₹926.15 crore (equivalent to ₹21 billion or US$220 million in 2023) was done.
- The first flight test for the limited series aircraft occurred in January 2010, and initial operational capability was expected by July 2011.
- On 28 April 2011, the first prototype (S3466) crashed in near Hosur during routine test flight in Krishnagiri district, Tamil Nadu. Both the pilots, Group Captain Anant Mathur of HAL and co-pilot Wing Commander Patra of Aircraft and Systems Testing Establishment (ASTE), ejected safely. The aircraft was lost in the accident.
- On 27 July 2012, first Engine Ground Run was performed on third prototype.
- In December 2013, HAL declared that Sitara was 'weeks' from certification.
- On 19 February 2014, the Indian MoD submitted a statement that the development of IJT was in the advanced stages of certification, with more than 800 test flights completed so far. The activities were progressing well with completion of sea level trials, night flying trials, high altitude trials as well as weapon and drop tank trials. The activities left for obtaining Final Operational Clearance (FOC) are the refinement of stall characteristics, and spin testing which will be commenced as soon as stall characteristics were refined. All efforts were being made to achieve FOC by December 2014. Production of aircraft was to commence immediately thereafter. However the stall cannot be tested until HAL redesigns the entire aircraft to correct its "inherent asymmetry".
- As of July 2014, 6 of the LSP aircraft were produced but still not delivered due to non completion of Design and Development (D&D) activities.
- BAE Systems was consulted on certain design changes, specifically the tail. Afterwards the design was put to mathematical and wind tunnel tests. The modified aircraft was expected to complete the spin tests by September 2015, and the production of 85 aircraft for the Indian Air Force to begin.
- In 2016, the programme and the testing came to a halt after the aircraft “departed from controlled flight” while testing spin characteristics. Multiple attempts to overcome these issues without a major redesign, including nose strakes, ventral fins and wing fence, had not delivered the desired outcome as wing drops were still observed as soon as the aircraft stalled. Further changes were done including the removal of nose strakes and wing fence and addition of vortex generators, which were again removed and replaced by two wing fences each side. None of these design alterations provided any improvement.
- In March 2017, Jane's reported that due to the HJT-36's "unsolvable" issues associated with critical stall and spin characteristics the aircraft is not ready to serve as an intermediate jet trainer for Indian Air Force pilots.
- With Birhle as a consultant, the air frame was modified to improve spin recovery characteristics. The modified aircraft (IJT LSP4; S3854) flew for the first time on 17 April 2019. Post modifications, a new Anti-Spin Parachute system (ASPS) was developed to ensure safety of the aircraft and test crew during spin flight testing. The wind tunnel testing facility of France-based ONERA was used to verify the design modifications. Major design changes were executed in the empennage with the vertical fins pushed back by a metre and the rudder extended beyond the vertical stabiliser until the rear fuselage, increasing the control surface area by 30%. Other control surfaces that were added as compared to the original design included nose strakes, ventral fins and a leading edge strakes at the wing root.

=== 2020s ===
- As per a report, "The new ASPS was integrated into the aircraft in July 2020 and the successful streaming of the parachutes were demonstrated in September 2020."
- In February 2021, HJT-36 took-off during Aero India with the newly supplied AL-55I engines with improved features.
- On 6 January, the IJT has successfully demonstrated the capability to carry out six turn spins to both the left and right hand sides. As of then, the aircraft would require more two years of testing, after which it would be ready for certification. With the help of internal funding, some major modifications were done in the design configuration and, hence, re-demonstration of earlier tests was required.
- In February 2025, at the Aero India 2025, HAL renamed the HJT-36 Sitara as the HJT-36 'Yashas'. The renaming was due to its design modification to correct "departure characteristics and spin resistance". The aircraft was recently integrated with "state-of-the-art avionics and an ultra-modern cockpit". This upgrades videos the overall weight of the aircraft and replaced the obsolete foreign line-replaceable units with Indian LRUs.
- On 12 February 2025, it was also reported that the Indian Air Force has not placed any order for the updated aircraft but would lease 4 to 5 'Yashas' from HAL. Further orders will be placed if the user was satisfied with its training and operational capabilities.

== Design ==
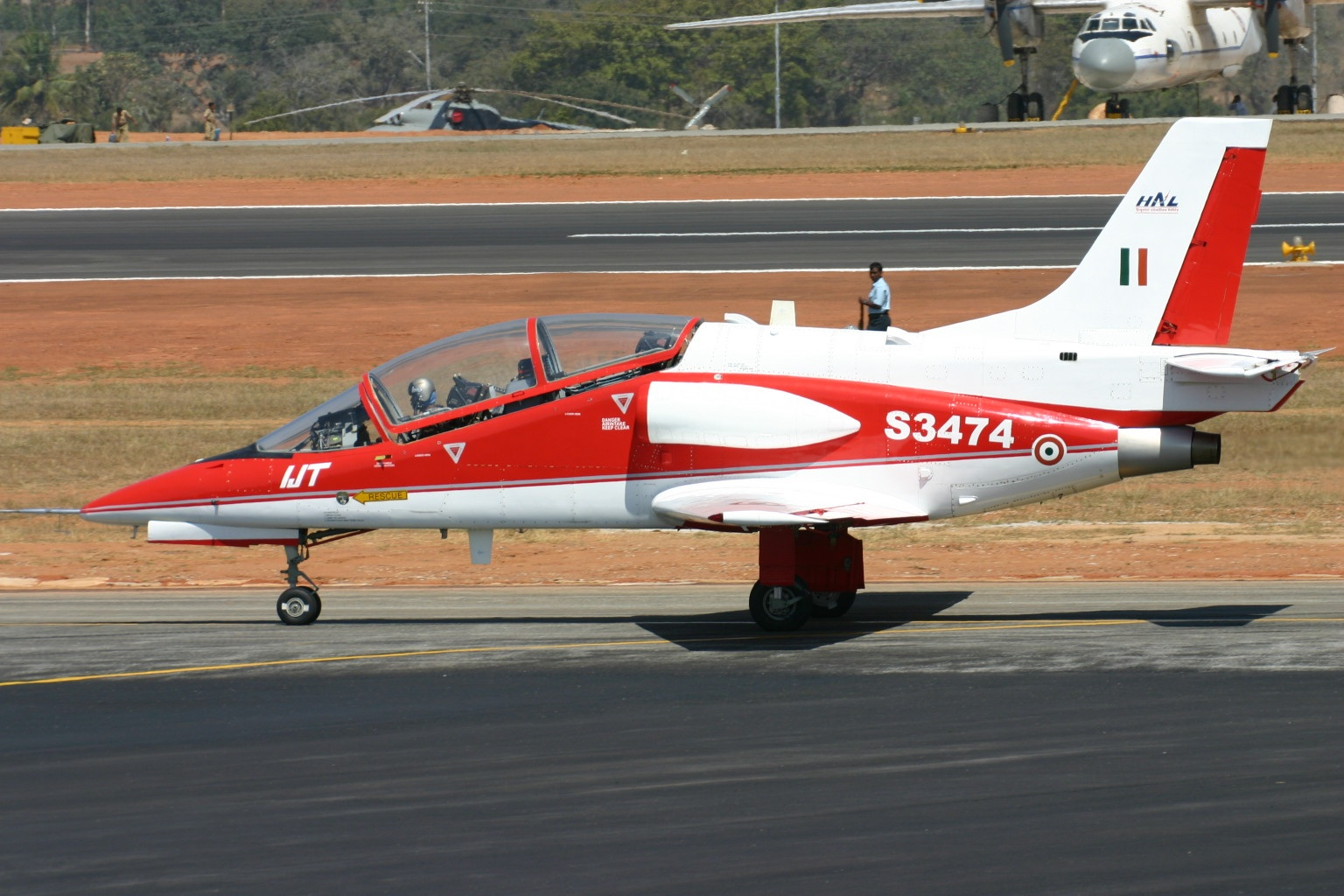
HJT-36 at Yelahanka Air Force Base in 2005

=== Airframe ===
HJT-36 uses light alloys and composites, with a conventional low wing design with 18° leading-edge sweepback and a 9.8m wingspan. It features a hydraulically retractable tricycle-type landing gear. The single-wheeled main units retract inward and the twin nose wheel unit retracts forward. About a quarter of the aircraft's line-replaceable units are common between it and the HAL Tejas trainer variant.

=== Cockpit ===
In the cockpit, the HJT-36 has a conventional tandem two-seat configuration with the trainee pilot forward and the instructor in the raised seat to the rear. The single-piece canopy gives both pilots good, all-round vision. The prototype aircraft used Zvezda K-26LT lightweight zero-zero ejection seats. However, these may be replaced with Martin-Baker Mk.16 IN16S seats, due to a price escalation of the former. The pilots have both conventional and manual flight controls.

The trainer has a full glass cockpit with a layout similar to current generation combat aircraft. It uses an integrated digital avionics system from GE Aviation Systems. Head-up display and repeater is produced by Elbit Systems.

The cockpit has stepped seating with a drooped nose enhancing the pilots' situational awareness. The aircraft also features multi-function displays and head-up display.

=== Armaments ===
The aircraft has five external hardpoints for weapons training. There is one center-line hardpoint under the fuselage and two-weapon pylons under each wing for carrying rockets, gun pods, and bombs. The maximum external payload is 1,000 kg.

=== Propulsion ===
The aircraft features a FADEC-controlled NPO Saturn AL-55I with a thrust of 17.3 kN, providing a high thrust-to-weight ratio with optimised thrust management.

The prototype aircraft was initially powered by a SNECMA Turbomeca Larzac 04-H-20 non-afterburning turbofan developing 14.12 kN of thrust. However, as stipulated by the 2005 Air Staff Qualitative Requirements (ASQRs) from the Air Force there was a requirement of higher thrust engines.

In April 2005, the Larzac engine was to be replaced by NPO Saturn AL-55I (16.9 kN) to meet training requirements. The AL-55I engine would be a Joint Venture of HAL and NPO Saturn and the deal for the development of the same was signed with Rosoboronexport in August. A funding of ₹159 crore (equivalent to ₹540 crore or US$56 million in 2023) by the Indian Ministry of Defence was released for the higher thrust engine development.

As per a CAG report on IJT, in February 2014, the engine developed (AL-55I) had a Total Technical Life (TTL) of only 300 hours against the required 3600 hours provided in the ASQR. However, by 2013, it was told that the contract for engine development was fulfilled and the JV intended to increase the TTL to 600 hours though IAF insisted a TTL of 1,200 hours. The increase of TTL was important as ASQR projected a "utilisation rate" of 30 hrs/month per aircraft which meant the engines needed to be replaced every 10 months.

On 14 July 2021, it was reported that the United Engine Corporation had deliver two units of AL-55I engines to HAL for the HJT-36 programme. The life cycle of the improved engines were increased to 1,200 hours . Earlier, 16 engines had been supplied to HAL for the prototypes and limited series production (LSP) aircraft. The engines were reportedly ready for licensed production in India. The new engines also had an improved thrust of 17.27 kN and also featured a reduction of over 50 kg weight.

By February 2025, UEC supplied 18 AL-55I engines to HAL for the project. The engines will undergo type certification followed by start of licensed production of the engines by HAL in India.

== Operators ==
India

- Indian Air Force: 12 LSP and 73 series production aircraft on order. 200-250 planned.

== Specifications (HJT-36, prototypes) ==
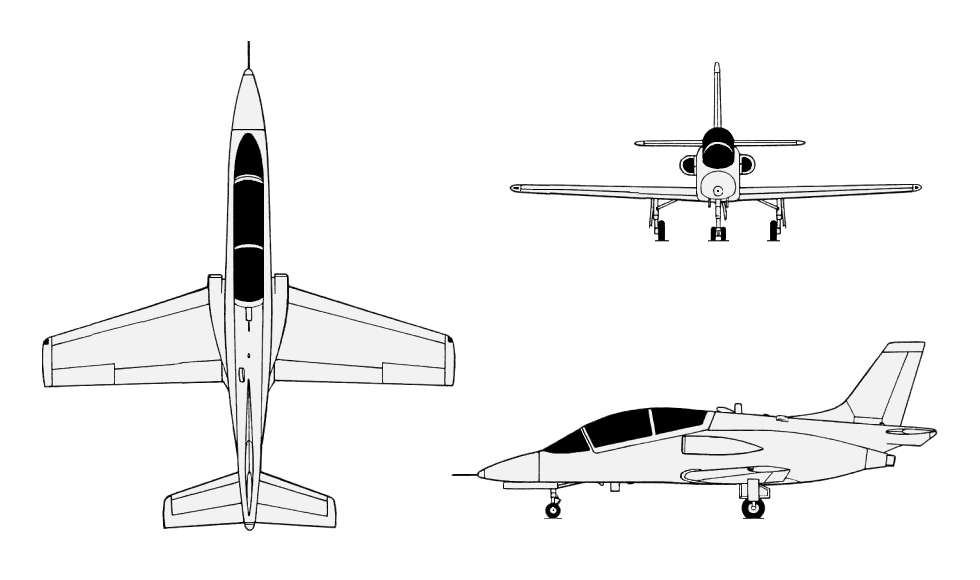

Data from Jane's All the World's Aircraft

General characteristics

- Crew: 2
- Length: 11 m (36 ft 1 in)
- Wingspan: 10 m (32 ft 9.75 in)
- Height: 4.4 m (14 ft 5.25 in)
- Wing area: 17.5 m^{2} (188.4 sq ft)
- Aspect ratio: 5.5
- Gross weight: 4,250 kg (9,370 lb)
- Max takeoff weight: 5,400 kg (11,905 lb)
- Fuel capacity: 917 kilograms (2,022 lb)
- Powerplant: 1 × SNECMA Larzac 04-H20 non-afterburning turbofan, 14.12 kN (3,175 lbf) thrust (Prototypes; replaced)
- Powerplant: 1 × NPO Saturn AL-55I non-afterburning turbofan, 17.3 kN (3,900 lbf) thrust (Production)

Performance

- Maximum speed: 750 km/h (466 mph, 405 kn)
- Maximum speed: Mach 0.75
- Range: 1,000 km (621 mi, 540 nmi)
- Service ceiling: 9,000 m (29,520 ft)
- g limits: +7.0/–2.5
- Wing loading: 308.6 kg/m^{2} (63.21 lb/sq ft)

Armament

- Hardpoints: 1 × under-fuselage and 4 × under-wing pylons with a capacity of 1,000 kilograms (2,200 lb)

== See also ==
Related development

- HAL HLFT-42
- HAL Tejas
- HJT-16
- HAL HJT 39 / CAT

Aircraft of comparable role, configuration, and era

- Aermacchi M-345
- Hongdu JL-8
- FMA IA-63 Pampa
- Kawasaki T-4
- KB SAT SR-10
