= Netra AEW&C =

Airborne early warning and control aircraft

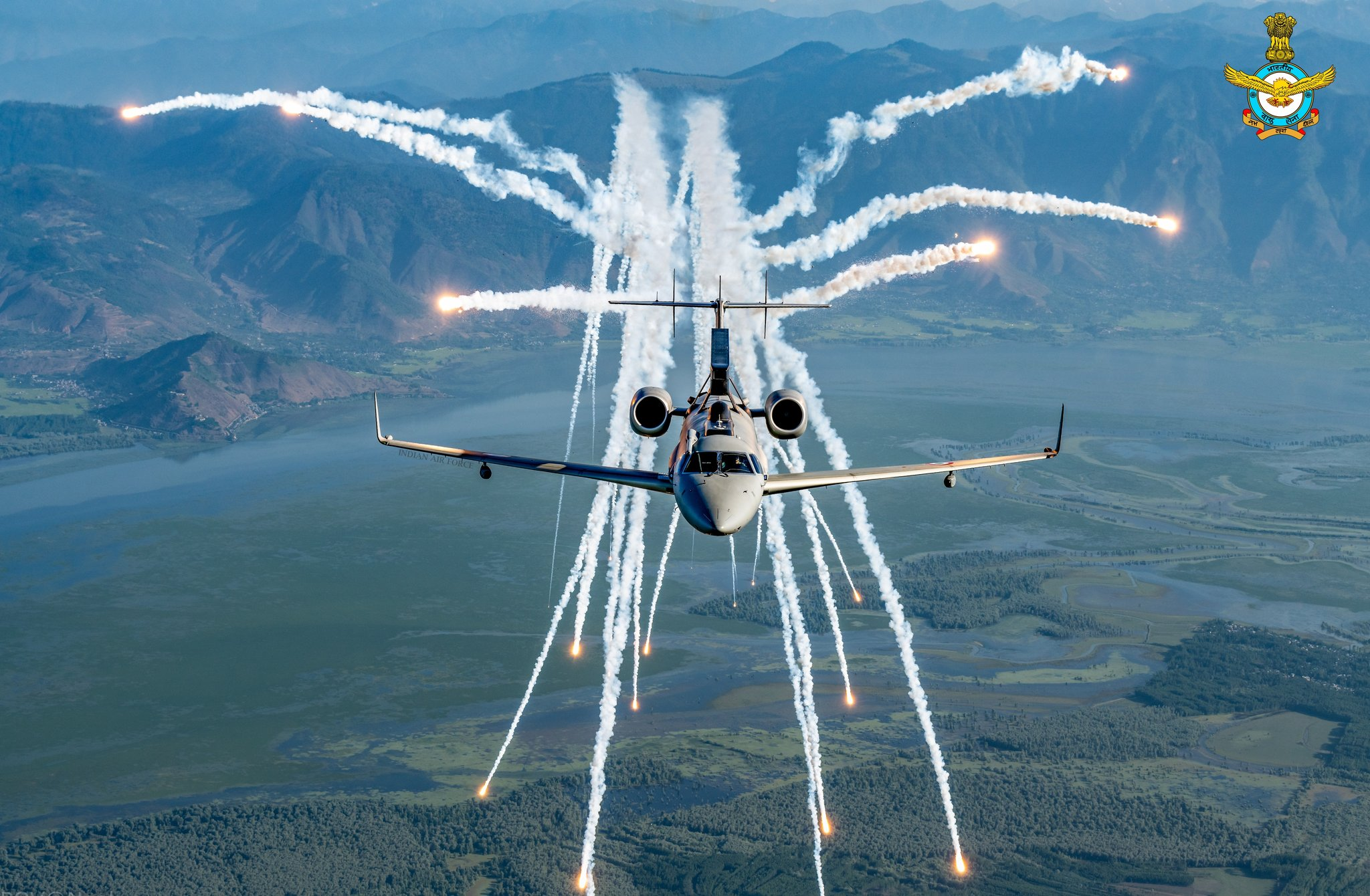
- A Netra AEW&C in flight, deploying flares

General information
- Type: Airborne early warning and control; Surveillance, Tracking, Identification & Classification of Airborne and Sea surface targets, Ballistic Missile detection
- National origin: India
- Designer: Defence Research and Development Organisation; National Aerospace Laboratories
- Status: In service
- Primary user: Indian Air Force
- Number built: Mk 1: 3 on Embraer EMB-145I

History
- Manufactured: 2011-present
- Introduction date: 14 February 2017

The Netra AEW&C system is an Indian airborne early warning and control (AEW&C) aircraft developed indigenously by the Defence Research and Development Organisation (DRDO) for the Indian Air Force. The aircraft is based on the Embraer EMB-145I airframe.

== Development ==
In 2003, the Indian Air Force (IAF) and DRDO carried out a joint study of the system-level requirements and feasibility of development for an Airborne Early Warning and Control (AEW&C) system. The Government then approved the project for the development of the AEW&C system by DRDO. Primary responsibility for the project was with Centre for Airborne Systems (CABS), which led the design, system integration and testing of the system. Electronics and Radar Development Establishment (LRDE) was responsible for the design of the radar array. The Defence Electronics Application Laboratory (DEAL), based in Dehradun, was responsible for the Data Link and Communication Systems for AEW&C system.

The DRDO AEW&CS programme, worth ₹1,800 crore (equivalent to ₹55 billion or US$570 million in 2026), aims to deliver three radar-equipped surveillance aircraft to the Indian Air Force. The aircraft platform selected was the Embraer EMB-145I. As per a contract signed in 2008, Three EMB-145I were procured from Embraer at a cost of US$210 Million, including the contracted modifications to the airframe including features like in-flight refueling system, SATCOM capability, increased electrical and cooling capacities, and multiple aerodynamic and structural changes. The project goal was to deploy these AEW&C aircraft by 2013. India's sole previous effort to develop an AEW&C system was the Airborne Surveillance Platform, but the programme, codenamed Airavat, was ended after the only test-bed crashed. The AEW&C project aimed to supplement the larger and more capable EL/W-2090 AWACS acquired by the IAF from Israel. Three EL/W-2090 systems have been ordered, with follow-on orders of 3 more expected in 2010. Apart from providing the IAF with a cheaper and hence, more flexible AEW&C platform as a backup to its more capable EL/W-2090 class systems, the DRDO AEW&C project aimed to develop the domestic ability to design and operationalise airborne surveillance platforms.

The first round of modifications to the first EMB-145I fuselage for India's early warning aircraft were made in March 2011 in preparation for integration with the Indian-designed antenna.

In June 2010, it was reported that the Active Array Antenna Unit (AAAU), developed by DRDO's Centre for Airborne Systems (CABS), was to be integrated into the modified EMB-145I aircraft. First test flight of the system was expected in early 2011.

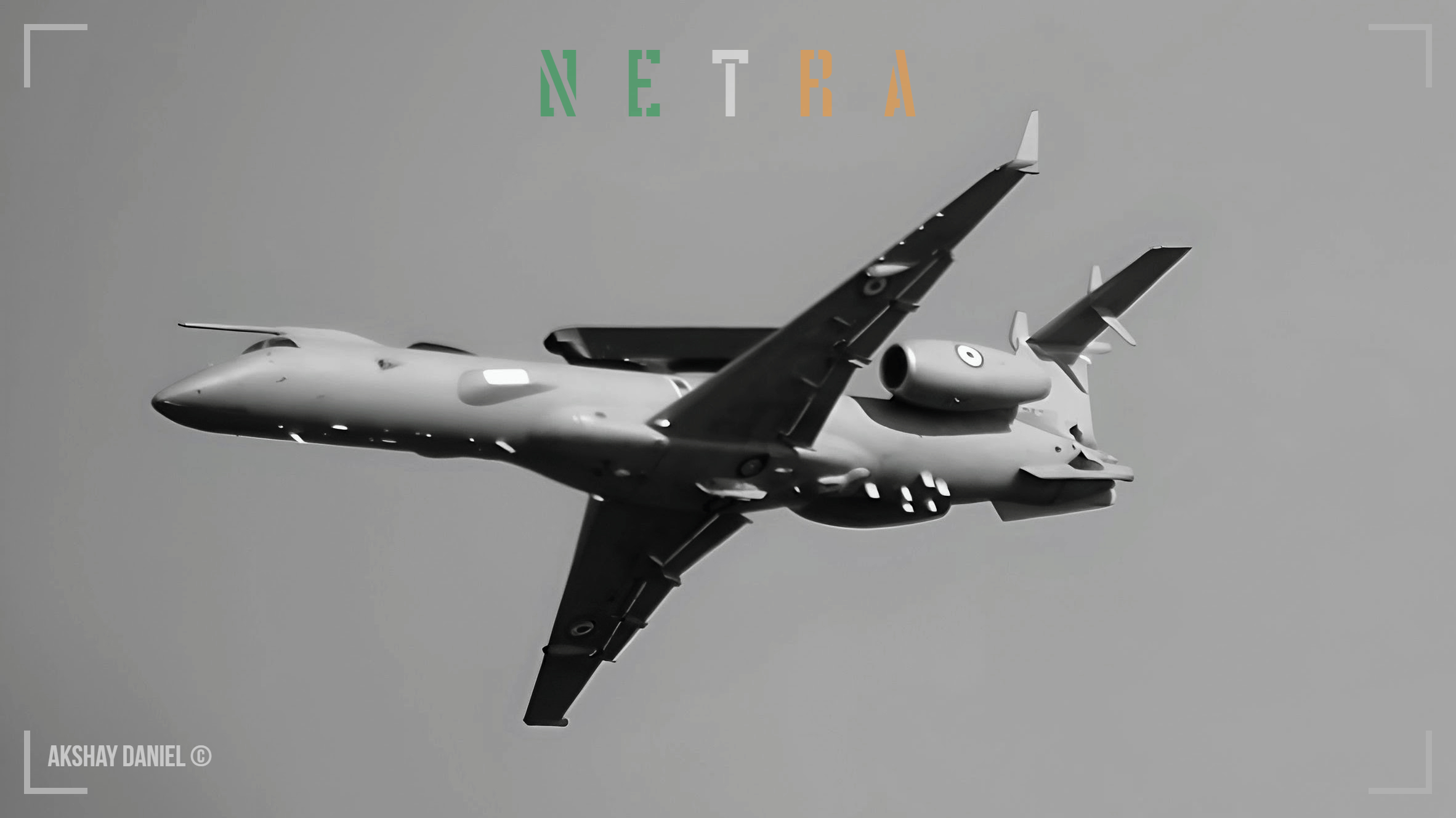
DRDO AEW&CS

The first modified fuselage platform was handed over to DRDO by Embraer in February 2011. Ground and flight tests of the aircraft were to be followed by installation of radar and other equipment. The first fully modified EMEMB-145 aircraft with the antenna and its electronic payload made its maiden flight on 6 December 2011 at Embraer facilities at Sao Jose dos Campos in Brazil with about 1000 Mission System Components provided by CABS, DRDO. These included the critical item – AESA (Active Electronically Scanned Array) Radar Antenna developed by DRDO and certified from ANAC, International FAR Certification Agency at Sao Jose dos Campos in Brazil. Some of the sensitive advanced systems were replaced with dummy equipment of equivalent size and weight. These were to be integrated later in India following flight certification. A two-year certification period is expected. DRDO is expected to receive the next two aircraft platforms to start integration by mid-2012.

Maiden flight of the second fully modified aircraft for the Indian Airborne Early Warning and Control (AEW&C) system was held at 1930 IST on 4 April 2012 at the San Jose dos Campos in Brazil. The necessary mission systems and components including the dummy AAAU (Active Antenna Array Unit) are successfully fitted onboard Embraer EMB-145I aircraft.

As reported in March 2015, the completion timeline of the project was shifted to December 2015 after multiple delays.

By 2017, the project cost for 3 aircraft was revised to ₹2,425 crore (equivalent to ₹37 billion or US$390 million in 2026).

=== Workshare ===
The responsibility between various DRDO laboratories is split as follows:

1. Electronics and Radar Development Establishment (LRDE) – Primary radar
2. Defence Electronics Application Laboratory (DEAL) – Communication Systems and Data Link
3. Defence Avionics Research Establishment (DARE) – Self Protection suite, Electronic Support Measurement EW
4. Defence Electronics Research Laboratory (DLRL) – Communication Support Measures
5. Centre for Airborne Systems (CABS) – IFF & Overall Programme Management, integration and development of the data handling system, displays, mission computers et al.

Various Indian private sector firms are involved in the programme. National Aerospace Laboratories (NAL) of Council of Scientific and Industrial Research (CSIR) contributed to the aerodynamic studies of the antenna array, and flight modelling of the entire AEW&C system platform.

== Further development ==
=== Netra Mk 1A (EMB-145I) ===
As of 6 February 2024, sources reporting to various media and newspapers said that the Defence Acquisition Council of the Ministry of Defence will take up the acceptance of necessity for the six Mark-1A aircraft next week, which will entail mounting active electronically scanned array antenna-based radars, electronic and signal intelligence systems on Brazilian Embraer jets, at a cost of around ₹9,000 crore (equivalent to ₹96 billion or US$1.0 billion in 2026). These six AEW&C aircraft will be based on Embraer EMB-145I and have 240° radar coverage. But there will be better software and more advanced technologies like new gallium nitride-based TR (transmit/receive) modules for the radars. This variant will also inherit some of the technologies from Mark 2. DRDO will purchase the aircraft from Embraer and all the modifications will be carried out by the Centre for Air Borne Systems in India. The Defence Acquisition Council is to clear the acquisition soon as of October 2024.

Since the EMB-145I platform is no longer manufactured, DRDO and IAF are scouting their availability in secondary markets, while Embraer has also offered Praetor 600 aircraft for the same role.

The Defence Acquisition Council finally cleared the acceptance of necessity (AoN) for the AEW&C project on 20 March 2025. Reportedly, the Air Force plans to replace the existing Netra AEW&C by upgraded variants. The Defence Acquisition Council is also expected to clear the procurement of the six aircraft from Embraer of Brazil in the last week of June 2025. The acquisition was approved during the meeting on 29 December 2025. The defence ministry will now release a request for proposal to purchase six Embraer jets. The radar, with a 270° coverage, will be equipped with a better electronic warfare suite and network-centric warfare capabilities.

In August 2026, it was reported that Embraer had identified six airframes for the Mk1A, with a deal expected to be signed by the end of 2026.

=== Netra Mk 2 (Airbus A321) ===
The Defence Acquisition Council (DAC) in September 2021 cleared the acceptance of necessity for the ₹11,000 crore (US$1.49 billion) AEW&CS project for six aircraft. The platform would be Airbus A321 purchased from Air India. The platforms would be sent to France, modified to military standards, and then will be returned to DRDO where radars and surveillance suites would be fitted. The contract negotiations for the modifications of the aircraft was on the way as of October 2024.

The developmental work on the six Mark 2 aircraft, with bigger and more capable versions of the AEW&C radars and sensors to be mounted on the A321 platforms was already at an advanced stage, as of February 2024, at a cost of ₹10,990 crore (equivalent to ₹120 billion or US$1.2 billion in 2026). The delivery of the first such AEW&C Mark-2 aircraft, which will also have an antenna in the nose in addition to the main dorsal antenna to give 300-degree radar coverage, would take place in 2026–27. The Adani Defence Systems & Technologies Limited (ADSTL) has been designated as the L1 entity for becoming the Development cum Production Partner (DcPP) for this project.

The Cabinet Committee on Security approved the project, worth ₹19,000 crore (equivalent to ₹200 billion or US$2.0 billion in 2026), on 17 July 2025. It is anticipated that the project will be completed in three years starting in 2025. For the refit, DRDO will collaborate with Airbus Defence and Space in Spain, to modify and upgrade the jet platforms as per military standards, along with several Indian firms to equip the Netra Mk 2 with a mission control system and an indigenous AESA radar atop a dorsal fin-mounted antenna which will reportedly provide 300–360° coverage. The project has been officially designated AWACS (India). All the six aircraft are expected to be delivered by 2033–34. The cost of the project inflated by ₹7,000 crore (equivalent to ₹72 billion or US$750 million in 2026) after additional modifications to the aircraft was identified.

On 22 July 2026, the Centre for Airborne Systems (CABS) of DRDO signed two important contracts with the industry to enable the development and production of the AEW&C Mk II project. The first contract was signed with AI Engineering Services Limited (AIESL), New Delhi, under which the A321 airframes will be converted from commercial or airliner to green configuration. The DcPP contract with the ADSTL, Ahmedabad, was also signed on the same day. CABS along with ADSTL will be responsible for the integration of the mission systems on the modified A321 platforms delivered by the Airbus Defence & Space. Thereafter, CABS and ADSTL will conduct flight trials of the system to receive certification from the CEMILAC and the Directorate General of Aeronautical Quality Assurance (DG AQA).

=== 360° azimuth variant ===
On 29 March 2015, the Defence Acquisition Council approved the development of two AEW&C. The radar, mounted on an Airbus A330 airfame, would have a range of 400 km with 360° azimuth. The project, referred to as AWACS-India, would cost ₹5,113 crore (equivalent to ₹84 billion or US$870 million in 2026). This woud be followed by an additional order of six units of the same design while the project is midway. Once the contract is signed, eighty months (6-7 years) will be required for the delivery of first aircraft. Airbus was the only contender to provide airframe for the design and development while A330 will undergo some structural and electrical changes for the project. For this project, the funding will be divided in 80:20 ratio between IAF and DRDO.

As of February 2017, the deal was not signed while the cost of six additional AWACS would be ₹20,000 crore (equivalent to ₹310 billion or US$3.2 billion in 2026). The cost negotiations for the first contract would begin after the latter is cleared.

The mission systems, including the 10 metre radar dome, would weigh 20 tonnes.

On 19 July 2024, IAF issued an RFI to procure six AEW&C systems and their respective ground support elements. The elements of the aircraft system would include a primary radar, Electronic Surveillance Measures (ESM), Communication Support Measures (CSM), command & control (C2), battle management system and networking through data links, IFF and self-protection electronic warfare suite. The primary radar is slated to have a 360° azimuth. The jet engine aircraft is to have eight-hour endurance with aerial refueling capabilities, cruise altitude of over 40,000 ft (12,000 m), cruise speed of above Mach 0.7 and a range of flying altitude from 500 ft (150 m) to 65,000 ft (20,000 m). It should be able to track large bodied aircraft to slow unmanned aerial vehicles having a low radar cross section at ranges above 550 km (340 mi). Vendors may either offer aircraft already customised as an AEW&C system or any aircraft meeting the requirements laid out by IAF including a pre-owned aircraft.

On 5 January 2026, IAF issued another RFI to procure six AEW&C systems with their associated ground equipment. The systems are meant to provide long-range radar detection with instruments requirements similar to those laid out in the 2024 RFI. However, the aircraft specifications were upgraded to ten-hour endurance or aerial refueling capabilities with a service ceiling of 45,000 ft (14,000 m) and capable of operating from airfields located at an altitude of 10,000 ft (3,000 m). The advanced mission suite is expected to include a 360° azimuth radar capable of detecting small, slow-moving targets as well as hypersonic weapons.

== Variants (specifications) ==
Designation	Detection range	Instrumented range	Radar coverage	Platform	Notable features	Status	Ref.
Netra Mk 1	250–375+ km (depends on RCS)	450–500 km	240°	Embraer EMB-145I	Identification of friend or foe (IFF), satellite datalinks, missile‑warning receivers and air‑to‑air refueling for extended missions.	3 in service	
Netra Mk 1A	450 km	N/A	240–270°	Embraer ERJ family	Enhanced mission suite, upgraded sensors, better human‑machine interface and tighter integration into IAF systems.; Better detection of low‑observability aircraft like drones and stealth jets	6 planned	
Netra Mk 2	500+ km	N/A	300°	Airbus A321 (ex Air India)	Improved all‑round situational awareness, including drone and low‑RCS aerial threats	6 cleared	

== Design ==
=== Netra Mark 1 ===
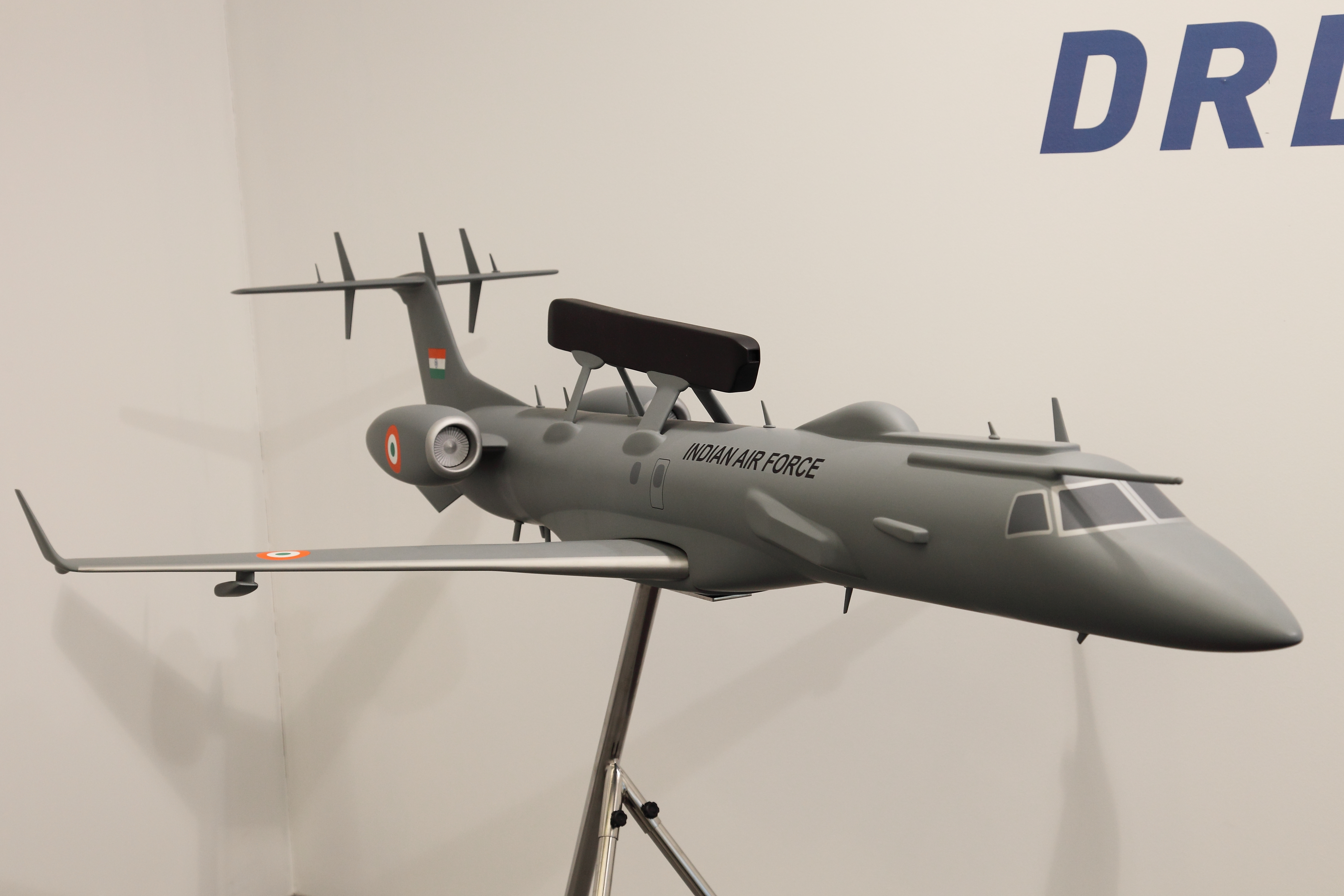
A model of the Netra AEW&C system exhibited at the ILA Berlin Air Show 2012

Two radiating planar arrays assembled back-to-back and mounted on top of the fuselage in an active antenna array unit (AAAU) will provide 240° coverage like Erieye. The AAAU is configured to compactly house 10 × 2 antenna array panels, 160 transmit receive 10 × 2 antenna array panels, 160 transmit receive multi-modules (TRMMs) dividers, beam forming units, beam control units, power supply units and related electronic devices including cables and connectors. This has been achieved through an innovative and iterative process to arrive at the AAAU with minimal dimensions and optimum mass properties. A unique feature of this Indian TRMM design is that eight trans-receive modules are combined compactly to form a single TRMM, thus facilitating high density installation of 160 of them in the AAAU to power the surveillance radar.

Additionally, the aircraft has other mission capabilities like identification friend or foe (IFF), electronic and communication support measures, C-band line-of-sight and Ku-band SATCOM datalinks, etc., similar to those on the AWACS and CAEW systems. The important modes of operation of the primary radar system are the surface surveillance and the air surveillance. The sensor has the abilities to search, track-while-scan, priority tracking, high performance tracking, etc. In priority tracking, the targets will be placed in full track mode even if these cross the primary surveillance area. In high performance tracking, additional measurements will be made to improve the tracking accuracy. Utilising active aperture technology, the radar provides a fast-beam agile system that can operate in several modes concurrently. Inter-operability with AWACS, other AEW&C aircraft, fighters and ground-exploitation stations is ensured using the data-links with voice and data channels. The aircraft cabin houses five operator work stations to adequately meet requirements of the operational mission tasks.

An air-to-air refuelling system enables extended operations at times of need. The endurance of the platform aircraft is about nine hours with one air-to-air refuelling. The system will have 5-crew operator configuration with an arrangement of up to 7 crew resting at any given time.

== Capabilities ==
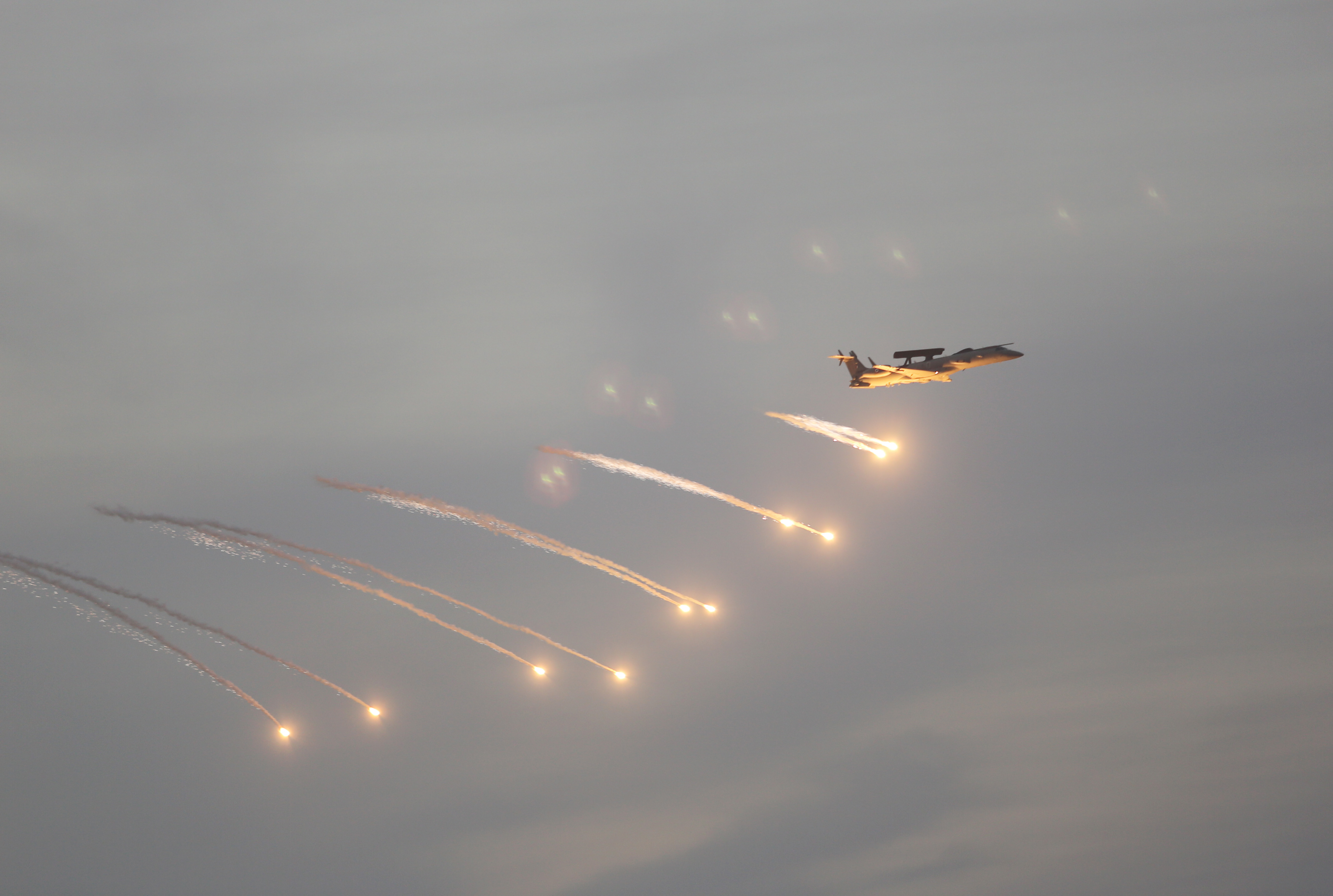
DRDO AEW&CS at Exercise Vayu Shakti 2019

The AEW&C system has an active electronically scanned array (AESA) primary radar with IFF. The system will also have ESM (Electronic Support Measures) and CSM (Communications Support Measures) ability. Datalinks to network the AEW&C with fighters, and ground-based control systems will also be provided, as will be the SATCOM (Satellite Communication System). The aircraft will also have a comprehensive self-defence suite. The avionics suite will be linked via a data handling system, controlled by mission computers.

DRDO's public overview of the AEW&C system stated:

- The Radar will have an extended range mode against fighter aircraft, and will consist of two back to back AESA arrays, with an additional dedicated IFF array.
- The ESM system will be able to track sources with a directional accuracy of 2 deg. RMS and a frequency accuracy of 1 MHz.
- The ESM system will have complete 360-degree coverage in azimuth and have a database of up to 3000 emitters against which threats will be scanned.
- Communication Support Measure system will analyse and record intercepted communications both inflight and post flight.
- Self Protection Suite will have a passive Missile Approach Warning System, a Radar Warning Receiver and countermeasures dispensers. The SPS will be integrated with the ESM and CSM suite.
- The aircraft will support Inflight refuelling.
- The aircraft will have SATCOM, and datalinks to pass on ESM, CSM and radar data to ground stations and datalinks to pass on target information to fighters. More than 40 other aircraft will be data linked together by the AEW&C aircraft.

== Delivery ==
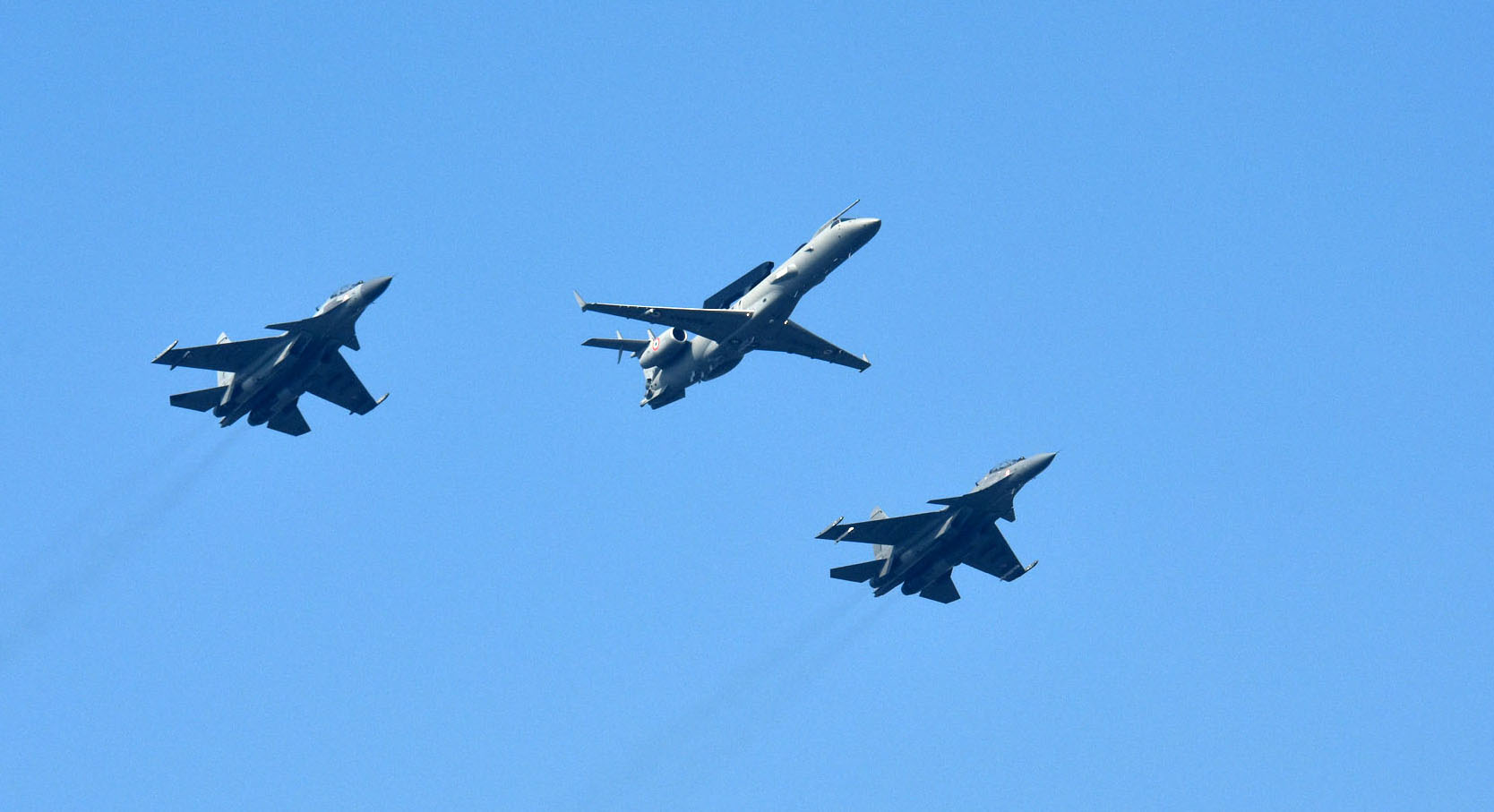
A Netra AEW&C flying in formation with two Sukhoi Su-30MKIs of IAF

The Embraer Defence and Security, on 16 August 2012, delivered the first EMB-145I Airborne Early Warning and Control (AEW&C) class of aircraft to the Government of India, in a ceremony held at Embraer's headquarters in São José dos Campos, Brazil. The delivery follows successful completion of ground and flight tests of the aircraft which met operational targets established by both Embraer and Centre for Airborne Systems (CABS) of Defence Research & Development Organisation (DRDO). Later on the aircraft will be delivered to the Indian Air Force after integration of missions systems of DRDO by CABS in India.

The first fully modified aircraft for India's Airborne Early Warning and Control System landed on Indian soil at Centre for Airborne Systems (CABS) Bangalore, a DRDO laboratory at 22:10 hours at HAL airport, Wednesday night at 22 August 2012. The acceptance of the aircraft was completed over a period of 15 days at Embraer Facilities in Brazil, by a joint team from CABS, Centre for Military Airworthiness and Certification (CEMILAC), Directorate General of Aeronautical Quality Assurance (DGAQA) and Indian Air Force (IAF).

The aircraft ferried with several mission system external components of DRDO including the (AESA radar) Active Electronically scanned Array Antenna with passive electronics fitted on the aircraft. The arrival of this aircraft marks the beginning of another phase of journey leading to the next major milestone of integration of the DRDO developed mission system, which will be followed by development flight trials in India beginning of 2013. It may be noted that this is the first aircraft delivered by M/s Embraer for which the contract was signed in 2008. The next aircraft is expected to arrive in December 2012.

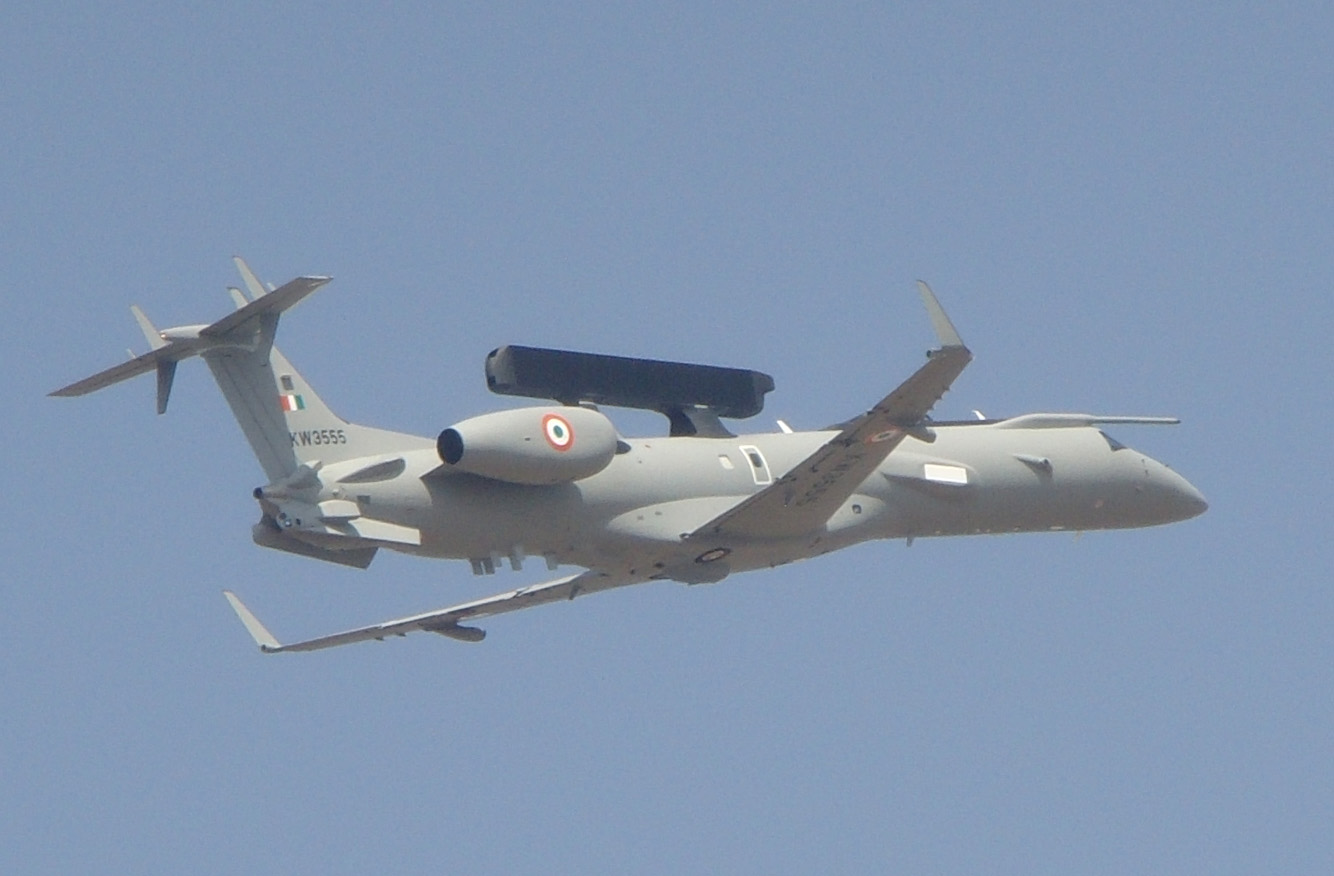
Netra AEW&C in Aero India 2017

On 14 February 2017, the first aircraft was delivered to the Indian Air Force at the Aero India event in the presence of the then Indian defence minister, Manohar Parrikar. By October 2017, it received initial operational clearance (IOC) and was undergoing operational test runs at Bathinda Air Force Station. As for others, the second aircraft was awaiting final operational clearance will be arrange while the third would be retained by DRDO for R&D work.

IAF took delivery of the second Netra AEW&C on 11 September 2019 and deployed it at Bathinda Air Base in Punjab. The third Embraer platform was meant to remain with DRDO but now they are looking at the option of selling the aircraft to a foreign customer as a major diplomatic gesture.

The third NETRA AEW&C completed flight trials and acceptance trials in 2023 after integrating with all mission systems in initial operational clearance configuration, including SDRs, and an indigenous ESM/RWR. As of 2023-24, it has been delivered to IAF by the DRDO in the identical configuration as the two AEW&Cs before it.

By January 2025, three aircraft have been delivered in IOC configuration and the final operational clearance (FOC) is in advanced stage.

In January 2026, it was reported that the AEW&CS received FOC clearance. This implies the system meeting all the Air Staff Qualitative Requirements (ASQR) set for the programme and is combat mission-ready for high-intensity conflicts. On 25 June, DRDO transferred the FOC certificate for the Netra AEW&C system to the Indian Air Force during a formal ceremony presided over by the Deputy Chief of the Air Staff, Air Marshal Awadhesh Kumar Bharti, in Bengaluru.

== Operational history ==
The first combat usage of the Netra AEW&C by the IAF was on 26 February 2019, during the Balakot airstrike. Indonesia has requested a systems demonstration.

On 25 June 2026, the final operational clearance (FOC) certificate of the AEW&C was officially handed over to the from the Air Force.

== Operators ==
India

- Indian Air Force : 3 in service
  - Bhisiana Air Force Station, Bathinda, Punjab
    - No. 200 Squadron

== See also ==
=== Related aircraft ===
- Embraer ERJ 145 family
- Embraer R-99
- Dassault Falcon 8X ARCHANGE
- Saab GlobalEye
- Raytheon Sentinel
- Shaanxi KJ-2000
- Gulfstream G550 CAEW Eitam
- Embraer Legacy 450/500 and Praetor 500/600
