= DRDO Netra Mk2 =

Airborne early warning and control aircraft

Netra Mark 2

General information
- Type: Airborne early warning and control
- National origin: India
- Manufacturer: Airbus Defence & Space (OEM for aircraft); Adani Defence Systems and Technologies (DcPP for mission systems)
- Designer: Centre for Airborne Systems, DRDO
- Status: Under development
- Primary user: Indian Air Force (intended)
- Number built: 6 planned

History
- Developed from: Airbus A321 (aircraft); Netra AEW&C (radar system)

The DRDO Netra Mark 2 is an upcoming Indian airborne early warning and control (AEW&C) system being developed by the Defence Research and Development Organisation for the Indian Air Force. It follows the Netra Mark 1 and Mark 1A variants, and will be mounted on Airbus A321 aircraft that have been acquired from Air India.

== Development ==
The Defence Acquisition Council (DAC) in September 2021 cleared the acceptance of necessity for the ₹11,000 crore (US$1.49 billion) AEW&CS project for six aircraft. The platform would be Airbus A321 purchased from Air India. The platforms would be sent to France, modified to military standards, and then will be returned to DRDO where radars and surveillance suites would be fitted. The contract negotiations for the modifications of the aircraft was on the way as of October 2024.

The developmental work on the six Mark 2 aircraft, with bigger and more capable versions of the AEW&C radars and sensors to be mounted on the A321 platforms was already at an advanced stage, as of February 2024, at a cost of ₹10,990 crore (US$1.1 billion). The delivery of the first such AEW&C Mark-2 aircraft, which will also have an antenna in the nose in addition to the main dorsal antenna to give 300-degree radar coverage, would take place in 2026–27. The Adani Defence Systems & Technologies Limited (ADSTL) has been designated as the L1 entity for becoming the Development cum Production Partner (DcPP) for this project.

The six A321 aircraft, as of March 2025, were being operated by the Air HQ Communication Squadron, Indian Air Force.

The Cabinet Committee on Security approved the project, worth ₹19,000 crore (US$2.0 billion), on 17 July 2025. It is anticipated that the project will be completed in three years starting in 2025. For the refit, DRDO will collaborate with Airbus Defence and Space in Spain, to modify and upgrade the jet platforms as per military standards, along with several Indian firms to equip the Netra Mk 2 with a mission control system and an indigenous AESA radar atop a dorsal fin-mounted antenna which will reportedly provide 300–360° coverage. The project has been officially designated AWACS (India). All the six aircraft are expected to be delivered by 2033–34. The cost of the project inflated by ₹7,000 crore (US$730 million) after additional modifications to the aircraft was identified.

The aircraft upgrade project in France was cleared by the DAC on 29 December 2025.

On 22 July 2026, the Centre for Airborne Systems (CABS) of DRDO signed two important contracts with the industry to enable the development and production of the AEW&C Mk II project. The first contract was signed with AI Engineering Services Limited (AIESL), New Delhi, under which the A321 airframes will be converted from commercial or airliner to green configuration. The DcPP contract with the ADSTL, Ahmedabad, was also signed on the same day. CABS along with ADSTL will be responsible for the integration of the mission systems on the modified A321 platforms delivered by the Airbus Defence & Space. Thereafter, CABS and ADSTL will conduct flight trials of the system to receive certification from the CEMILAC and the Directorate General of Aeronautical Quality Assurance (DG AQA).

== Design and Features ==
The Netra Mk2 will feature a dorsal fin-mounted active electronically scanned array radar, providing 300° radar coverage. In addition, a secondary antenna will be installed in the nose of the aircraft to enhance forward coverage.

Other planned features include:

- Extended detection ranges compared to the Netra MkI.
- Multi-role mission control system for airspace surveillance, battle management, and communication relay.
- Integration of advanced indigenous sensors and electronic warfare suites.
- Use of Airbus A321 as the base platform, offering larger payload capacity and endurance compared to Embraer EMB-145 used in Netra Mk1A.

== Operators ==
- Indian Air Force – Six aircraft to be procured.

== See also ==
- DRDO AEW&CS
