= Airborne Surveillance Platform =

Indian defence project

The Airborne Surveillance Platform (ASP) is an Indian defence project initiated by the Defence Research and Development Organisation (DRDO) with the aim to produce an Airborne Early Warning System. Two prototypes were developed and flight tested for three years. The project was cancelled in 1999 after the prototype aircraft crashed, killing eight scientists and the aircrew. After four years of inactivity, the project was revived in 2004 with a new platform and radar.

== Origins ==
The ASP programme, code-named "Airavat", is one of the key force multipliers in India's modern war scenario. DRDO is developing an advanced surveillance platform based on a Hawker Siddeley HS 748 aircraft to detect targets at extended ranges with all-around azimuth coverage. It is designed to handle 50 targets and features a hybrid navigation system, including both satellite and ground (beacon) based topography. The communication and data links are dual redundant secure systems.

The origin of the programme possibly lies in the aftermath of the 1971 India-Pakistan war. As revealed by air operations on the western front, timely information retrieval and coordination, namely vectoring and interception, could not be accomplished effectively from the ground. In late 1979, DRDO accordingly formed a team to study the possibility of mounting an airborne radar on an existing aircraft.

The problem was not the availability of suitable aircraft but the lack of an effective airborne radar. An ad hoc team of specialists from DRDO's Electronics and Radar Development Establishment (LRDE) began work on developing an airborne radar, allowing the programme to proceed. Studies and analysis began in July 1985 under the project name 'Guardian', later (possibly in 1987) renamed 'Airawat'. In the late 1980s an HS 748 aircraft was fitted with a 24 ft x 5 ft composite rotodome. The aircraft flew with the pylon, but not the dome, in May 1989 and with the rotodome in November 1990. The Centre for Airborne Systems (CABS) was set up in February 1991, under Dr K. Ramchand to act as a systems house and integration agency using all the expertise and infrastructure available in India. At the peak of its operations, some 300 scientists and engineers were involved in the project. The aircraft was unveiled to the public during flight demonstrations at the inauguration ceremony of the first Aero India show held in Bangalore in December 1996. Two testbed aircraft transferred from the western command of the Indian Air Force, with tail numbers H-2175 and H-2176, were employed in the design program.

== Design ==
=== Antenna and rotodome ===
The platform's antenna is a slotted wave guide planar array and features very low side lobe levels and a narrow beam width in azimuth. It handles high power (better than 3.3 Kilowatt average) and weighs just 160 kg. For housing the primary and the secondary (IFF) antennas, an ellipsoidal structured (7.315 m x 1.524 m) rotodome was fabricated. It is made up of composites and aluminium alloy parts and is driven by a hydraulic servo system using aircraft hydraulic power. The rotodome has since been successfully flight tested with the ASP system.

=== Airborne data processor ===
The airborne radar data processor supports track-while-scan (TWS), which is required to form target tracks after receiving data from the various sensors of ASP, such as the primary radar and the secondary surveillance radar, which operate in TWS mode. The ARDP correlates the target plots from scan to scan to maintain the target tracks. It also correlates target information obtained from the secondary surveillance radar and endorsement with the primary radar track information. In May 1997, all the requirements were met and the system was delivered to CABS for integration.

=== Integrated navigation system ===
The ASP is guided by a high accuracy navigation system, which consists of an inertial navigation system and a Doppler navigation system. The velocity drifts of the inertial navigation system are contained by Doppler velocities using a Kalman filter, resulting in good navigation accuracy required for long endurance missions of ASP. Presently, work is in hand to integrate GPS/GLONASS receivers with the inertial navigation system to enhance performance, reliability and robustness.

== Integration and testing ==
System integration began in the late 1980s and by 1989 Hindustan Aeronautics (HAL) had modified three HS 748 aeroplanes with pylons as well as an additional auxiliary power unit to power the rotodome hydraulics, computers, communications and the onboard experimental gear. Trials began in 1989 and the complete aircraft flew for the first time in November 1990.

The trials lasted for approximately three years until the airborne radar data processors had to be replaced with a newer variant and the trials were suspended pending completion of the upgrade. In 1995, when the tests resumed, the platform met most of the programme goals. At the same time, however, the Air Headquarters staff re-affirmed previous doubts about whether the specifications could be met. This led to the Defence Ministry's informing the Air Headquarters and the Air Force that the ASP was not expected to meet their requirements, and that the possibility of providing an airborne early warning platform should be studied as a step toward gaining the necessary development experience. Though observers point to these differences as the reasons contributing to the handing over of the ASP project to the Indian Navy rather than the Indian Air Force, both the Indian Navy and Air Force originally helped define the requirements.

After this clarification, the project progressed with renewed vigour, only to be again delayed on 12 January 1999 when the second prototype crashed (the first prototype had been only a test-bed for pylon studies). Two crew, four scientists and two IAF engineers died in the crash, a total of eight people, with no survivors.

== Controversy about the platform ==
The main tasks allotted to CABS were the design, development, integration and evaluation of airborne electronic systems on a suitably modified flying platform for surveillance of airspace together with command and control functions and the transfer of appropriate technologies to industry. Besides CABS, LRDE and the Gas Turbine Research Establishment were entrusted with the development of ASP sub-systems.

The strategy adopted by CABS involved the development of an ASP using a rotodomed HS 748 aircraft as the flight test bed, as the first phase of the development of an indigenous airborne early warning technology to be evolved using a step by step, modular, low cost and low risk approach.

The selection of the particular platform was controversial. Particularly, this was an issue because Indian Airlines had completely phased out the HS 748 in 1989, citing passenger safety. Though the IAF continued to operate them in a logistics role, military leaders did not favor use of this platform for an airborne early warning (AEW) aircraft.

In October 1992 the Air Headquarters, while commenting on the system specification document, stated that the specifications were meant for ASP and were not expected to meet the Air Staff Requirements at that stage, although the design philosophy was targeted towards meeting the Air Staff Requirements at a later stage. The Ministry of Defence stated in February 1999 that ASP was not meant to meet the requirements of users but to induct and demonstrate the technology by utilizing the only viable platform. The fact remains that the ASP development programme was taken up as a first step towards the development of full-fledged AWACS, the need for which was projected by the military services in the early 1980s.

Following the 1999 crash, the ASP programme had been delayed for about three years. But due to the differences in opinion and chiefly due to the reported unreliability of the HS 748 platform, the project was discontinued.

== Revival ==
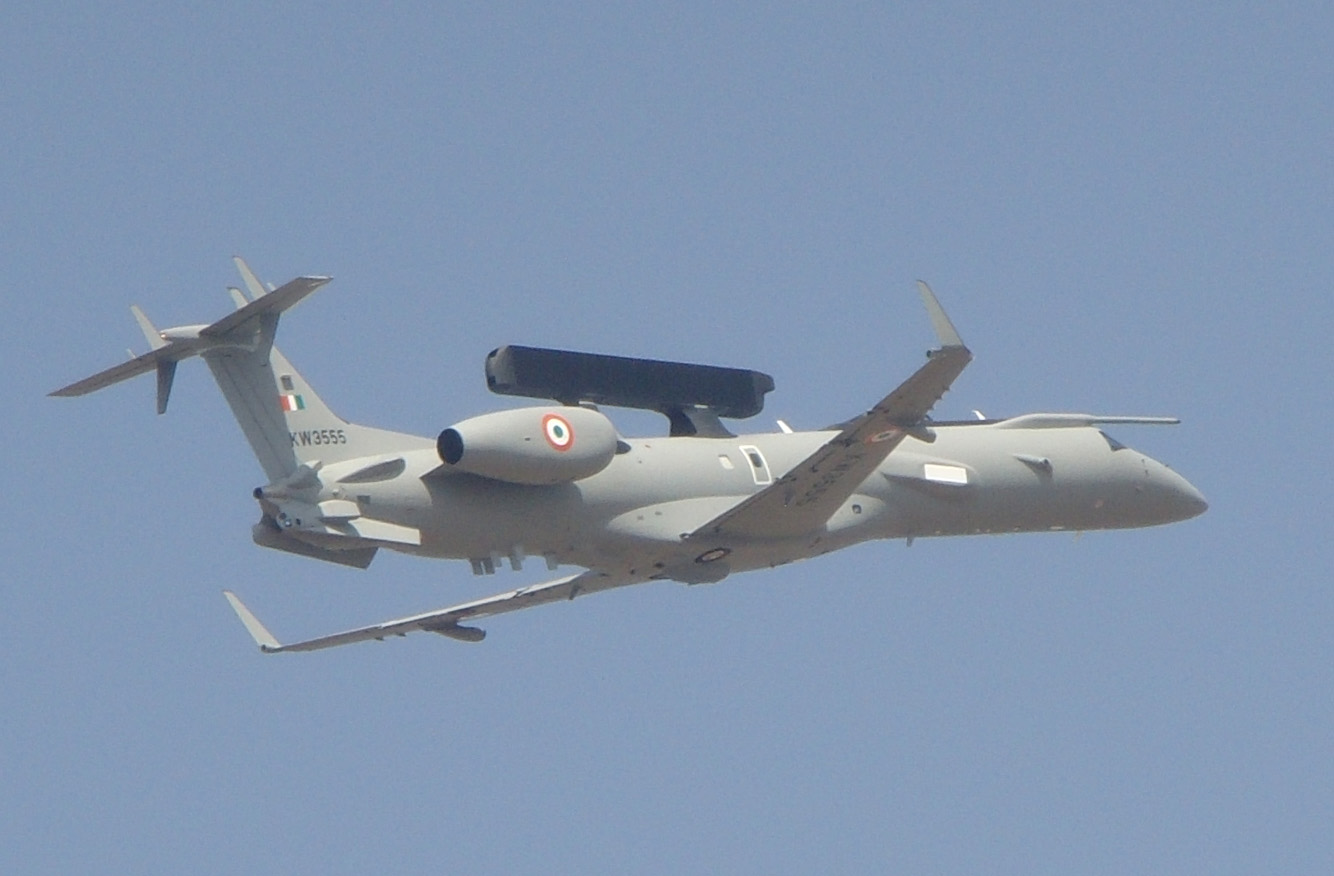
Netra AEW&C in Aero India 2017

By mid-2002 the project had been "re-activated", according to various news reports. As of March 2007, CABS was working on developing another indigenous airborne early warning system. According to the Defence Minister, completion of development activities and commencement of user trials were to occur in 2012. The platform selected was the Brazilian Embraer with a CABS airborne Active Electronic Scanned Array (AESA) radar.

The new system will be based on the Embraer EMB-145I aircraft and an active phased array radar. The Indian Air Force and the Army propose to use this mini-AWACs system as a complement to the larger AWACS system being imported from Israel. The Union Cabinet has approved the development of such an aircraft-based system.

On 17 August 2012, India received the first EMB-145I airborne early warning and control aircraft built with Indian technology. It is claimed as a major breakthrough in mounting an electronic eye in the sky for India.

The aircraft is fitted with Indian airborne Active Electronic Scanned Array (AESA) radar, giving it the capability to detect missiles and hostile fighters at all angles. Programme Director Christopher was quoted by the media as saying, "The new EMB 145 would have airborne Active Electronic Scanned Array (AESA) radar designed by DRDO’s Banglaore-based Centre for Airborne Systems (CABS). DRDO will integrate other mission systems in India and deliver the aircraft to the Indian Air Force”.

Dr. Elangovan, Chief Controller Research & Development of DRDO, said the aircraft was upgraded to have major capabilities such as "in-fight refuelling system, significant increase in electric and cooling capacity and a comprehensive set of structural changes to allow installation of advanced mission systems."

The third NETRA AEW&C completed flight trials and acceptance trials in 2023 after integrating with all mission systems in initial operational clearance configuration, including SDRs, and an indigenous ESM/RWR. As of 2023-24, it has been delivered to IAF by the DRDO in the identical configuration as the two AEW&Cs before it. By January 2025, three aircraft have been delivered in IOC configuration and the final operational clearance (FOC) is in advanced stage. On 25 June, DRDO transferred the FOC certificate for the Netra AEW&C system to the Indian Air Force during a formal ceremony presided over by the Deputy Chief of the Air Staff, Air Marshal Awadhesh Kumar Bharti, in Bengaluru.

== See also ==
- E-2 Hawkeye
- E-3 Sentry
