= Embraer R-99 =

Airborne early warning and reconnaissance aircraft based on the ERJ-145

E-99/P-99/R-99
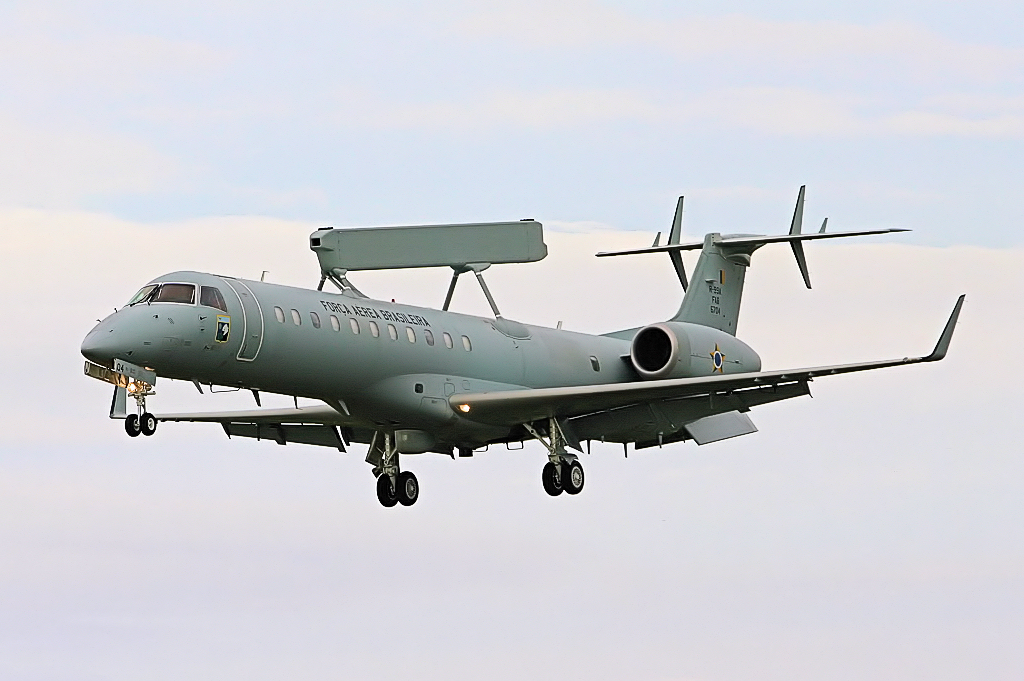
- Brazilian Air Force E-99

General information
- Type: Airborne early warning and control (AEW&C) (E-99); Remote sensing (R-99); Maritime patrol (P-99)
- National origin: Brazil
- Manufacturer: Embraer
- Status: Active in service
- Primary users: Brazilian Air Force (E-99M/R-99) Hellenic Air Force (R-99A); Mexican Air Force (R-99A/P-99); Indian Air Force (Netra AEW&C)
- Number built: 6 (EMB-145-SA); 3 (EMB-145-RS); 2 (EMB-145-MP); 4 (EMB-145-H); 3 (EMB-145-I)

History
- Manufactured: 1999–present
- Introduction date: 2001
- First flight: 1999
- Developed from: Embraer ERJ-145

The Embraer R-99 is the Brazilian Air Force (FAB) military designation of the EMB-145-RS. Various models of the aircraft have been produced to perform special mission duties, including the E99 for airborne early warning and control (AEW&C) missions, the R-99 for remote sensing, and the P-99 for maritime patrol.

Development of the R-99 began during the 1990s in response to a FAB requirement for an airborne early warning and control (AEW&C) platform, as well for the export market. The airframe is based on the ERJ 145 civil regional jet and modified with specialised mission equipment based on the mission role desired. It is typically powered by a pair of Rolls-Royce AE1 3007 turbofan engines; the military versions provide 20% more thrust than the civil version. The maiden flight of the R-99 took place in 1999; it entered operational service with the FAB two years later.

Export customers for the type include the Hellenic Air Force, Mexican Air Force, and the Indian Air Force. Some customers have opted to buy the airframe and separately outfit it with their own electronics packages. It has been deployed in response to various events, including the Shining Path hostage crisis, the loss of Air France Flight 447, the 2011 military intervention in Libya, and the SIVAM program. During the 2010s, the FAB opted to modernise their R-99 fleet, not only extending its service life but also giving it new capabilities, such as a longer effective radar range and datalink facilities. Embraer has proposed new variants of the type, such as the armed P-99 anti-submarine warfare (ASW), which is to be capable of using both torpedoes and anti-ship missiles.

== Variants ==
The R-99A/E-99/EMB 145 AEW&C is an airborne early warning and control (AEW&C) aircraft, equipped with the Erieye active electronically scanned array radar from Saab Microwave Systems. During the aircraft's development, particular attention was paid to market interest as well the specific requirements of the Brazilian Air Force (FAB). The FAB have claimed that R-99 has 95% of the capability of larger AEW&C aircraft which are in service in the air forces of other nations. During 2008, the FAB redesignated the R-99A as the E-99, the factory name for the Embraer EMB-145SA (Surveillance Aircraft), a special military conversion of the passenger version of the Embraer ERJ-145LR.

The R-99B/R-99/EMB 145 MULTI INTEL is a remote sensing aircraft. It employs a synthetic aperture radar, combination electro-optical and FLIR systems as well as a multi-spectral scanner. The aircraft also possesses signal intelligence and C3I capabilities. During 2008, the FAB redesignated the R-99B as the R-99, for the Embraer EMB-145RS (Remote Sensing), a special military conversion of the passenger version of the Embraer ERJ-145LR.

The EMB 145 MP is the maritime patrol version of the EMB-145. It shares much of the same sensor suite as the R-99B, but most visibly, lacks the multi-spectral scanner and the side-looking radar. It retains many of the C3I and ELINT capabilities of the EMB-145-RS. Mexico was the launch customer for this variant.

The P-99 would be the anti-submarine warfare (ASW) modification of the EMB 145 MP and would have four underwing hardpoints, which could be mounted with a variety of torpedoes and/or anti-ship missiles. No prototype with those modifications was ever flown.

During June 2019, it was announced that Embraer had partnered with the Israeli defense electronics company Elta Systems to develop the P600 AEW, which will be initially based on the Embraer Praetor 600 super-midsize business jet. In December 2020, an Embraer spokesperson stated that the P600 AEW system is likely to eventually replace the E-99 AEW; however, the Brazilian Air Force has currently committed itself to the moderization of its existing E-99 fleet, thus it is likely that the E-99M will be in service for a long time, while there were no orders placed for the P600.

== Operational history ==
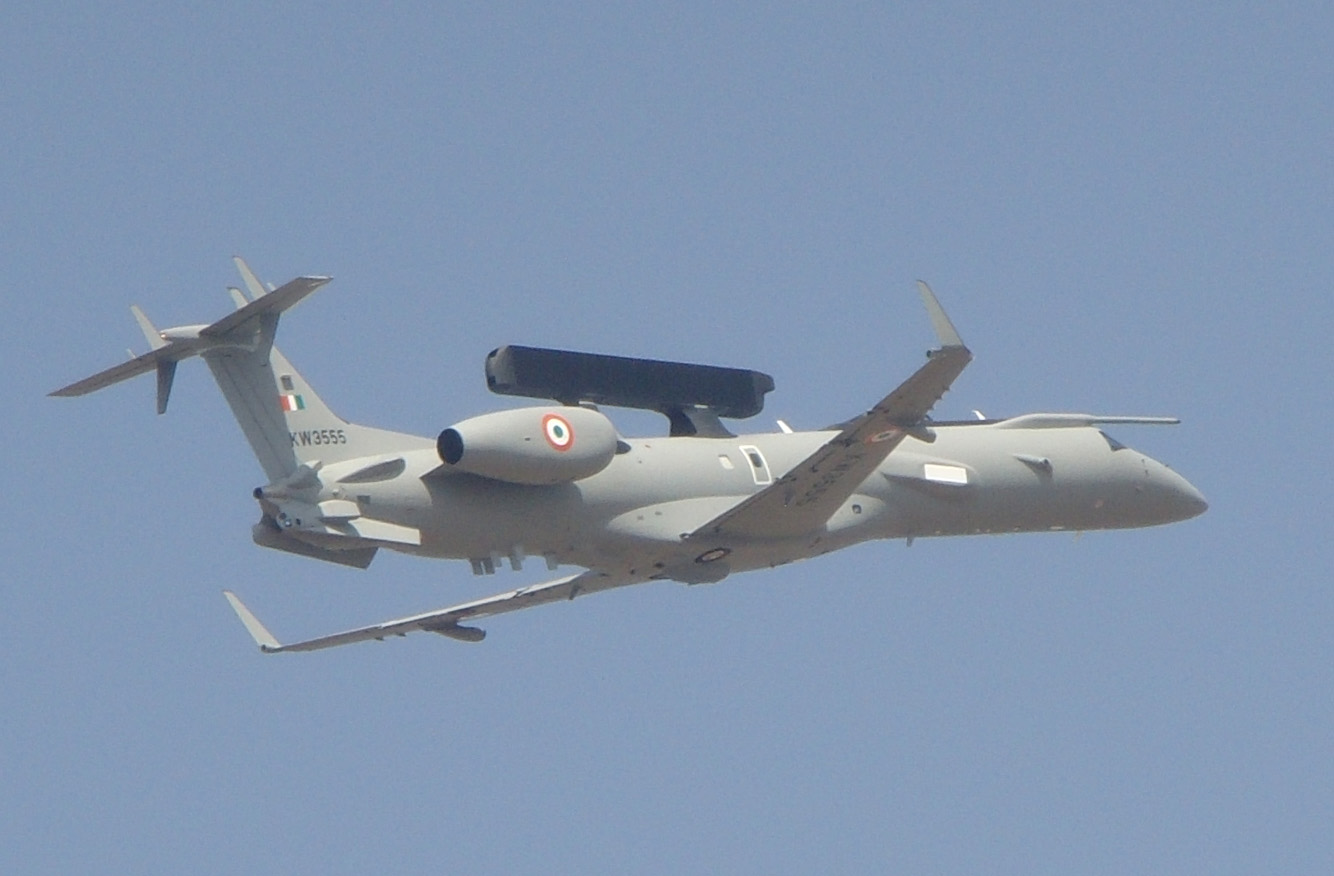
Indian Air Force's Embraer ERJ 145 with Netra AEW&C

During September 2003, a Brazilian R-99 was deployed on request of Peruvian authorities to locate the site where 71 hostages were being kept by the armed group Shining Path. The aircraft detected the origin of VHF signals, and thus aided the Peruvian authorities in the recovery of the hostages.

On 1 June 2009, a R-99 was deployed on the search for the missing Air France Flight 447. The fact is reported as the first real mission of a Brazilian R-99 on maritime search. The R-99 synthetic-aperture radar allowed to locate — even at night and under bad weather conditions — aircraft's debris and victims bodies 800 km away from Fernando de Noronha Archipelago. Various pieces of debris from the lost Airbus A330-200, the largest being the empennage and a galley, were located by the R-99.

During early 2011, a Greek EMB-145-H was deployed to perform AEW missions as part of the 2011 military intervention in Libya, specifically in the enforcement of a no-fly zone over Libya, in response to the Libyan Civil War.

The Indian Air Force has procured an initial three aircraft, which have been outfitted in India with an AESA radar array developed by the Electronics and Radar Development Establishment along with a datalink, identification friend or foe (IFF), radar warning receiver (RWR), and other systems. The first aircraft was delivered from Brazil on 16 August 2012 while the second followed in December 2012. The Air Force has the option to purchase another seven aircraft. Following a long "technology absorption" process, Bharat Electronics Limited (BEL) has been selected as the Engineering and Life Support Agency (ELSA) for India's DRDO's (Defence Research and Development Organisation) EMB-145i AEW&C mission systems, while Embraer will be responsible for supporting the aircraft. The platform is in service with No. 200 Squadron IAF, based at Bathinda AFS, as the Netra AEW&C.

In Brazilian service, the E-99 and R-99 are operated by Squadron Guardião and are based at Air Wing 2, Anapolis AFB. Five E-99s and three R-99s are operated by the Brazilian Air Force as part of the SIVAM program. Starting in 2013, these E-99s have undergone a modernization program that involved the updating of all onboard electronics, including a new Erieye-ER (extended range) radar, the same used on GlobalEye. The detection range for the E-99M version was increased from 450 km to 723 km. The range of targets that can be detected ranges from vessels and large aircraft to watercraft, rubber dinghies and vehicles, as well as hovering helicopters. The first E-99M ("M" stands for modernized) was expected in the first half of 2020, and was handed over to the Brazilian Air Force on 27 November 2020 in a ceremony held at the Embraer facility in Gavião Peixoto, São Paulo. The fifth and final modernized aircraft was delivered on 23 November 2023 with Full Operational Capability.

During 2022, during the Russian invasion of Ukraine, Hellenic EMB-145H's flew several daily combat missions, monitoring NATO allied airspace over Romania and Bulgaria while covering part of the Black Sea.

== Operators ==
Brazil

- Brazilian Air Force – 5 E-99Ms and 3 R-99s. The five E-99Ms (modernized E-99) were delivered between 2020 and 2023.

Greece

- Hellenic Air Force – 4 EMB-145-H (HAF designation is "Erieye EMB-145H AEW&C")

Mexico

- Mexican Air Force – 1 EMB-145-SA (FAM designation EMB-145AEW&C), 2 EMB-145-MP

India

- Indian Air Force – Platform Only - 3 EMB-145-I were fitted with an Indian-developed AESA radar array along with other apparatus. Operated as the Netra AEW&C.

== Gallery ==
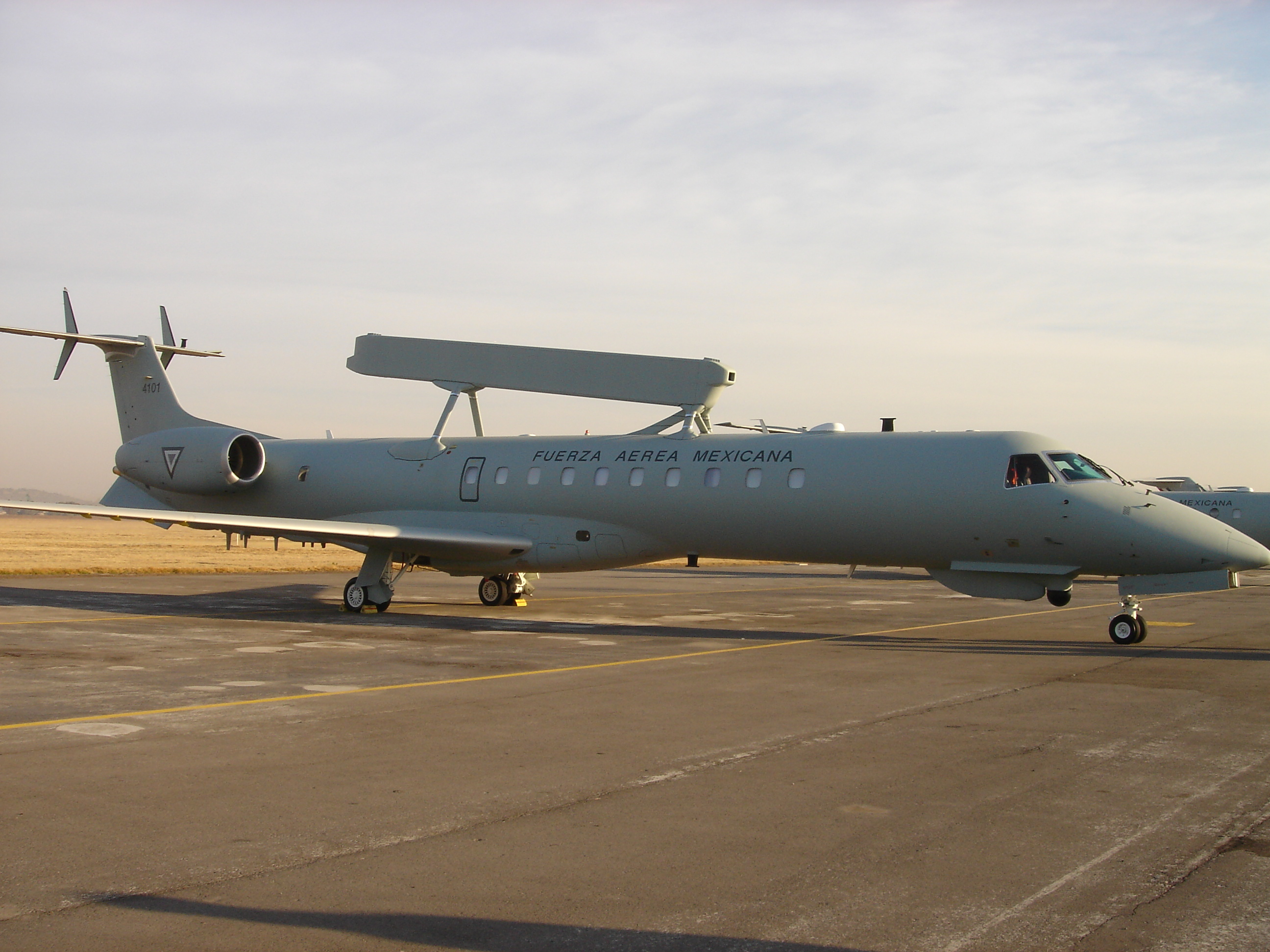
An Embraer EMB-145-SA AEW&C of the Mexican Air Force at Santa Lucia AFB.

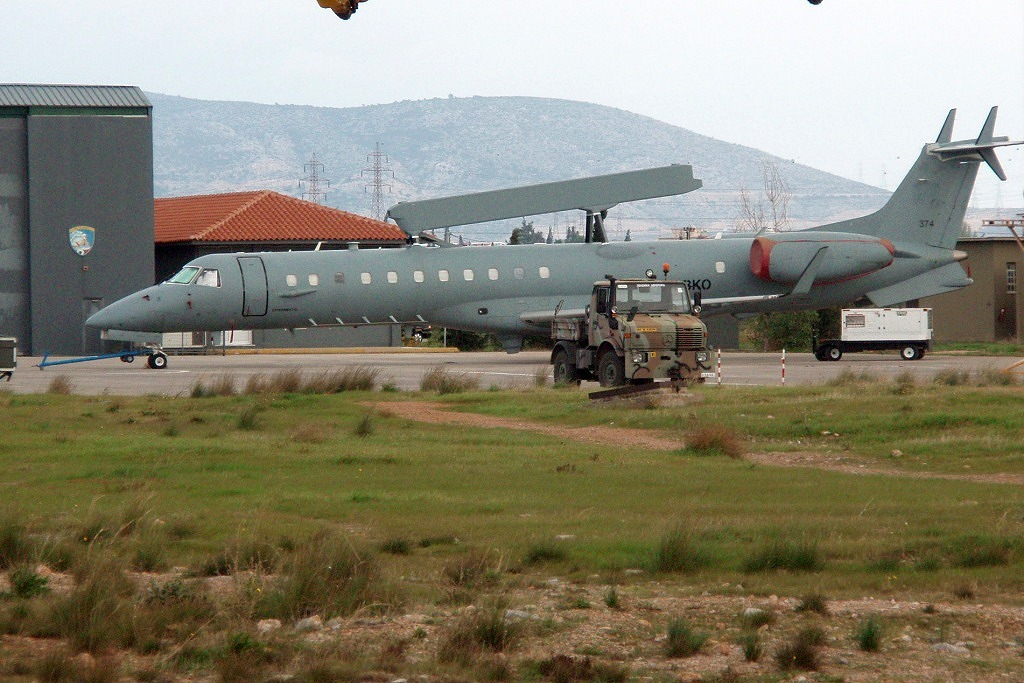
An Embraer EMB-145H AEW&C of the Hellenic Air Force during delivery tests at Elefsis AB, Greece.

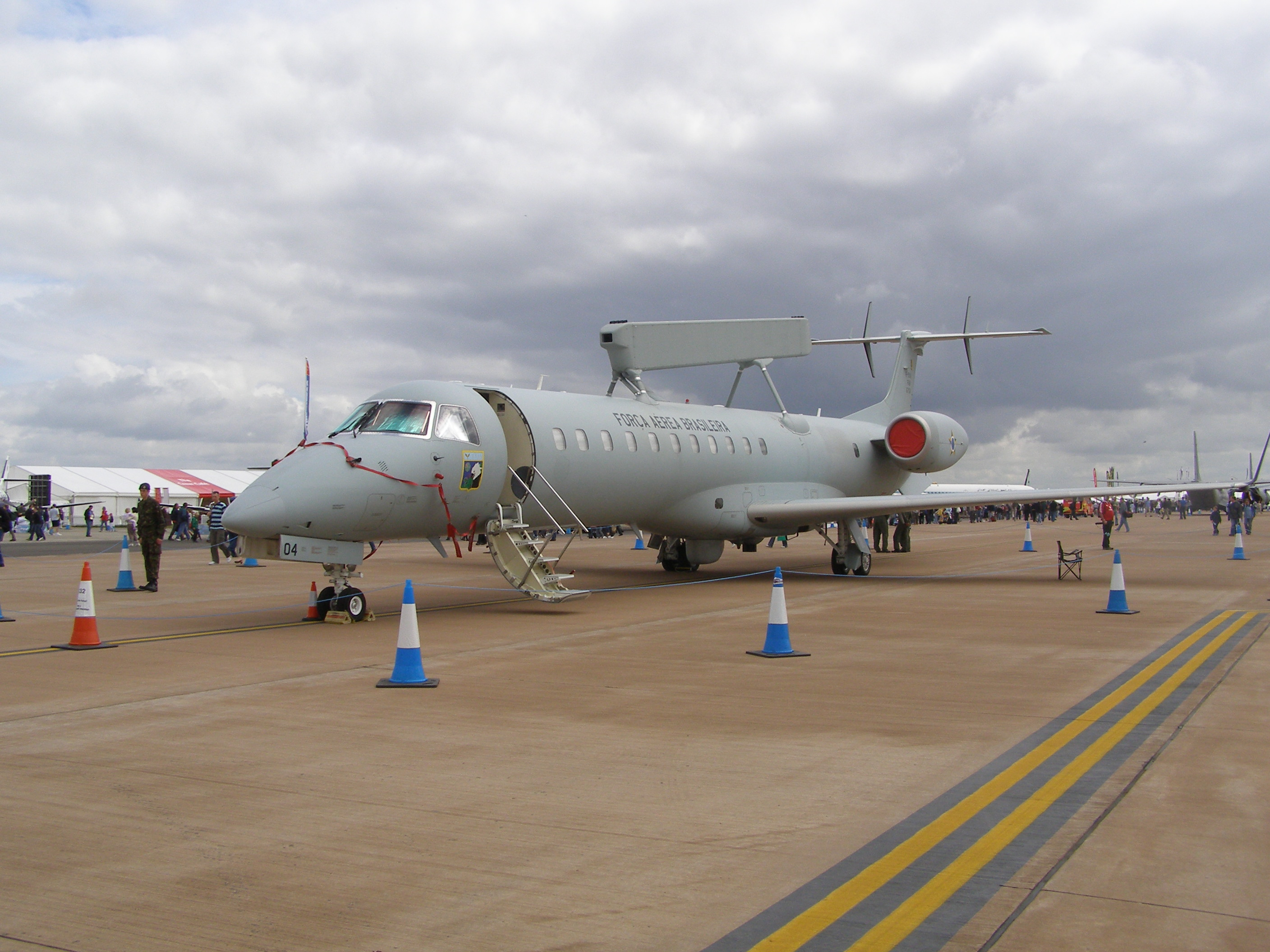
An Embraer EMB-145-SA, E-99 (Brazilian Air Force designation) of the Brazilian Air Force on display at RAF Fairford, England, during an airshow.

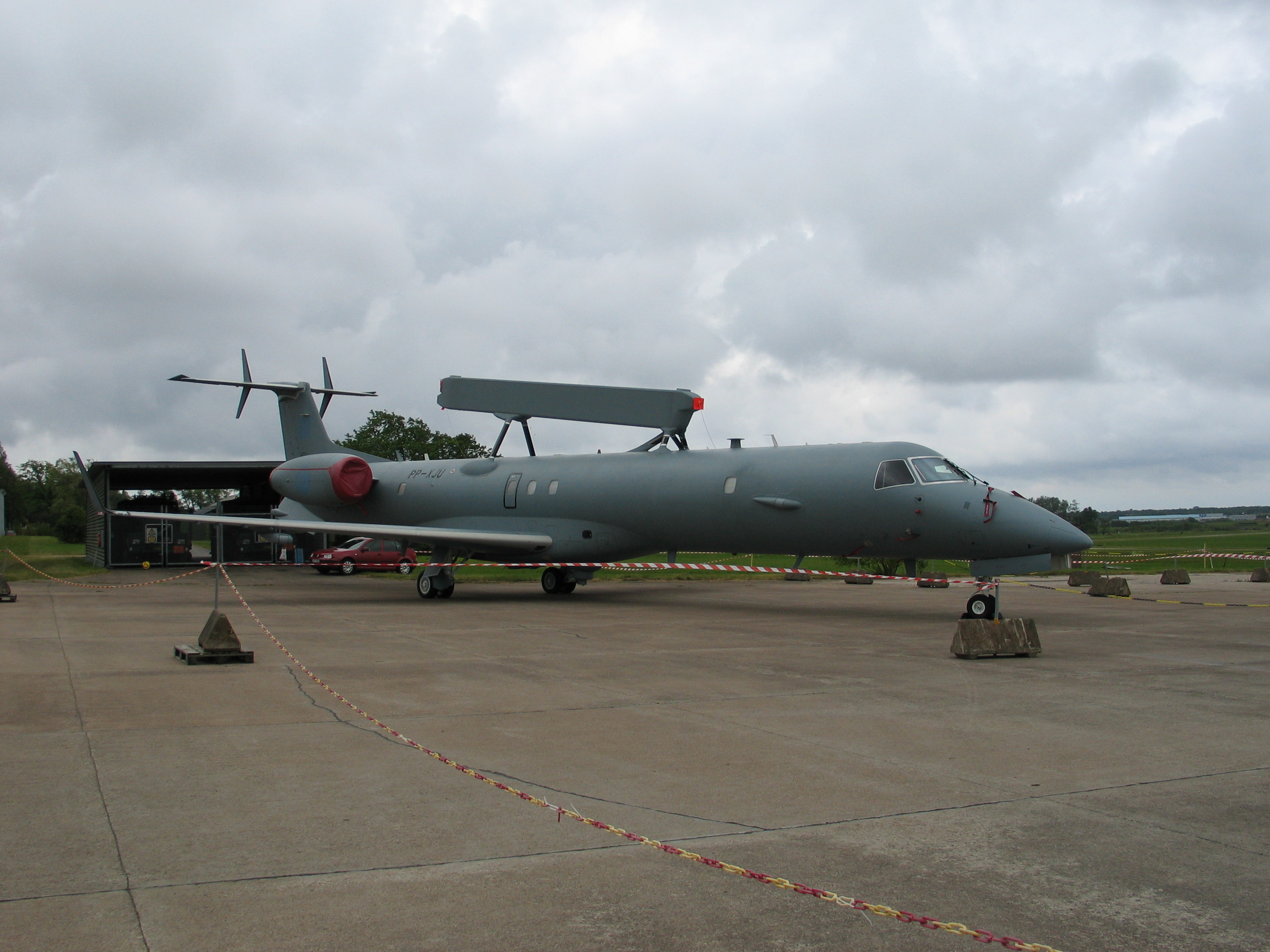
Embraer EMB-145-H AEW&C during trials in Halmstad, Sweden, before delivery to the Hellenic Air Force.

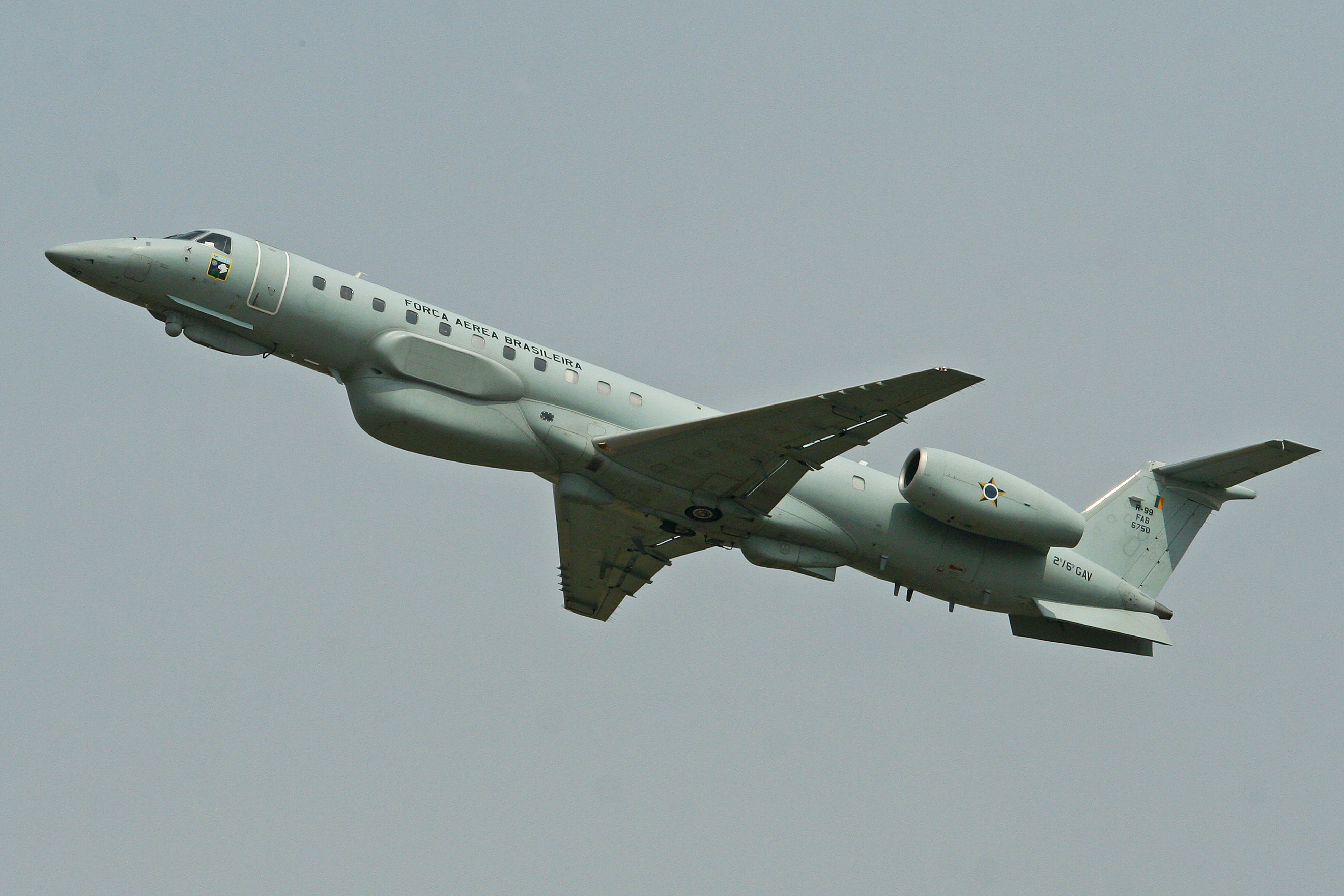
EMB-145-RS (R-99) in 2013

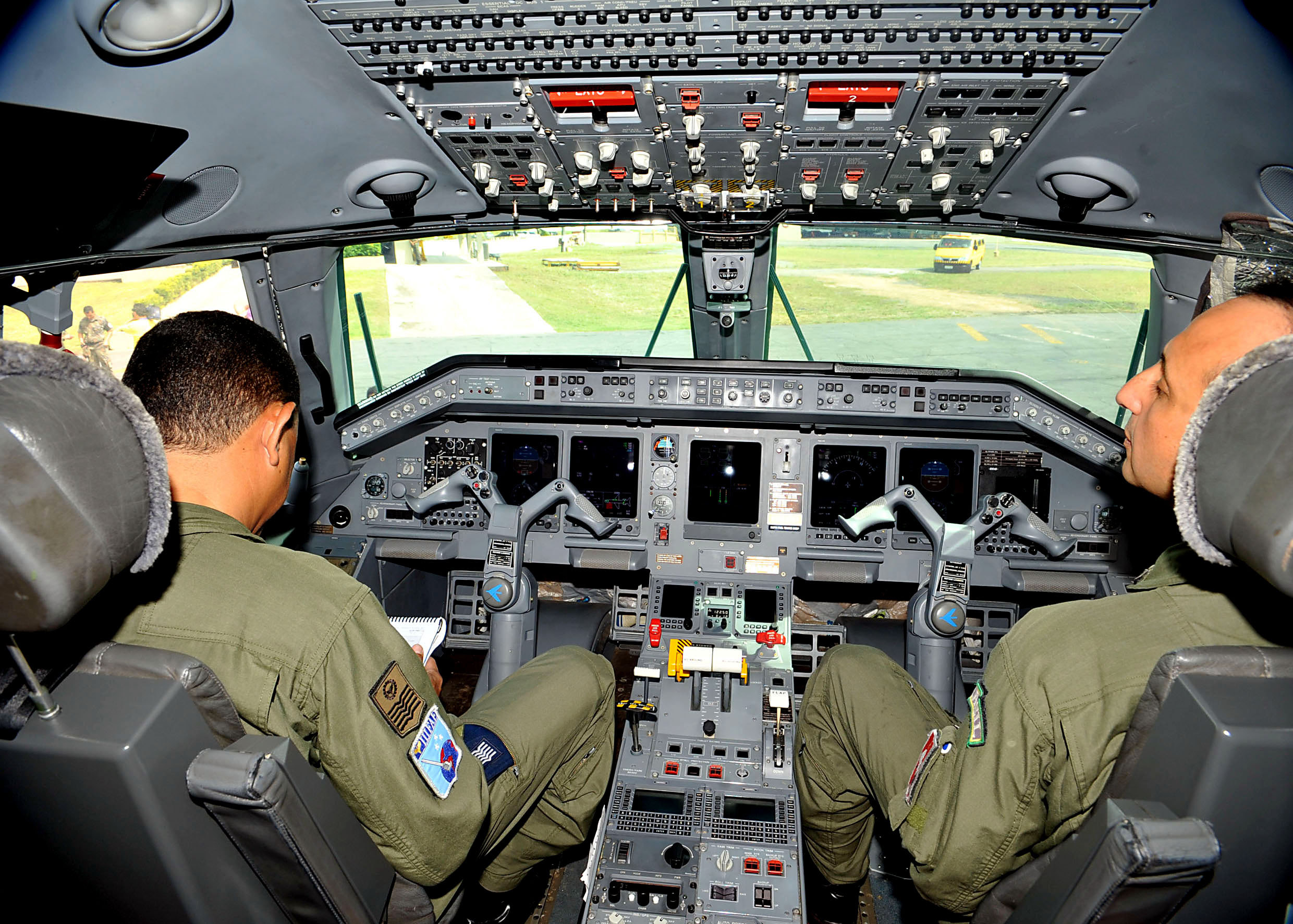
Cockpit of a R-99 airplane of the Brazilian Air Force

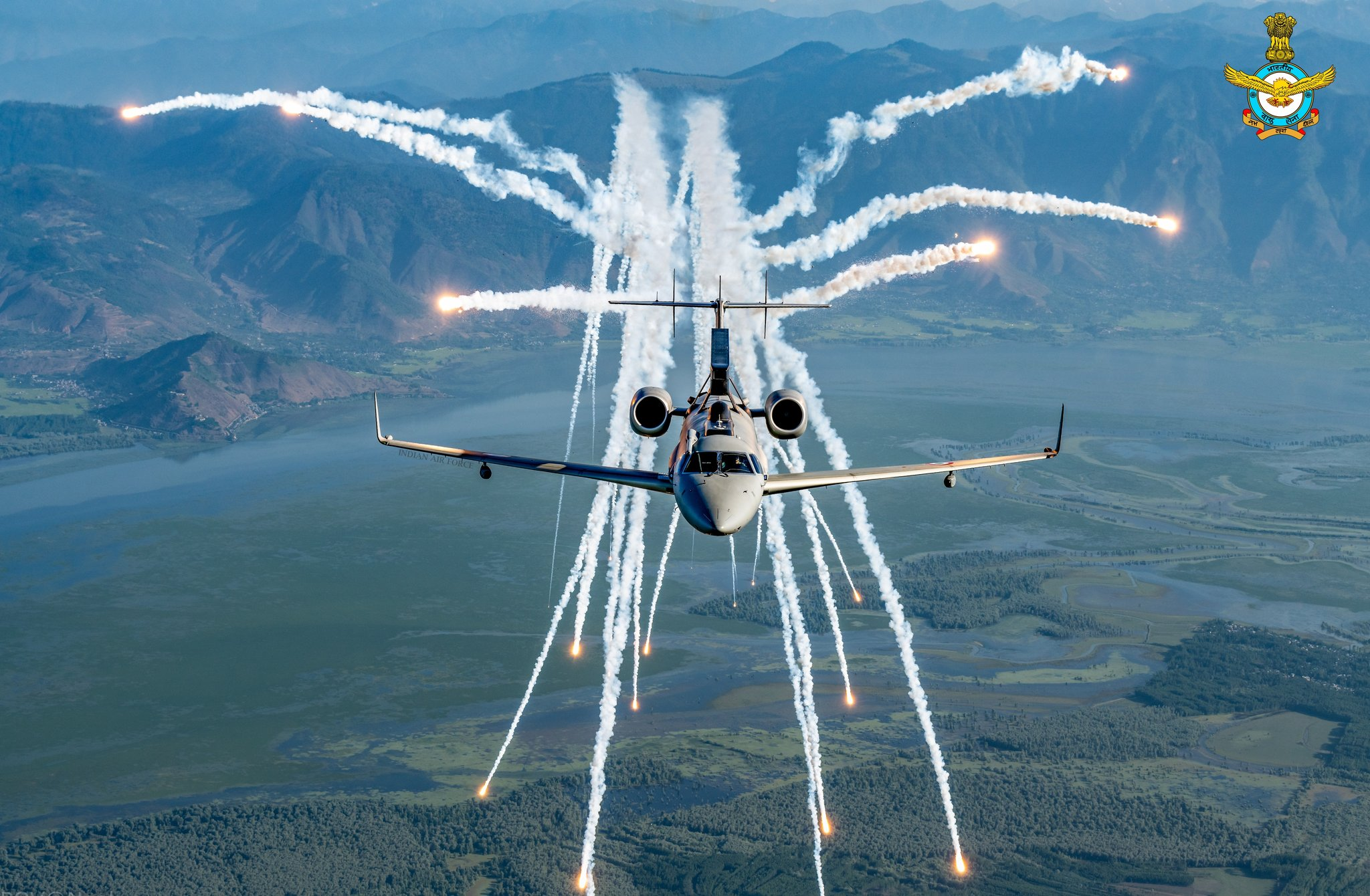
DRDO Netra of the Indian Air Force

== See also ==
Related development

- Embraer ERJ 145 family

Aircraft of comparable role, configuration, and era

- DRDO AEW&CS
- Dassault Falcon 8X ARCHANGE
- Raytheon Sentinel
- Saab GlobalEye
- Gulfstream G550 CAEW Eitam
- KJ-200
