= No. 200 Squadron IAF =

No. 200 Squadron
- Active: 4 December 2014–present
- Country: India
- Role: Airborne early warning and control
- Garrison/HQ: Bathinda AFS, Punjab
- Nickname: "Netra"
- Mottos: Uttipth Jayat Shatruon; Extended victory over enemies

Aircraft flown
- Transport: Netra AEW&C (EMB-145I platform

No. 200 Squadron is a unit of the Indian Air Force assigned to Western Air Command based out of Bathinda AFS, Punjab. The squadron participates in electronic intelligence, reconnaissance, Airborne early warning and control operations.

== Aircraft ==
- Netra AEW&C (EMB-145I platform)
