= Amazon Surveillance System =

Surveillance system used for monitoring Amazônia Legal

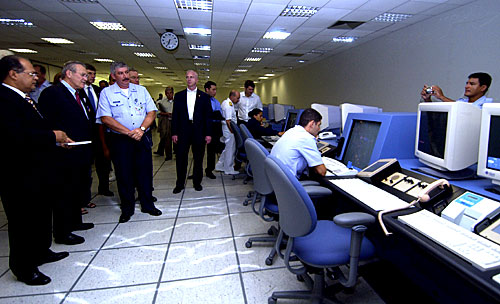
US Secretary of Defence Donald Rumsfeld visits SIVAM in Manaus, Amazonas, Brazil

The Amazon Surveillance System (SIVAM, Portuguese: Sistema de Vigilância da Amazônia), is a complex surveillance system used for monitoring Amazônia Legal ("legal Amazon area"). This area includes the Brazilian rainforest, to curb the trafficking of illegal narcotics and to curb illegal logging or burning of the forest. The system uses a mixture of fixed and mobile ground radar, as well as airborne surveillance using the Embraer ERJ 145. The combined platform is called the R-99.

The U.S. military contractor Raytheon, the Brazilian firm ATECH, the Canadian aerospace company MacDonald Dettwiler (MDA) and Embraer won the tender to build the SIVAM system. Today, the project has delivered its equipment to the government, creating the SIPAM (Amazonian Protection System) and enhancing the Brazilian Airspace Control System. SIPAM headquarters are located in Brasília, Brazil.

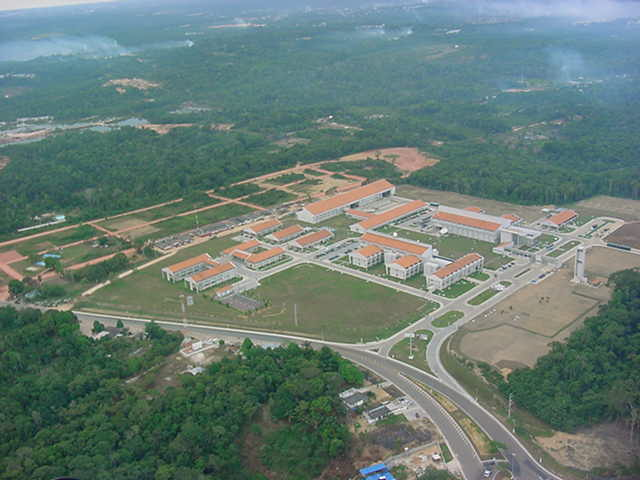
The SIVAM complex

== Raytheon controversy ==
Allegations of bribery were made against Raytheon in 1995 in connection with its efforts to win a 1.4 billion US dollar radar contract from Brazil for the SIVAM project. SIVAM, the acronym for "System for Vigilance over the Amazon," was a complex radar surveillance system planned to be used to monitor the Amazon rainforest, allegedly to curb the trafficking of narcotics and to curb illegal logging or burning of the forest. Brazilian police wiretapped a telephone conversation between a special advisor to the Brazilian President Fernando Henrique Cardoso, and Raytheon's operative in Brazil, Jose Afonso Assumpcão. According to transcripts published in the Brazilian national weekly Isto É, when Assumpcão told Gomes dos Santos that Brazilian Senator Gilberto Miranda might block the Raytheon contract, Gomes dos Santos responded, "Damn, did you already pay this guy?". Gomes dos Santos and Brazil's aviation minister resigned because of allegations that this conversation suggested that bribes were paid. Raytheon ultimately was awarded the contract after lobbying by the administration of U.S. President Bill Clinton.

== See also ==
- Surveillance

== Bibliography ==
- (in French) Michel Braudeau, « L'espion qui vient du ciel » (Espionage which comes from the sky), in Le rêve amazonien, éditions Gallimard, 2004 (ISBN 2-07-077049-4).
