= Virk Kalan =

- Village
- Country: India
- State: Punjab
- District: Bathinda
- Sub-district: Bathinda

Population (2001)
  - Total: 2,520

Virk Kalan is a village in Bathinda sub-district, Bathinda district, Punjab, India. It has a population of 2,520 per the 2001 national census. The village has four schools and bus service to Bathinda. In addition, the Bathinda airport is located nearby, which offers direct flights to Delhi.

== Demographics ==
According to the 2001 national census, Virk Kalan has a population of 2,520, 1,333 of whom are males and 1,187 of whom are females.

== Education ==
Per the 2001 census, Virk Kalan has one primary school, one middle school, one secondary school and one senior secondary school.

== Transport ==
Virk Kalan is located near the Bathinda airport, which gained nonstop flights from Delhi in December 2016. As of December 2016, two private buses offer service between the village and the city of Bathinda, which is about 25 kilometres (16 mi) away.
