= Defence Electronics Application Laboratory =

Indian defense laboratory

Coordinates: 30°19′18″N 78°04′06″E

- Location: Dehradun
- Operating agency: DRDO

Center for Defence Electronics Application Laboratory (DEAL) is a laboratory of the Defence Research & Development Organization (DRDO). Located in Dehradun, its primary function is research and development in the radio communication devices for defence applications. Its mission is development of Radio Communication Systems, Data links, Satellite Communication Systems, Millimeter Wave Communication systems

== Areas of work ==
DEAL is developing communication systems and data links for Airawat Airborne Early Warning and Control System. DEAL is also engaged in development of image processing technologies. The Image Analysis Center at DEAL has developed image processing software for Defense Forces. The Image Analysis Center works in the following areas -

Image Archival, Visualization & Interpretation tool, Classification tools, Stereo processing, Target Detection, Radar image processing, Terrain modeling & simulation, Product generation
