= Centre for Airborne Systems =

Indian defence research organisation

- Motto: Meet the technological challenges of Airborne Surveillance Systems
- Established: 1 February 1991
- Field of research: Airborne electronic systems
- Director: Smt P Santhya
- Location: Bengaluru
- Operating agency: DRDO

The Centre for Airborne Systems (CABS) is a laboratory of the Defence Research and Development Organisation (DRDO) of India. Located in Bengaluru, its primary function is development and evaluation of airborne electronic systems for military applications.

== History ==
CABS was set up in 1991 to lead the Airborne Surveillance Platform (Airawat) project. Its task was to develop airborne electronic systems on a flying platform for early warning, command and control functions. The programme was carried on until 1999 when the flying platform HS 748 crashed in Tamil Nadu killing all the eight people on board [4 from IAF and 4 from DRDO out of which two were from CABS (Mr P Elango and Mr Shaju)].

== EMB 145 AEW&C project ==
Embraer and the Indian Government have signed a deal for three Embraer 145 AEW&C (Airborne Early Warning & Control) jets. The contract includes a comprehensive logistics package comprising training, technical support, spare parts, and ground support equipment.

The ERJ 145 platform, currently being used on Intelligence, Surveillance and Reconnaissance (ISR) missions in Brazil, Mexico and Greece, will join the AEW&C programme under the responsibility of India's Defence Research & Development Organisation (DRDO).

On 17 August 2012, India received the first Embraer 145 Airborne Early Warning and Control Aircraft, built with Indian technology. It is claimed as a major breakthrough in mounting an electronic eye in the sky for India.

The aircraft is fitted with Indian airborne Active Electronically Scanned Array (AESA) radar, giving it the capability to detect missiles and hostile fighters at all angles. Programme Director, Christopher was quoted by the media as saying, "The new EMB 145 would have airborne Active Electronic Scanned Array (AESA) radar designed by DRDO’s Bengaluru-based Centre for Airborne Systems (CABS). DRDO will integrate other mission systems in India and deliver the aircraft to the Indian Air Force".

Dr Elangovan, Chief Controller Research & Development of DRDO, said the aircraft was upgraded to have major capabilities such as "in-fight refuelling system, significant increase in electric and cooling capacity and a comprehensive set of structural changes to allow installation of advanced mission systems."
