= Centre for Military Airworthiness and Certification =

Indian laboratory

Centre for Military Airworthiness and Certification (CEMILAC)
- Established: 1995
- Field of research: Airworthiness certification
- Director: Mr. PRASAD
- Staff: 130 scientists and 50 technical officers
- Location: Marathahalli Colony, Near Borewell Bus Stop, Bengaluru-560037, Bangalore, Karnataka
- Campus: Marathalli Colony
- Operating agency: DRDO

The Centre for Military Airworthiness & Certification (CEMILAC) is a laboratory of the Indian Defence Research and Development Organisation (DRDO). Located in Bangalore, its primary function is certification and qualification of military aircraft and airborne systems. Some of its achievements are issuance of IOC for LCA, ALH.Clearance for Bio-ATF for AN-32. It has 14 regional centres located across the country.
