= Bathinda Airport =

Airport of Punjab, India

Bathinda Airport ਬਠਿੰਡਾ ਹਵਾਈ ਅੱਡਾ
- IATA: BUP; ICAO: VIBT

Summary
- Airport type: Military/Public
- Owner: Indian Air Force
- Operator: Airports Authority of India
- Serves: Bathinda
- Location: Virk Kalan, Bathinda district, Punjab, India
- Opened: 1975; 51 years ago
- Elevation AMSL: 201 m (659 ft)
- Coordinates: 30°16′12″N 74°45′20″E
- Website: Bathinda Airport

Map
- Location within Punjab Location within India

Runways
Direction	Length		Surface
Direction	m	ft	Surface
13/31	2,804	9,199	Asphalt/Concrete

Statistics (April 2025 - March 2026)
- Passengers: 14,675 (▼52.7%)
- Aircraft movements: 665 (▼50%)
- Cargo tonnage: 0 ( 0%)
- Source: AAI

Bathinda Airport (IATA: BUP, ICAO: VIBT) is a domestic airport and an Indian Air Force base serving the city of Bathinda and the Malwa region in Punjab, India. It is located 16 kilometres (9.9 mi) north-west of the city in Virk kalan and near the village of Virk khurd. The airport operates commercial flights under the Airports Authority of India as a civil enclave of the Bhisiana Air Force Station. Alliance Air was the only commercial airline that operated flights from the airport to Delhi from December 2016 till 2020. Since then, the airport remained inactive, until when in September 2023, FlyBig, restarted flight operations by starting flights to Ghaziabad and later to Dehradun from 18 September 2023.

== History ==
In 1975, Bhisiana Air Force Station (AFS) was built.

In 1980, the Indian Air Force allowed the operation private, charter and government flights from the base.

On 11 December 2016, civil enclave was inaugurated at the AFS to facilitate socio-economic development in the Malwa region and improve connectivity under the UDAN Scheme, when Alliance Air commenced the civilian flight operations the same day to Delhi. It was the only route until 2020, when the airline indefinitely suspended operations due to the COVID-19 pandemic. After a break of over three years, the regional carrier, FlyBig, restarted flight operations from the airport to Ghaziabad and at a future date to Dehradun, on 18 September 2023.

== Air Force Station ==
The airport functions as a civil enclave at the Bhisiana Air Force Station. Built in 1975, it is the 34th Wing of the No. 108 Squadron IAF. Its status was upgraded to one of the most strategically important air force stations as well as to a wing on 18 February 1980. The Indian Air Force provides air traffic control and emergency services for the airport.

The Indian Army has also deployed some of its aviation units here. On 18 June 2024, the Army received one of the two Drishti-10 Starliner UAV which has been based here.

== Civil enclave ==
=== Infrastructure ===
The airport has a 1,200-square-metre (13,000 sq ft) terminal for commercial flights built at a cost of ₹25 crore (US$2.6 million). It has a capacity for 100 passengers with a waiting area that can seat 30 people. It contains two check-in counters and a VIP lounge. It has a runway numbered 13/31, measuring 2,804 metres (9,199 ft) in length. The apron can park two aircraft similar to the ATR 72-600 aircraft in size.

=== Airlines and destinations ===
Airlines	Destinations
Alliance Air	Delhi
FlyBig	Ghaziabad

== Connectivity ==
The airport is located at Virk kalan, 16 kilometres (9.9 mi) north-west of Bathinda. The nearest bus station is located 2 kilometres (1.2 mi) from the airport, from where direct bus services are operated by the PEPSU Road Transport Corporation (PRTC) to the city. NH-7 is 8 km to the south, NH-754 11 km to the east, Balluana railway station 9 km (5.6 mi) in the south.

== See also ==
- List of airports in Punjab
- UDAN Scheme
- Indian Air Force
- No. 108 Squadron IAF
