= Full operating capability =

Military logistics term

In military acquisition, full operating capability or full operational capability (FOC) is the completion of a development effort. This is usually preceded by an initial operating capability or initial operational capability (IOC) phase.

For the United States Department of Defense military acquisition FOC is defined as "in general attained when all units and/or organizations in the force structure scheduled to receive a system have received it and have the ability to employ and maintain it. The specifics for any particular system FOC are defined in that system’s Capability Development Document (CDD) and Capability Production Document (CPD)."

FOC is a certification event marking completion of training, providing maintenance facilities, and end of planned production of the item. This does not preclude additional orders to obtain the item outside that contract or after that contract FOC.
