= MRCA =

MRCA may refer to:

- Member of the Royal College of Anaesthetists, United Kingdom
- Most recent common ancestor, a term referring to the most recent ancestor any set of organisms are directly descended from
- Mid-right coronary artery, one of several coronary arteries.
- Multirole combat aircraft, the concept of an aircraft that can be used for more than one combat role; particularly:
  - The NATO Multi-Role Combat Aircraft – the project that became the Panavia Tornado
  - Indian MRCA competition, a competition to supply the Indian Air Force with 126 multirole combat aircraft
