= Indian MRCA competition =

Relay of contenders for the MMRCA (Medium Multi-Role Combat Aircraft) tender

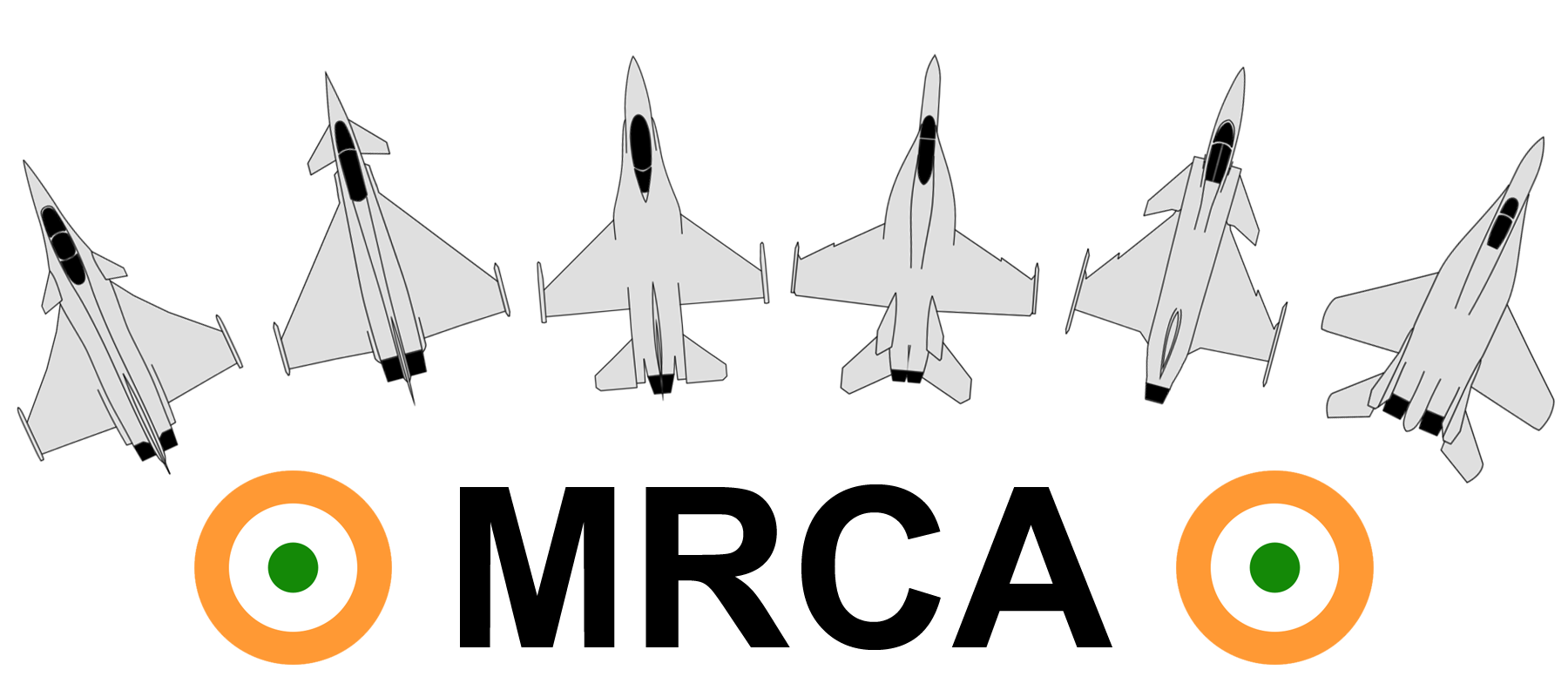
The six competing MRCA aircraft. (L-R): Rafale, Typhoon, F-16C/D, F/A-18E/F, JAS 39 Gripen, and MiG-35.

The Medium Multi-Role Combat Aircraft (MMRCA) competition in India, also known as the MRCA tender, was a competition to supply 126 multi-role combat aircraft to the Indian Air Force (IAF). The Defence Ministry had allocated ₹55,000 crore (US$5.9 billion) at 2008 prices for the purchase of these aircraft, making it India's single largest defence deal. The MMRCA tender was floated with the idea of filling the gap between its future Light Combat Aircraft and its in-service Sukhoi Su-30MKI air superiority fighter.

The contest featured six fighter aircraft: Boeing F/A-18E/F Super Hornet, Dassault Rafale, Eurofighter Typhoon, Lockheed Martin F-16, Mikoyan MiG-35, and Saab JAS 39 Gripen. On 27 April 2011, after an intensive and detailed technical evaluation by the IAF, it reduced the bidders to two fighters—Eurofighter Typhoon and Dassault Rafale. On 31 January 2012 it was announced that Dassault Rafale had won the competition due to its lower life-cycle cost. The deal had been reported to cost US$28–30 billion in 2014.

However, the deal stalled due to disagreements over production in India. Dassault refused to take responsibility for the 108 HAL-manufactured Rafales, as it had reservations about the ability of HAL to accommodate the complex manufacturing and technology transfers of the aircraft. Instead, Dassault said it would have to negotiate two separate production contracts by both companies. The Indian Defence Ministry instead wanted Dassault to be solely responsible for the sale and delivery of all 126 aircraft. In May 2013, The Times of India reported that negotiations were "back on track", with plans for the first 18 Rafales to be delivered in 2017. Another point of contention is a provision where Dassault was to reinvest 50 percent of the deal's earnings into India's defence sectors, either through purchases or technological expertise. In March 2014, the two sides were reported to have agreed that the first 18 aircraft would be delivered to India in flying condition and that the remaining 108 would be 70 percent built by HAL. In December 2014, it was reported that India and France expect to sign a contract by March 2015. On 13 April 2015, the defence minister Manohar Parrikar made an announcement that the M-MRCA tender is "effectively dead". India officially withdrew the 126-aircraft MMRCA tender on 30 July 2015.

On the joint press statement made by Prime Minister Narendra Modi's with President François Hollande, during his visit of France, the PM said that India will purchase 36 Rafales, This contract was finalised and all the 36 aircraft will arrive in India in flying condition. The agreed upon terms in April 2015 totaled US$8.8 billion for 36 airplanes costing $244 million each.

== Background ==
=== Indian Air Force summary ===
The Indian Air Force (IAF) is the air arm of the Armed Forces of India and has the primary responsibility of conducting aerial warfare, defending the Indian airspace, conducting strategic strikes inside enemy territory and providing aerial cover to ground troops. It is the fourth largest air force in the world, with a strength of more than 1,500 aircraft, including more than 750 combat aircraft.

=== IAF sanctioned fleet size ===
The minimum sanctioned strength of the IAF is 39.5 squadrons of combat aircraft, with a healthy level of 44 squadrons. However, this level was achieved only in the mid-1980s with the acquisition of the Mirage 2000s, MiG-29s and Jaguars. In addition, most IAF aircraft were comparatively new at the time, being less than 10 years old. Most of the older aircraft would have become obsolete by the mid-1990s, with the rest needing replacement by 2010. However, these aircraft were not replaced, which led to frequent crashes and attrition losses. Reduction in force levels and phasing out of aircraft have meant that the IAF operates only 30 fighter squadrons as of January 2014. Even with the planned MMRCA procurement, the IAF will reach sanctioned strength only by 2017.

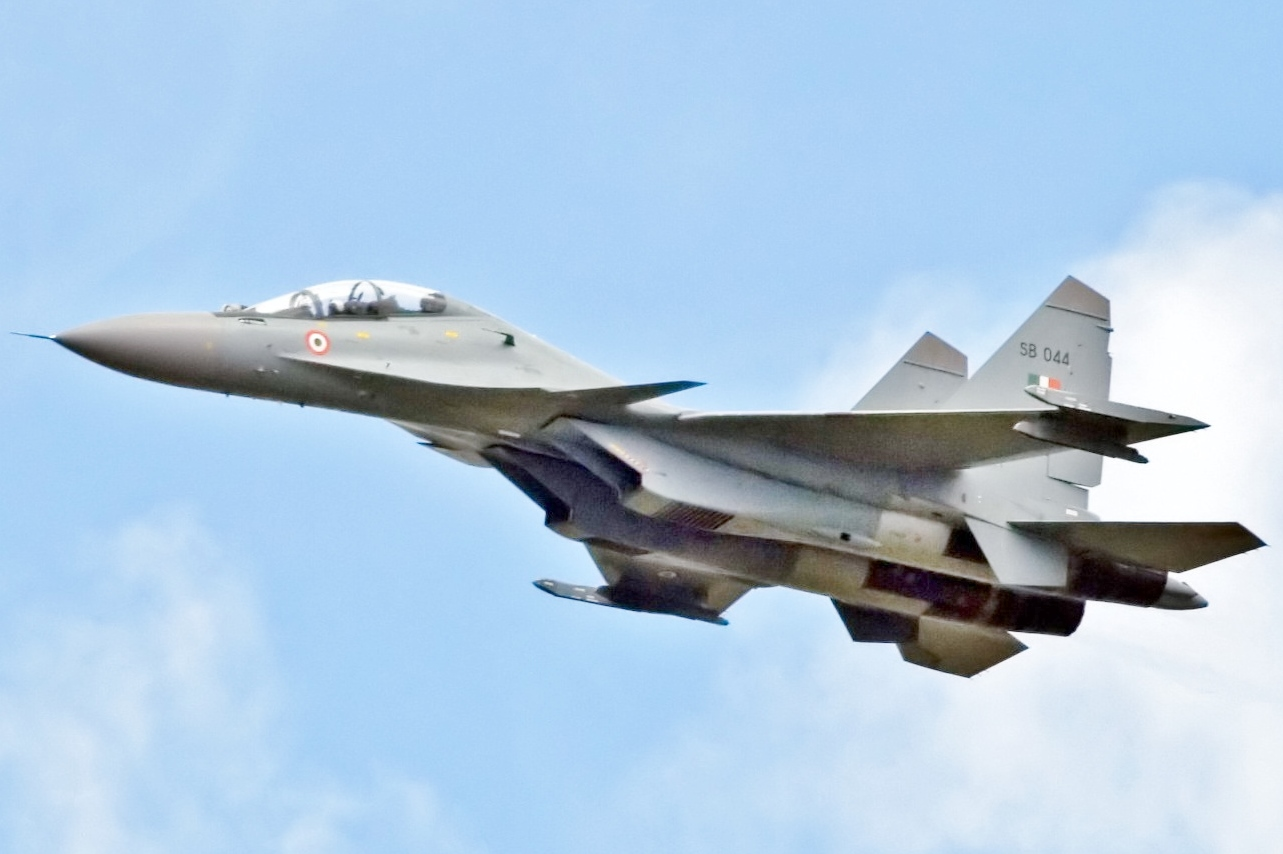
A Sukhoi Su-30MKI

=== Aging MiGs ===
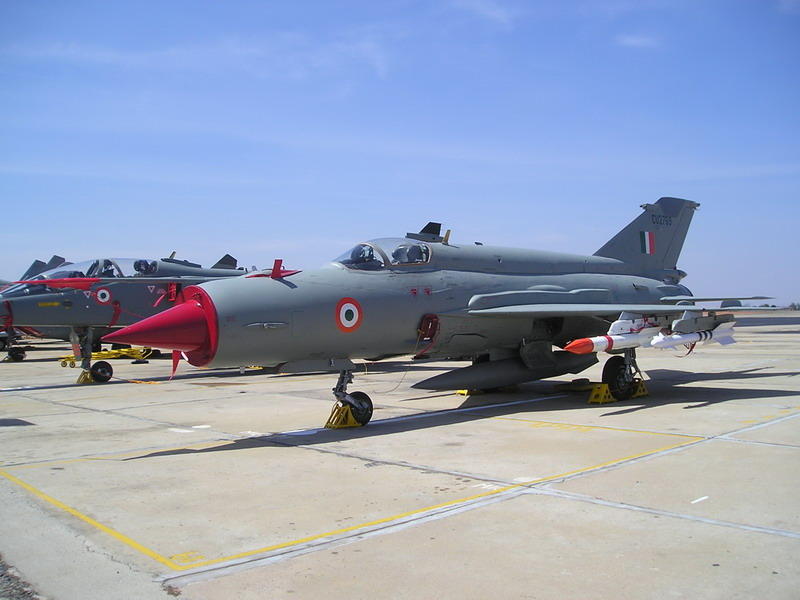
IAF MiG-21 Bison, the latest upgrade of IAF MiG-21s

Due to budgetary constraints—specifically, the economic problems in the early 1990s—the refurbishment of old planes and purchase of new ones was halted. Added to this was the disintegration of the Soviet Union, which led to severe shortage of aircraft spares, which rendered many of them unserviceable.

The attrition was stemmed to some extent by extensive upgrade programs on the MiG-21 (bis upgrade), MiG-27, Jaguar (DARIN I upgrade) and other aircraft in the mid-1990s. An aggressive program of upgrades was initiated. The MiG-21bis aircraft have been upgraded to MiG-21 Bison levels (125 aircraft will be upgraded to that standard), Jaguars to DARIN III standards, and Mirage 2000s and MiG-27s were also upgraded. The MiG-23MF air defence interceptor was phased out in 2007 by the IAF. Further retirements of MiG-23BN ground attack aircraft began in March 2009. With decreased aircraft squadrons level, MiG-23s are set to be replaced by MRCA winner.

== Requirements ==
The IAF projected a requirement for about 126 aircraft in 2001, when the strength was at 39.5 squadrons (down from 45). There is an option for an additional 74 aircraft. Initial requirements appeared to be for a 20-ton class fighter aircraft with the Mirage 2000 as the strongest contender. However, the 20-ton MTOW limit requirement was later removed. The IAF required replacements for its frontline strike aircraft like the MiG-27 and Jaguar, which were anticipated to retire by 2015. India's future 5th-generation aircraft, the Russo-Indian Sukhoi/HAL FGFA and the indigenous Medium Combat Aircraft at the time did not appear to be viable for induction anytime soon.

The Indian government is to buy the first 18 aircraft directly from the manufacturer. The remaining fighters will be built under license with a transfer of technology (ToT) by HAL.

The IAF was keen on buying the Mirage 2000–5, after it was impressed by the Mirage 2000's capabilities during the Kargil War. However, due to the upcoming manufacture of the Dassault Rafale and lack of orders, the Mirage production lines were to be closed down. French officials stated that they could be kept open if India had made a firm commitment. However, the Indian Government decided to go in for a multi-vendor tendering process. Requests for Information (RFI) were issued in 2004. The RFIs were initially sent to four vendors: Dassault (Mirage 2000-5 Mk.2), Lockheed Martin (F-16C/D), Mikoyan (MiG-29OVT), and Saab (JAS 39 Gripen).

Due to the tendering process and delay in issuing the RFIs, Dassault decided to remove the Mirage 2000-5 from the bidding process and enter the Rafale in its place. The MiG-35 was entered in place of the prototype MiG-29OVT. The Eurofighter consortium entered the Typhoon into the competition. The Boeing F/A-18E/F Super Hornet also joined the tendering.

== Bidders ==
Six aircraft were bid for the order – the Swedish Saab Gripen, Eurofighter Typhoon, French Dassault Rafale, Russian Mikoyan MiG-35, and the American F-16IN and F/A-18IN Super Hornet ("IN" are the proposed Indian versions). Previously, Mikoyan and Dassault have been regular suppliers of aircraft for the Indian Air Force and in terms of transfers of technology, licensed production in India, personnel training, supply of spare parts, maintenance, and upgrading.

=== Dassault Rafale ===
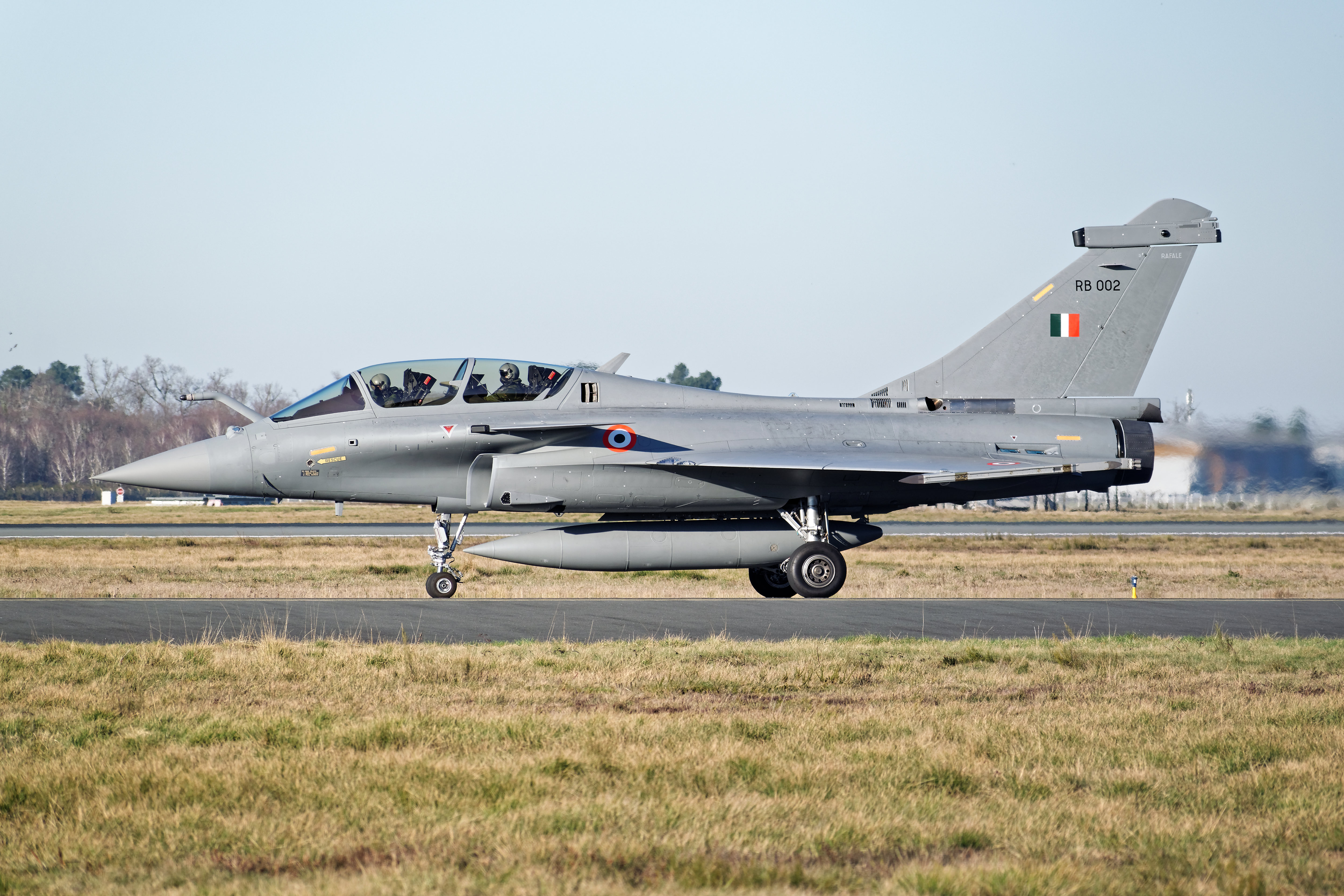
Dassault Rafale – the Winner of MRCA competition.

The Dassault Rafale is a French twin-engined delta-wing agile multi-role fighter aircraft designed and built by Dassault Aviation. The Rafale was brought in as the replacement for the Mirage 2000-5 that was originally a competitor for the tender, after the production lines for the Mirage closed down, as well as the entry of much more advanced aircraft into the competition.

The Rafale has the advantage of being logistically and operationally similar to the Mirage 2000, which the IAF already operated and used with great success during the Kargil War in Operation Safed Sagar. This would require fewer changes in the existing infrastructure of the IAF, which reduces costs. Moreover, being 100% French also provided Dassault a distinct edge over its competitors on the issue of technology transfer. Dassault claims that the Rafale has an advantage over many of the competitors because it is not subject to ITAR restrictions.

While not included in the MRCA requirement, the French fighter has more configurations of potential interest for the IAF: a carrier-based version (the Rafale M) and a capability for nuclear strategic strike. Both of these particular versions are in use in the French Armed Forces. At present however the Rafale M uses a catapult system (not present on the initial Vikrant) and the nuclear strike use is earmarked by others jets of the IAF. On 26 June 2012, it was revealed that the Rafale M (naval variant) could be used on a STOBAR aircraft carrier without any modification of the planes or installation of catapults on the flight deck.

The French government has cleared full technology transfer of the Rafale to India, including that of the RBE2-AA AESA radar which will be integrated into the Rafale by 2010 and also the transfer of software source code, which will allow Indian scientists to re-programme a radar or any sensitive equipment if needed. Without the software source code, the IAF would have to specify mission parameters to foreign manufacturers to enable configuration of their radar, seriously compromising security in the process.

Dassault has also offered to fit the GTX-35VS Kaveri engine into the Rafale, which if chosen, would greatly improve commonality with the HAL Tejas that will enter service into the IAF by 2010. Concerns have been raised about cost issues as well as potential sales to Pakistan, which has also expressed interest in the Rafale. However, no such jets have been sold to Pakistan. India and France have recently agreed to "go beyond a buyer-seller relationship". On 31 January 2012 Rafale was declared the winner of the MMRCA competition, beating Eurofighter Typhoon on cost.

=== Eurofighter Typhoon ===
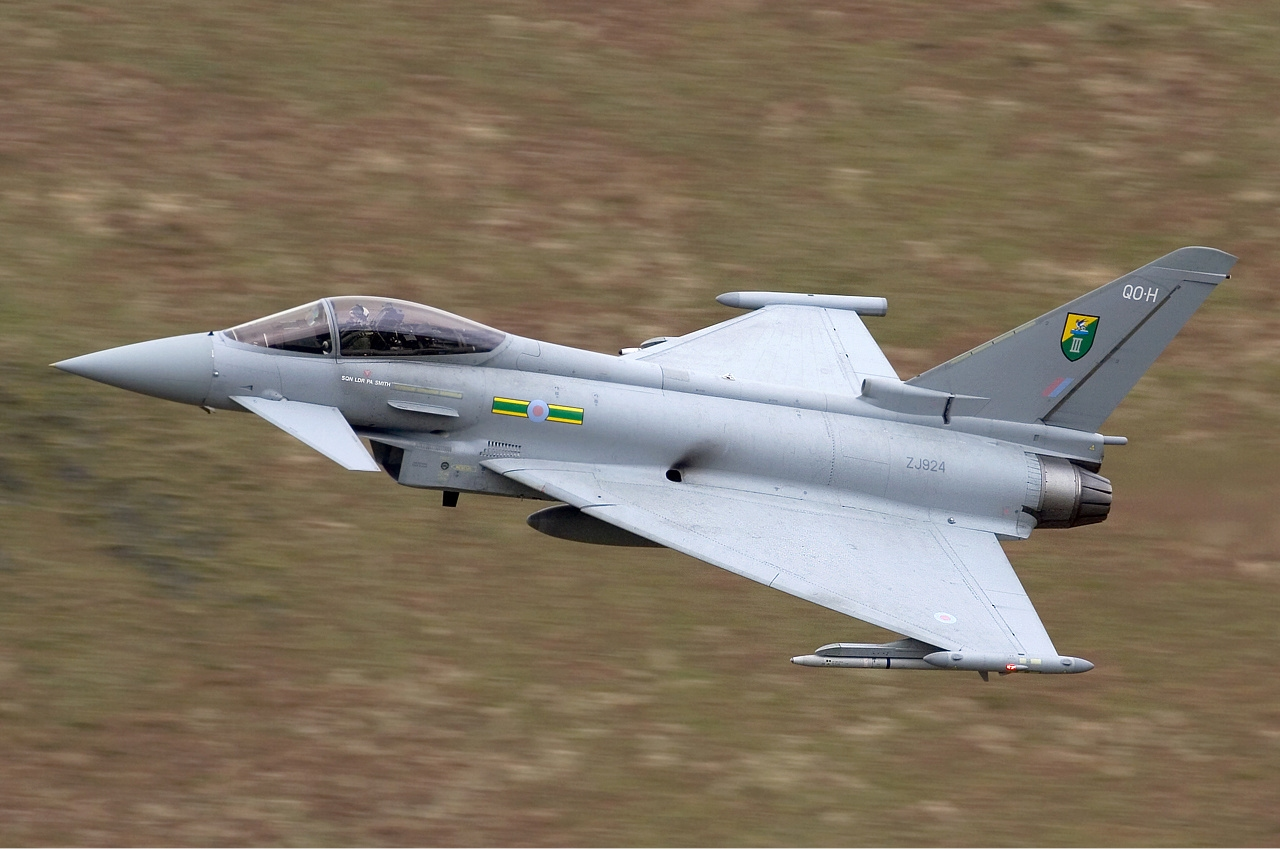
Eurofighter Typhoon

The Eurofighter Typhoon is a twin-engine multi-role canard-delta air superiority fighter aircraft, designed and built by a consortium of European aerospace manufacturers through Eurofighter GmbH.

Eurofighter is offering the Tranche-3 Typhoon for the Indian requirement, equipped with the CAESAR AESA radar. EADS has invited India to become a partner of the Eurofighter Typhoon programme if the Typhoon wins the contract, and will be given technological and development participation in future tranches of the Typhoon. Bernhard Gerwert, CEO of EADS Defense Department, elaborated that if India becomes the fifth partner of the Eurofighter programme, it will be able to manufacture assemblies for new Eurofighters.

In January 2010, EADS offered to include thrust vectoring nozzles (TVNs) with the Typhoon's EJ200 engines for India. Thrust vectoring will improve operational capabilities, and reduce fuel burn by up to 5% and increase thrust while supersonic cruising by 7%.

=== Boeing F/A-18E/F Super Hornet ===
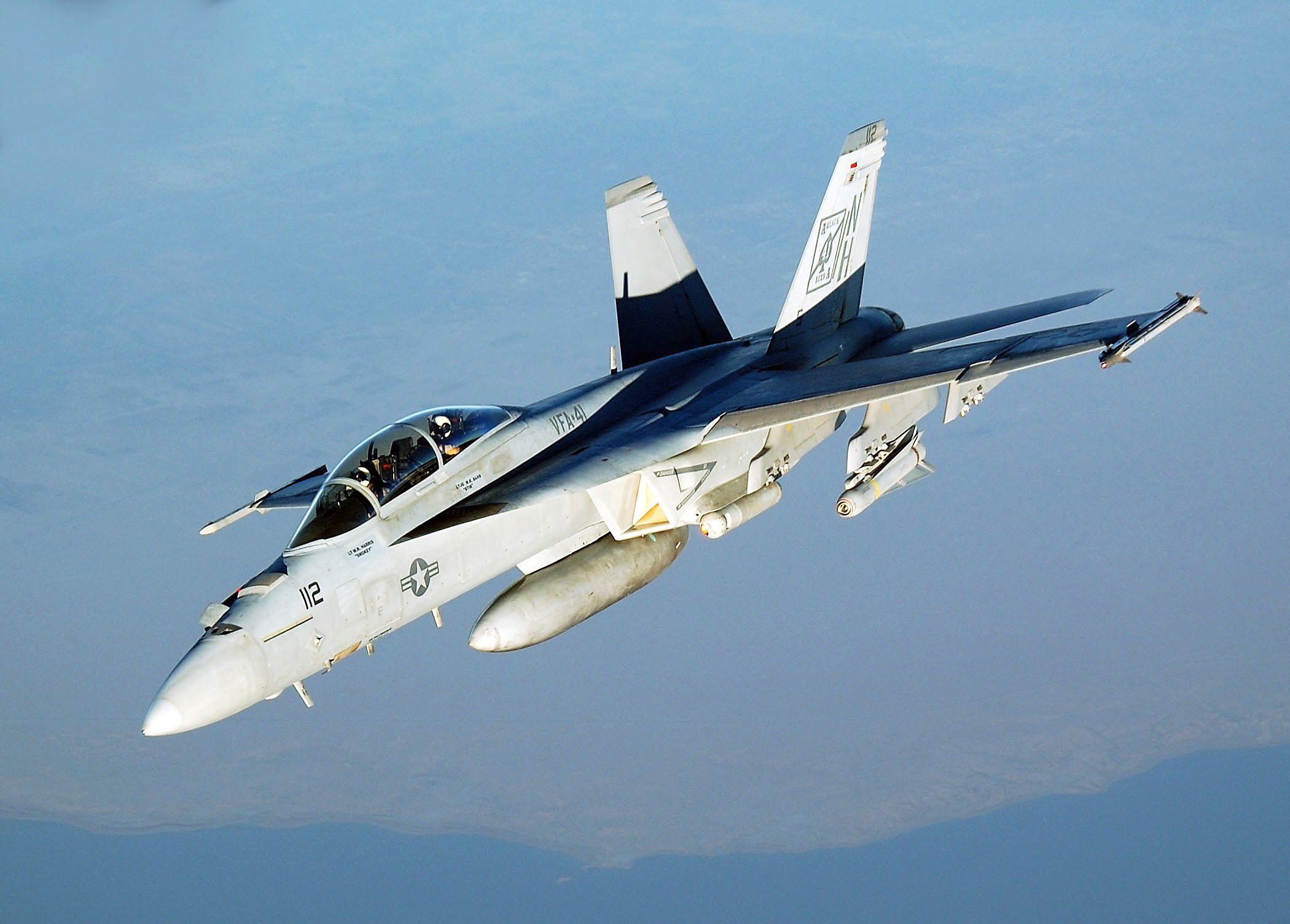
F/A-18F Super Hornet

The Boeing F/A-18E/F Super Hornet is a twin-engine carrier-based multirole fighter aircraft. The MMRCA contract represents a prime opportunity for US defence companies to gain a foothold in the Indian defence market, which is estimated to be about US$100 billion in the next 10 years. Initially, the Request for Information (RFI) was not issued to Boeing, which decided to field the Super Hornet. The US Government allowed Boeing to participate in the RFI, and later gave permission for the Request For Proposal (RFP). However, any sale of aircraft would have to be approved by the US Congress.

Initial reactions within the IAF were enthusiastic, although there were apprehensions of support issues in case of future sanctions. The US stated that there would have been some restrictions and pre-conditions for the purchase of the aircraft.

On 24 April 2008, Boeing submitted its 7,000-page proposal to the Ministry of Defence through the US Embassy in New Delhi, before the 28 April deadline for the submission for proposals. The Super Hornet variant being offered to India, the F/A-18IN, is based on the F/A-18E/F model operated by the US Navy and being built for the Royal Australian Air Force. Raytheon's APG-79 AESA radar was offered on the aircraft. There would have been limited Transfer of Technology on the radar, up to the level approved by the US Government. However, Raytheon stated that the level of ToT offered would be compliant with the RFP requirements. Delivery of the first F/A-18IN Super Hornets could have begun approximately 36 months after contract award.

Boeing proposed joint manufacture of the jets with Indian partners. It also planned to offset the cost by setting up a US$100 million maintenance and training hub in Nagpur. This is the first time the Super Hornet has been offered for production in a foreign country. On 14 February 2008, Boeing and Tata Industries agreed to form a joint-venture company. The new entity formed in February 2008, will supply components for Boeing military aircraft, including the Super Hornet.

In order to satisfy its offset requirements, Boeing has signed long-term partnership agreements with Hindustan Aeronautics Limited (HAL), Tata Industries, and Larsen & Toubro.

=== Lockheed Martin F-16IN Super Viper ===
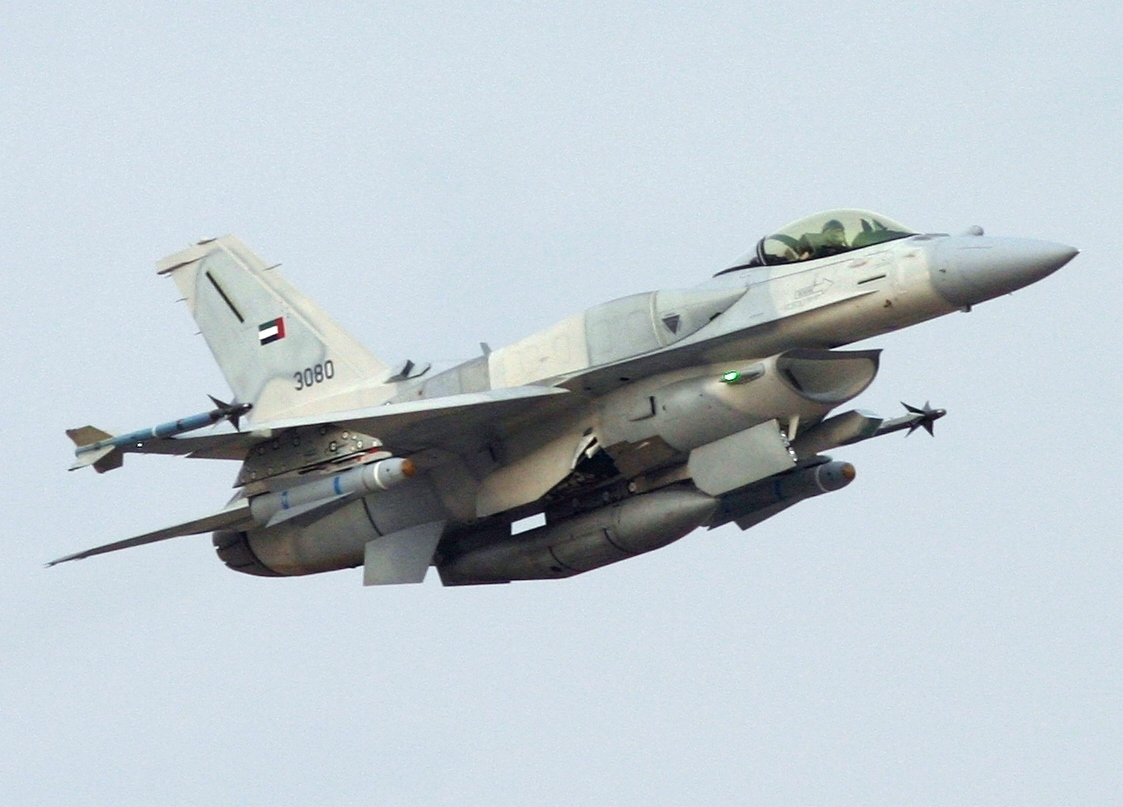
F-16 Block 60

India initially sent the RFI for a F-16C/D Block 52+ configuration aircraft. On 17 January 2008, Lockheed Martin offered a customized version of the F-16, the F-16IN Super Viper for the Indian MMRCA contract. The F-16IN, which is similar to the F-16 Block 60, will be a 4.5 generation aircraft. It will be more advanced than the F-16 Block 52s that the Pakistan Air Force has acquired.

Lockheed Martin described the F-16IN as "the most advanced and capable F-16 ever." Based closely on the F-16E/F Block 60 as supplied to the United Arab Emirates, the features on the F-16IN include:

- Conformal Fuel Tanks – This will give the F-16IN a combat range of 1700 km with 1500 kg weapons load.
- A Northrop Grumman AN/APG-80 Active Electronically Scanned Array radar. This is the same radar fitted on the UAE F-16 Block 60s.
- General Electric F110-132A engine with 143 kN full afterburning thrust with FADEC Controls.
- Electronic warfare suites and infra-red search ability.
- Advanced all-color glass cockpit.
- Helmet-mounted cueing system.

Lockheed Martin offered to sell India the F-35 Lightning II aircraft in the future, as replacements, if the F-16 was chosen.

=== Mikoyan MiG-35 ===
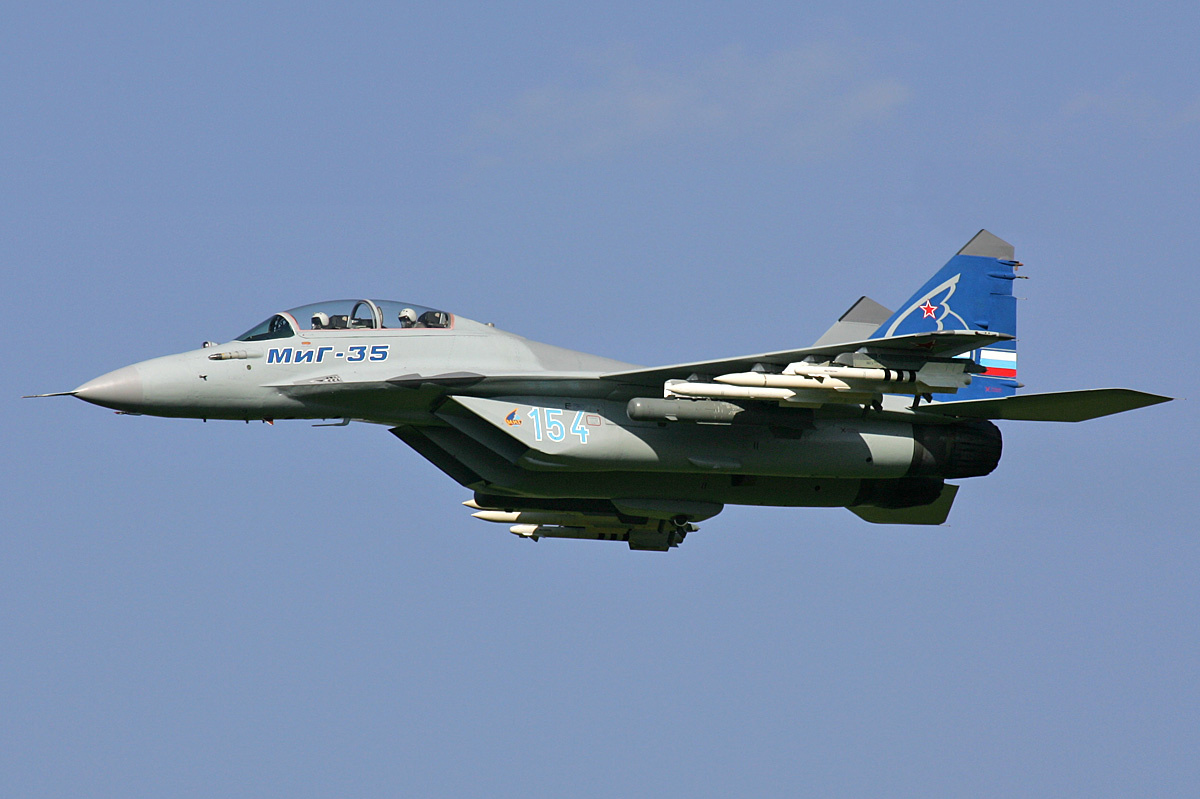
Mikoyan MiG-35

The Mikoyan MiG-35 (Russian: Микоян МиГ-35) (NATO reporting name Fulcrum-F) is the production version of the latest MiG-29 and incorporates mature development of the MiG-29M/M2 and MiG-29K/KUB technology, such as glass cockpit and fly-by-wire technology. The Indian Air Force already operates the MiG-29, and the Navy has ordered MiG-29K/KUBs for its INS Vikramaditya (formerly Admiral Gorshkov) and INS Vikrant-class aircraft carriers.

Russia unveiled the MiG-35 at Aero India 2007 in Bangalore, amid Moscow's keen interest to sell these planes to India. This was the first time that the final version of the MiG-35 was publicly displayed at an international air show, and thus generated a great deal of interest.

Since the IAF already has maintenance and upgrade facilities for the MiG-29, this would mean that the fighter could be brought into service with a minimum of expenditure on infrastructure. A major advantage of the MiG-35 is that Russia is committed to transfer the plane's technology, including the new advanced Zhuk Active Electronically Scanned Array radar, to India. In the past, Russia has provided customised versions of military equipment such as the Su-30MKI and continued to provide support for equipment during international sanctions. However, Russian product support, especially for the MiG-29 fleet has been inadequate.

Additionally, buying the MiG-35 would mean an almost total dependence on a single supplier for India's entire fighter fleet. Recent Russian demands for renegotiation of earlier contracts, the sale of RD-93 engines (a variant of the Klimov RD-33 powering India's MiG-29s) to Pakistan for its JF-17 Thunder aircraft and concurrently supplying combat aircraft to China has also caused concern in New Delhi.

=== Saab JAS 39 Gripen ===
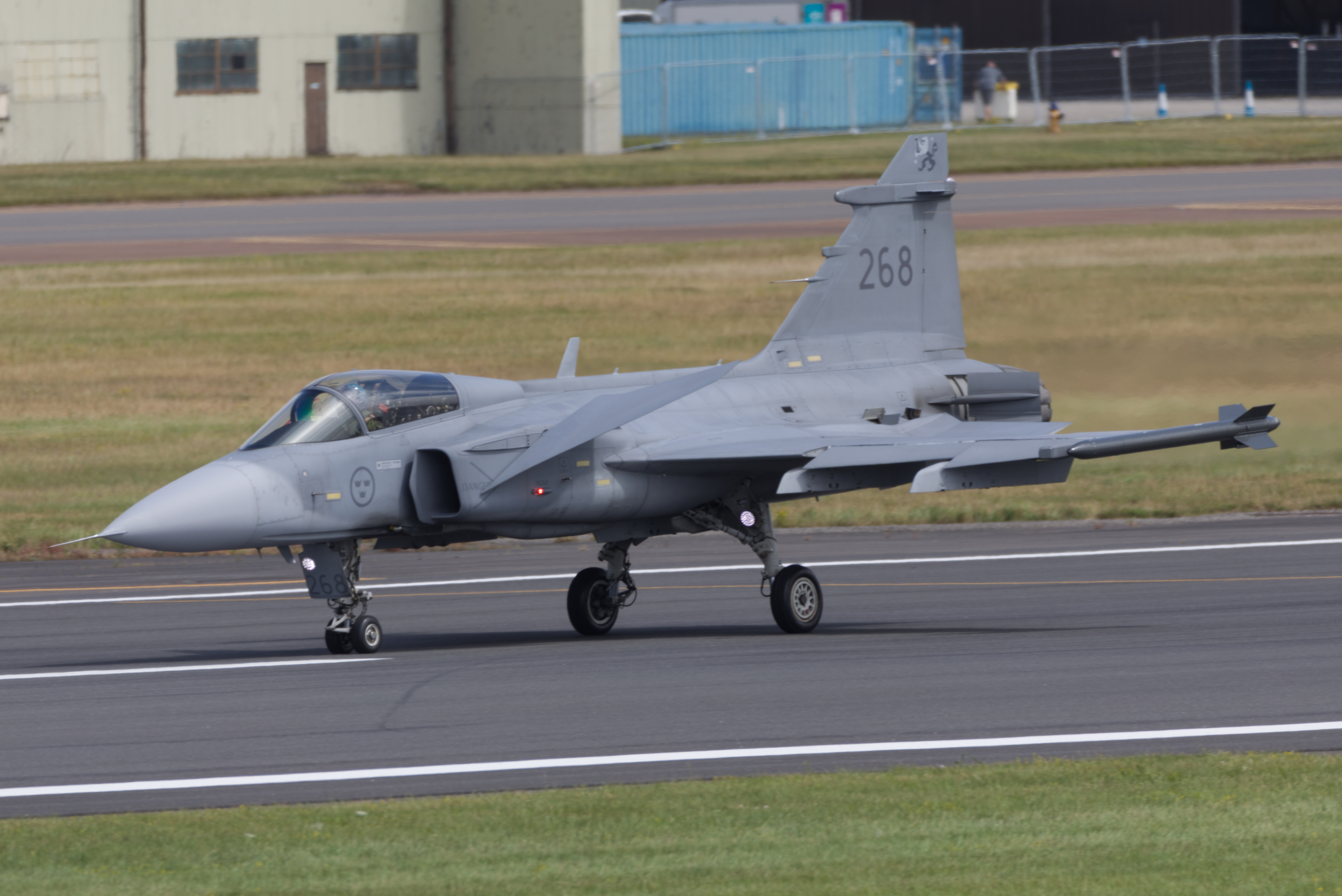
Saab JAS 39 Gripen

The Saab JAS 39 Gripen (Griffin or "Gryphon") is a fighter aircraft manufactured by the Swedish aerospace company Saab. The aircraft is in service with the Swedish, Czech, Hungarian, Brazilian, and the South African air forces. The Royal Thai Air Force has also received the aircraft.

The Gripen was one of the aircraft that the IAF sent the Request for Information. The Gripen participated at Aero India 2007, where one JAS 39C (single seater) and two JAS 39D (two-seater) variants were brought. Gripen International offered the Gripen IN, a version of the Gripen NG (Next Generation) for India's competition. The Gripen NG has increased fuel capacity, more powerful powerplant, higher payload, upgraded avionics and other improvements.

=== Comparison of the aircraft ===
Aircraft	Dassault Rafale	Eurofighter Typhoon	F-16IN "Super Viper"	F/A-18E/F Super Hornet	JAS 39 NG(IN)	MiG-35 Fulcrum-F
Country of origin	France	Germany; Italy; Spain; United Kingdom	United States	United States	Sweden	Russia
Manufacturer	Dassault Aviation	Eurofighter GmbH	Lockheed Martin	Boeing Defense, Space & Security	Saab	RAC-MiG
Length	15.30 m (50.1 ft)	15.96 m (52 ft 5 in)	15.03 m (49 ft 3 in)	18.31 m (60 ft 1¼ in)	15.2 m (49 ft 10 in)	17.3 m (56 ft 9 in)
Wingspan	10.90 m (35.7 ft)	10.95 m (35 ft 11 in)	10.0 m (32 ft 8 in)	13.62 m (44 ft 8½ in)	8.6 m (28 ft 3 in)	12 m (39 ft 4 in)
Height	5.30 m (17.3 ft)	5.28 m (17 ft 4 in)	5.09 m (16 ft 7 in)	4.88 m (16 ft)	4.5 m (14 ft 9 in)	4.7 m (15 ft 5 in)
Wing area	45.7 m^{2} (492 ft^{2})	50.0 m^{2} (538 ft^{2})	27.9 m^{2} (300 ft^{2})	46.5 m^{2} (500 ft^{2})	31.0 m^{2} (334 ft^{2})	38.0 m^{2} (409 ft^{2})
Empty weight	10,000 kg (22,046 lb)	11,000 kg (24,250 lb)	9,979 kg (22,000 lb)	14,552 kg (32,081 lb),	8,000 kg (17,600 lb)	11,000 kg (24,280 lb)
Maximum payload	9,500 kg (21,000 lb)	9,000 kg (19,800 lb)	7,800 kg (17,200 lb)	8,050 kg (17,750 lb)	5,300 kg (11,880 lb)	6,500 kg (14,330 lb)
Maximum takeoff weight (MTOW)	24,500 kg (54,013 lb)	23,500 kg (51,800 lb)	21,800 kg (48,000 lb)	29,937 kg (66,000 lb)	16,500 kg (36,400 lb)	24,500 kg (54,013 lb)
Powerplant	2× SNECMA M88-2	2× Eurojet EJ200	1× GE F110-132	2× GE F414-400	1× GE F414-GE-39E	2× Klimov RD-33MK
Thrust • Dry thrust	50 kN each (11,250 lbf)	60 kN each (13,500 lbf)	84 kN (19,000 lbf)	62.3 kN each (14,000 lbf)	62.3 kN (14,000 lbf)	47 kN each (10,600 lbf)
• Afterburner thrust:	75 kN each (17,000 lbf)	90 kN each (20,232 lbf)	144 kN (32,500 lbf)	98 kN each (22,000 lbf)	98 kN (22,000 lbf)	80 kN each (18,000 lbf)
Fuel • Internal • External	4,700 kg 7,500 kg	4,996 kg	3,265 kg 5,880 kg	F/A-18E: 6,780 kg, 5 tanks, total 7,381 kg	3,400 kg 3,655 kg	4,800 kg 4,200 kg
External stations**	14 (5 'wet')	13 (3 'wet')	11 (3 'wet')	11 (5 'wet')	10 (4 'wet')	9 (5 'wet')
Maximum speed • At sea level	Mach 1.8+ (Supercruise: Mach 1+)	Mach 2.0+ (Supercruise: Mach 1.2)	Mach 2.05; 800 KCAS	Mach 1.8	Mach 2.0+ (Supercruise: Mach 1.2)	Mach 2.25; Mach 1.2
Ferry range • Unrefueled: • Extl. tanks	3,700+ km	3,790 km	4,220 km	3,054 km	2,500 km 4,075 km	2,000 km 3,000 km with 3 drop tanks
Combat radius	1,800 km	1,390 km on air defence with 10-min loiter	550 km on a hi-lo-hi mission with six 1,000 lb (450 kg) bombs	722 km	1300 km with six AAMs + drop tanks, and 30 min on station	1000 km
Service ceiling	15,240 m (50,000 ft)	19,812 m (65,000 ft)	18,000 m (60,000 ft)	15,000 m (50,000 ft)	15,240 m (56,000 ft)	17,500 m (57,400 ft)
Rate of climb	305 m/s (60,000 ft/min)	315 m/s (62,000 ft/min)	254 m/s (50,000 ft/min)	228 m/s (44,882 ft/min)	N/A	330 m/s (65,000 ft/min)
Thrust/weight	1.13	1.18	1.1	0.93	1.18	1.1
Thrust vectoring	None	Thrust vector upgrade has been offered	None	None	None	May be fitted with thrust vectoring
Runway needed	400 metres (1,300 ft)	700 metres (2,300 ft)				
Unit cost	~US$84.48 million €64 million	~US$108 million €80 million as of 2009	US$50 million	US$55 million as of 2011	US$48 million	US$38.5 million
Notes	** = Wet stations					

== Order value ==
The order is for 126 aircraft with the option to buy another 64–74 more. While there were reports of the direct order being increased to 200, or split between two vendors, Former Chief of Air Staff of the IAF, Air Marshal S.P. Tyagi stated during Aero India 2007 that the number would remain the same, and would be sourced from a single vendor. The first squadron would be directly supplied by the vendor, while the rest would be manufactured under license in India by HAL.

The Government of India has sanctioned approximately ₹37,000 crore (US$4.0 billion), with reports that another US$2 billion might be added to this. This is indicative of the high importance of the order to the respective vendors. The total value of purchasing the aircraft is expected to be US$20 billion, with options for purchasing more aircraft.

=== Offset clause ===
The economic offset for the MMRCA tender was increased to 50% under the DPP 2006. The bidders must confirm the offset details in a separate proposal, to be submitted by 9 June 2008. This brings the value of offsets in the MMRCA deal to almost ₹25,000 crore (US$2.7 billion).

== Tender history ==
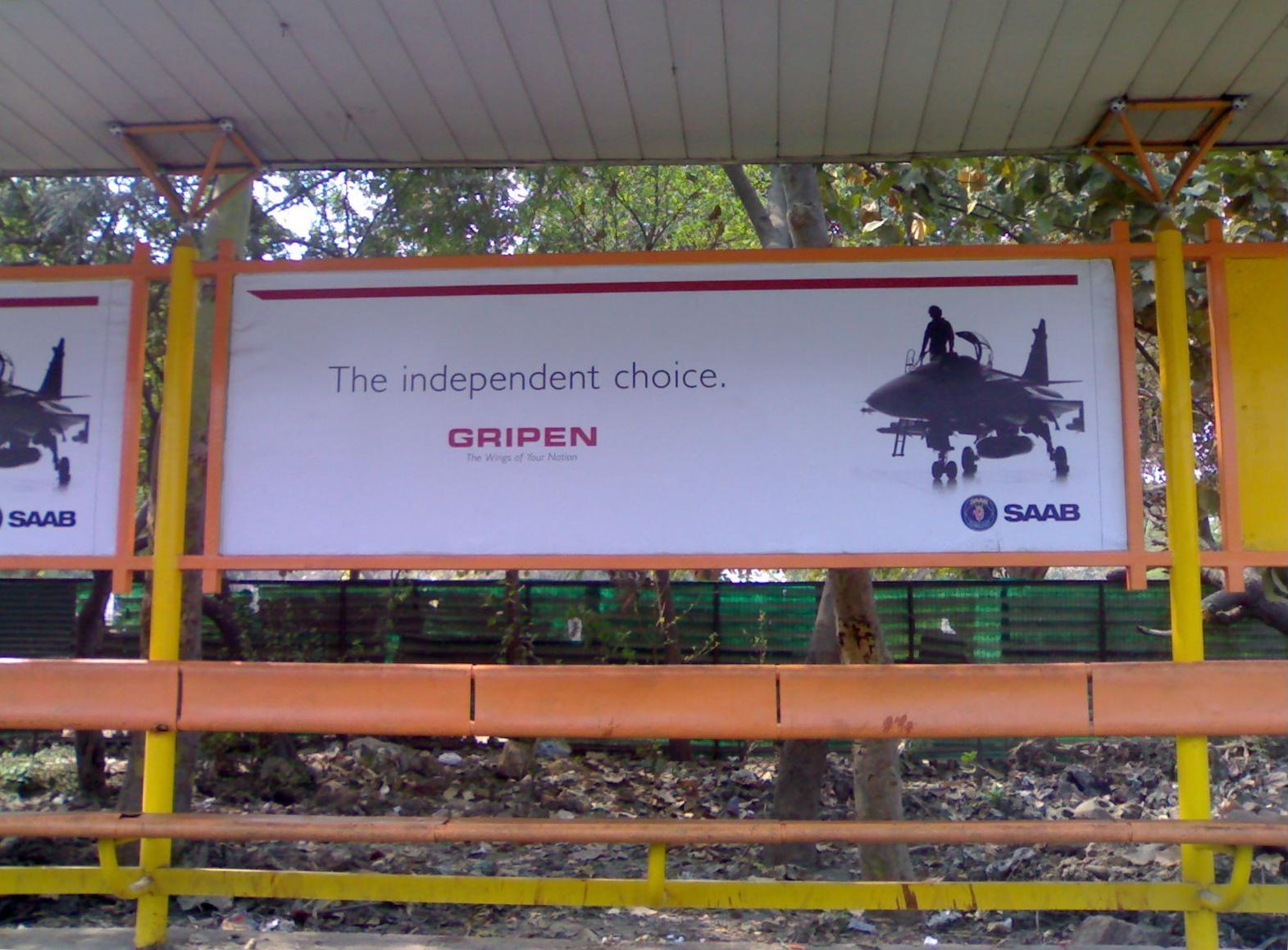
An advertisement for the Saab Gripen at a bus station in Central New Delhi in March 2008. The importance of the contract has led to hectic advertising and lobbying by the bidders. The bus stop in this image is located very close to major Government offices, Parliament and Indian Army and Indian Air Force Headquarters.

=== Request for proposal ===
The initial Request for Information (RFI) for the Multi-Role Combat Aircraft (MRCA) was put out in 2001. At that time the request for proposal (RFP) was expected to be issued in December 2005. Later the RFP was expected to be issued in June 2007. During Aero India 2007, Defence Minister A.K. Antony stated that the RFP would be issued by 31 March 2007. However, Air Marshal A.S. Tyagi, in his last press conference before he retired, had stated that there were delays in issuing the RFP. His successor, Air Marshal F.H. Major had said that the RFP would be issued by June. The delays were said to be due to new factors added into the RFP such as Total Life-cycle Costs as well as fine-tuning the Offset policy, under the new DPP 2005. The Total Life-cycle Cost has been introduced for the first time in Indian defence procurements, and has reportedly been a major source of the delay.

On 29 June, the Defence Acquisition Council (DAC), headed by the Defence Minister, cleared the process for the procurement of 126 aircraft. The 211-page RFP was approved for release to the respective bidders. On 28 August 2007, the RFP was released to the 6 bidding companies.

=== Tender process ===
The bidders had to give their Formal Proposals within six months from the release of the RFP, latest by 3 March 2008. However, some of the bidders asked for an extension of the deadline, citing complexity of the RFP. The deadline for submission of the proposals was then extended by a month. The Formal Proposals will have to be submitted by 28 April 2008. The Proposals will then be technically evaluated to check for compliance with IAF's requirements and other RFP conditions. After that, field trials will be carried out to evaluate the performance. Finally, the Commercial Proposal of the vendors, short-listed after technical and field evaluations, will be examined and compared, and a winner announced.

After the winner is chosen, there will be further rounds of negotiation to decide the final price, as well as sensor suite and aircraft configuration, along with other factors, like offsets and maintenance. The first squadron of 18 aircraft will come in a 'fly away' condition, while the remaining 108 will be manufactured in India under ToT.

=== Testing and evaluations ===
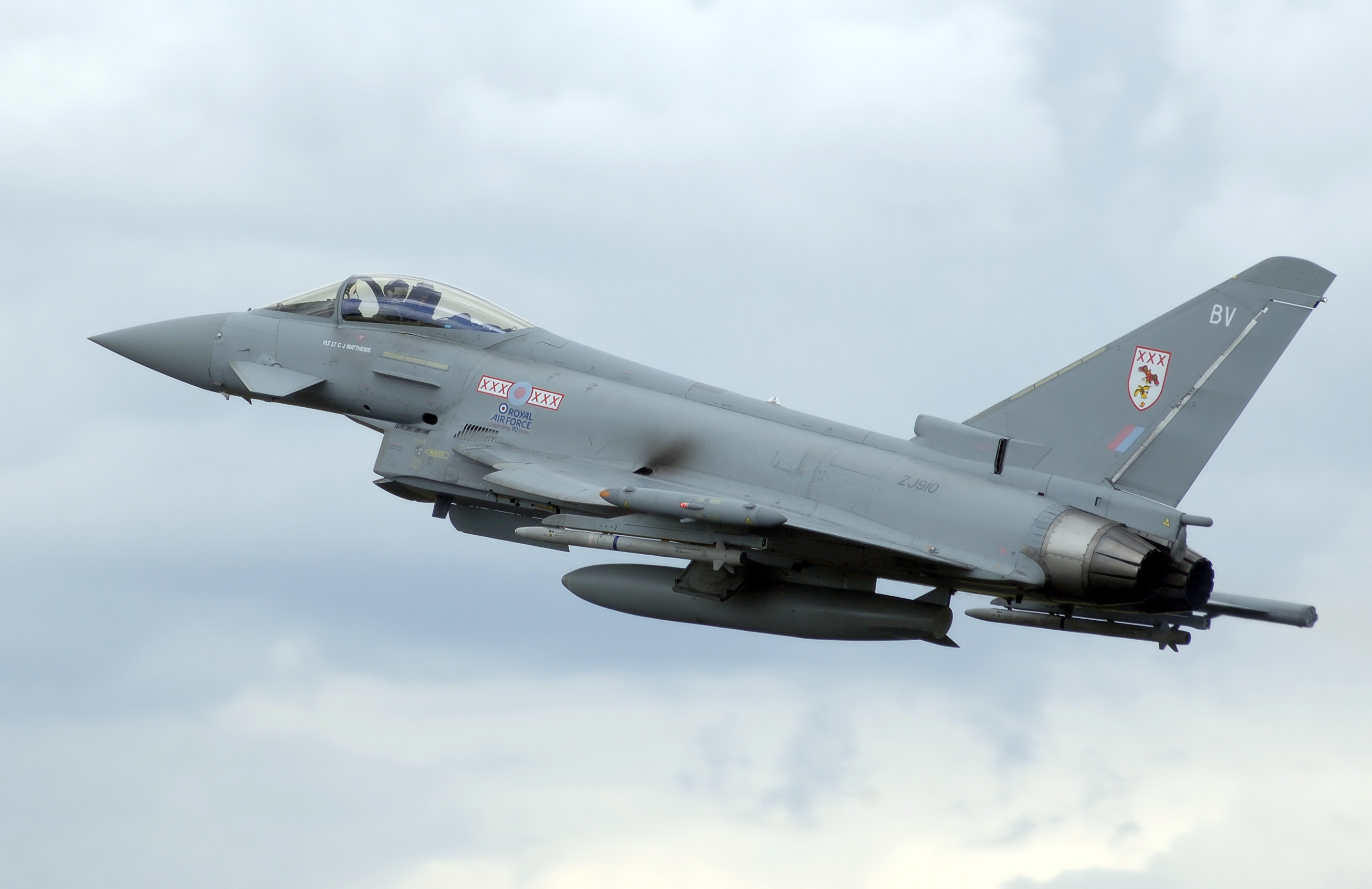
Typhoon

On 8 August 2008, the then IAF Chief Air Marshal Fali H. Major informed that technical evaluations were being conducted and claimed that the IAF is all set to conduct field trials of the MRCA bidding aircraft in the second half of 2008. The industry offset proposals from the bidders have been provided to India as of 11 August 2008. The technical evaluation of the medium multi-role combat aircraft (MMRCA) has been completed by 18 November 2008.

There have been concerns that this process would take a few years at least, and getting the aircraft after that would take longer. It is reasonable to expect that the aircraft can be delivered no sooner than 2011.

In January 2009 SAAB International, proposed to India the transfer of technology if Gripen win the MRCA and make India 'an independent manufacturer' of its own fighter jets. SAAB favored 'extensive transfer of technology' well in excess of 60% more than requirement of RFI to boost India's indigenous capabilities in fighter jets.

It was reported in April 2009 that Dassault Aviation's Rafale has been rejected after technical evaluation of the fighters. However, this has been disputed by IAF. In late May 2009 Times of India has reported that Dassault Aviation has submitted the missing answers to the General Staff Qualitative Requirements drawn up by the IAF, and after serious diplomatic intervention, they are back in the race.

On 27 May 2009 Indian Air Force completed the technical evaluation of all 6 fighter jets. Air chief marshal Fali H. Major told the press that the reports had been submitted to the ministry of defence. The aircraft will be put through a rigorous testing process at Bangalore, Jaisalmer and Leh. The aircraft will undergo technical and humid condition tests in Bangalore. Desert trials will be conducted in Jaisalmer, Rajasthan and High-altitude and mountainous condition trials will be conducted at Leh in Ladakh.

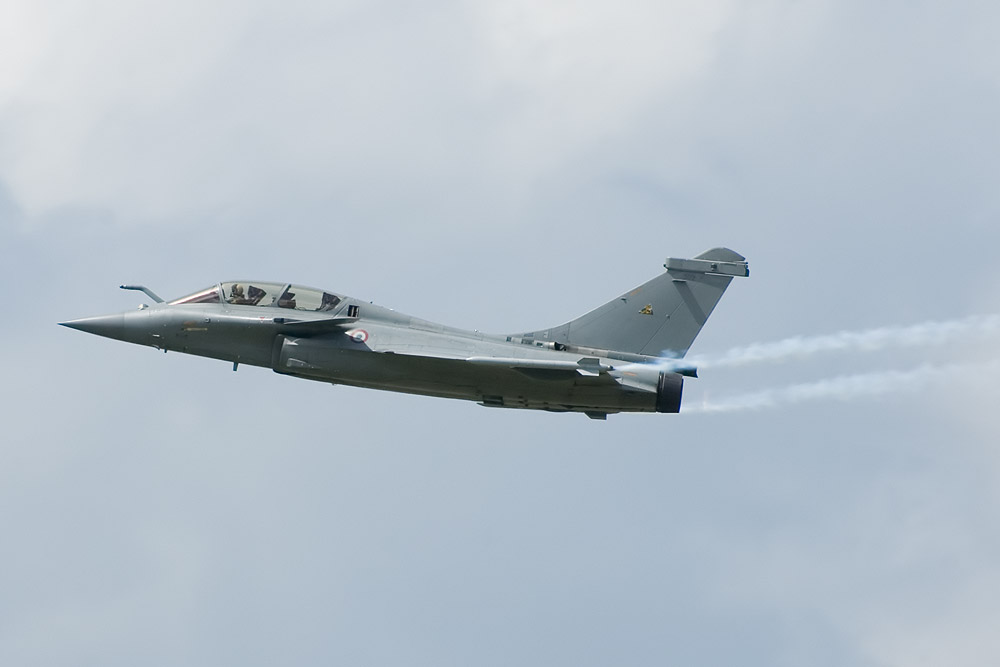
Rafale

Flight evaluation of the fighters started in August 2009 at Bangalore. The F/A-18E/F and F-16IN completed their field trials by mid-September 2009. The Rafale began trials in late September 2009. As of late October 2009, the IAF has completed the trials of F/A-18, F-16, Rafale, and MiG-35. According to Air Chief Marshal P.V. Naik, all the aircraft tested so far "are going neck and neck".

The Gripen was the last of the aircraft to be evaluated by the IAF. On 22 March, two Gripens left Bangalore, one to Jaisalmer and the other to Leh, Ladakh. At Jaisalmer AFS, a Gripen would undertake the hot weather trials and also a dummy run and bomb drop at the Pokhran Firing Range. The other Gripen headed towards Leh, would perform high altitude tests involving landing, refueling and restarting engines. Prior to the Gripen, 4 out of the 5 aircraft had issues restarting their engines during trials conducted in Leh. The Gripen completed its high altitude tests in Leh and other hot weather tests.

Updated bids were requested by the MOD in April 2010. The IAF was to complete an evaluation report on the six fighters in July 2010 and then begin to shortlist them based on the air force's evaluations. A report suggested Rafale and Typhoon were in the final stage. The Sunday Telegraph reported in November 2010 that the Eurofighter Typhoon was leading the competition on "technical terms". Now Indian government will take its strategic decision. On 18 December 2010, the IAF chief stated that the "evaluation of the fighters has been completed and the matter is now with the Ministry of Defence". He hoped a contract would be signed by July 2011.

=== Aircraft shortlisted ===
It was reported on 27 April 2011 that only Eurofighter Typhoon and Dassault Rafale made the cut to the shortlist. Eurofighter and Dassault have been told to keep their commercial bids open till 31 December 2011. The US ambassador in India, Timothy Roemer said that they were "deeply disappointed" by the news, but added that they were reviewing the documents received from the Government of India and were "respectful of the procurement process". He also said that the US looked forward to continuing to grow and develop their defence partnership with India. Officials from SAAB confirmed that the Gripen was not shortlisted but added that they were committed to the Indian market and continue their plans for growth and that they see large business opportunities in the aerospace, defence and security sectors in India.

A leaked US diplomatic cable has brought forward the fact that US diplomats already held the view that Indian defense trade, in such important deals with the US, will be subject to scrutiny, owing to the US maintaining a favorable military partnership with Pakistan and due to the sanctions that the US imposed on India after the Pokhran-II nuclear tests. Timothy Roemer, the US ambassador to India, said in a 29 October 2009 cable to Michele Flournoy, a top Pentagon official then about to visit India that "Our ability to seize the opportunities presented by this newly improved environment is limited by the commonly held view that the US will not prove to be a reliable supplier of defense equipment".

After entries from Lockheed Martin and Boeing were not short-listed, both companies requested a debrief to understand why their bids fell short in the technical evaluation. On 11 July 2011 representatives from Lockheed Martin and Boeing attended a government-to-government debriefing between Indian and US officials. The companies stated they accepted the IAF decision in releases. In late July 2011, the IAF said that the lowest bidder was to be determined in the "next five to six weeks".

The Air Force is not looking at price. That's not our area of concern. What we want is QRs are focussed on technical aspects, latest technology

— Air Marshal PK Barbora, Ex Vice Chief of Air Staff

On 9 October 2011, despite reports that a winner would be announced in October 2011, Air Chief Marshal Norman Anil Kumar Browne stated that India is first approving the finalists' industrial offset offers, and allowing each time to make a final bid. A total cost based on life-cycle cost, purchase cost, and technology transfer value for each competitor will be calculated. The two competing financial bids were formally opened on 4 November 2011.

French newspaper La Tribune reported on 12 January that the Eurofighter consortium seems to have submitted the lower bid.

=== Selection of the Rafale ===
On 31 January 2012, it was announced that the Dassault Rafale won the competition and has been selected for exclusive negotiations. The reasons given for selection included lower unit cost and lower overall lifecycle cost for the Rafale compared to the Eurofighter due to lower fuel consumption and simpler maintenance requirements. Some reports indicated that EADS may try to re-enter the bid with a lower price quote, but MoD sources ruled out re-entry; the Rafale's lifecycle cost per unit was about $40 million less than that of the Typhoon. MoD sources also indicated that the final value of MMRCA deal for 126 aircraft (After negotiations) was expected to be about $20–$25 billion.

Defense analysts also point out the operational performance of Rafale during the Libyan bombing campaign and in Afghanistan, the existing experience of the Indian Air Force in operating the French Mirage 2000H during the Kargil War and compatibility with Indian, Israeli, and Russian sub-systems as possible reasons. It was also noted that the recent decision to upgrade India's Mirage 2000H fighters will simplify the Indian Air Force's logistics chain. Historical reasons are also considered by analysts to be a potential reason as France was also the only Western nation not to impose sanctions after India tested five nuclear devices in 1998.

==== Reactions to selection ====
The decision was welcomed in France with the French President Nicolas Sarkozy, Minister of State for Foreign Trade Pierre Lellouche, and Dassault Aviation all issuing statements in support of the decision. Dassault Aviation shares soared more than 21 percent on the Paris Stock Exchange immediately after the news broke. Nicolas Sarkozy said the selection of Dassault's Rafale multi-role fighter "goes far beyond the company that makes them, far beyond aerospace – it is a vote of confidence in the entire French economy." The office of the French President issued a statement:

The President of the French Republic has learned of India's selection of the Rafale for the acquisition by the Indian Air Force of 126 fighter aircraft. France is pleased with the Indian government's decision to select the French aircraft to enter into exclusive negotiations with Dassault. This announcement comes at the end of a very high-level, fair and transparent competition involving two European finalists.

The Rafale has been selected thanks to the aircraft's competitive life-cycle costs, after the April 2011 pre-selection on the basis of its top-level operational performance. The negotiation of the contract will begin very soon and has the full support of the French authorities. It will include important technology transfers guaranteed by the French government.

The realization of the Rafale project will illustrate the depth and scale of the strategic partnership between France and India.

Dassault Aviation also released a statement claiming that following the announcement of the final selection of the Rafale in the frame of the MMRCA program, Dassault Aviation and its partners are honored and grateful to the Indian Government and the people of India to be given the opportunity to extend their long-lasting cooperation. Dassault Aviation also stated that they reiterate their commitment to meet the operational requirements of the Indian Air Force and underline their pride in contributing to India's defence for over half a century. The French Minister of State for Foreign Trade Pierre Lellouche called the selection as a positive sign for the struggling French economy but he later cautioned that a number of things remained to be finalized: "I confirm that we are in a very positive phase for the Rafale in India. ... At this stage we have to remain prudent; we are in a phase of exclusive negotiations. We have won the contract but there a number of things to finalize so let's be cautious for now". He also stated that he hoped that the order will finally open up real perspectives for the Rafale programme and referring to the lobbying done by the American, Russian and British governments, added that the political pressure applied by the competitors did not make things very easy.

Eurofighter issued a statement saying that although they are disappointed, they respect the decision: "India took the decision to select our competitor as the preferred bidder in the Medium Multi-Role Combat Aircraft (MMRCA) tender. Although this is not yet a contract signature and contract negotiations are still ahead, we are disappointed. However, we respect the decision of the Indian MoD. With the Eurofighter Typhoon, we offered the Indian Air Force the most modern combat aircraft available. Based on the Indian Government feedback, we will now carefully analyze and evaluate this situation together with our European Partner Companies and their respective Governments." Officials at the British High Commission in Delhi also said they were disappointed with the decision but added that it was expressly said this was about the cost of the contract, not a reflection on the health of bilateral relations between India and the countries.

After the announcement of Dassault Rafale as the L1 bidder, the Eurofighter Consortium also decided to lower the price of the Typhoon jets to stay in the race. This decision came after extensive discussion amongst the member nations. However, the Indian MoD officials ruled out any possibility of a comeback by the Eurofighter Typhoon in the competition. According to them, Dassault Rafale beat the Typhoon by a huge margin in terms of life cycle costs as well as direct acquisition costs. In March 2012 UK defense minister Gerald Howarth told the British House of Commons that the Eurofighter Consortium respects the Indian government's decision but stands ready to enter further negotiations if possible.

=== Contract negotiations ===
==== Initial negotiations ====
Though a letter of intent (LoI) has been issued to Dassault, contract negotiations must be completed. Indian Defence Minister A K Antony confirmed that the contract was not expected to be signed until after March 2012. A total of 126 Rafale fighters are to be supplied; Dassault Aviation is to build the initial batch of 18, with the remaining aircraft produced by HAL in India.

It has been speculated that at a later stage, India's order may include a further 64 aircraft to equip three squadrons. Some Indian politicians have questioned the aircraft's performance, notably precision bombing, in Opération Harmattan during the Libyan Civil War and have alleged "manipulation in the evaluation process." In response to these concerns, an independent investigation concluded that the evaluation was conducted according to the RFP terms and defence procurement procedures.

In February 2012, Dassault Aviation and Reliance Industries Ltd (RIL) formed a joint venture for joint opportunities in the defence sector and cooperation in the execution of the MMRCA deal. The partnership provides Dassault with a substantial opportunity to fulfill its offset responsibilities under the contract. Dassault wanted RIL to be the main partner in production of the aircraft, but the Indian government refused to allow that as the tender for the procurement had already specified that Hindustan Aeronautics would be the lead integrator. The differences were resolved when Dassault agreed to the Indian government's condition. Dassault will now help Reliance create a ₹1,500 crore (US$160 million) factory in Bangalore, similar to its production facilities in France, to produce the wings of aircraft.

Indian Air Force chief Air Chief Marshal N A K Browne went on a four-day tour of France from 21 May 2012. The tour was to include a visit to a French Rafale squadron and see Rafale's production facilities at Merignac. He would also meet the French Chief of Defence Staff Admiral Edouard Guillaud and his French Air force counterpart General Jean-Paul Palomeros to discuss the ongoing defence cooperation between India and France.

==== Delays ====
In September 2012, India media outlets suggested cost escalation and contract delays are likely. The Indian Air Force expected to complete negotiations and sign the contract by the end of the fiscal year, in March 2013. However, in 2013, Indian Minister of External Affairs, Salman Khurshid said that the contract was taking longer than expected to finalize. EADS on the other hand is still hopeful of the contract given the delay in signing the contract. It is said that the deal came up during the visit of British prime minister to India in February 2013.

In January 2014, the cost of the aircraft had reportedly escalated by 100% to no less than US$28–30 billion. The cost of the program was projected at US$12 billion (Rs42,000 crore) in 2007. The cost increased to US$18 billion (Rs90,000 crore) in January 2012 when the lowest bidder was declared. In February 2014, it was reported that contract had not been signed due to the department's budget had been spent for the year, but that it was expected to be signed in the next fiscal year, not before six months after the new government takes charge after the elections. In March 2014, the two sides were reported to have agreed that the first 18 aircraft would be delivered to India in flying condition and that the remaining 108 would be 70% built by HAL.

In June 2014, following the Indian general elections, it was reported the contract negotiations had stalled, as neither Dassault Aviation nor HAL, which would produce the Rafale in India, were willing to issue written guarantees on delivery schedules, a condition which the MoD insisted upon before signing the contract for the aircraft. Owing to the continued deadlock over the Rafale negotiations, it was reported that both Eurofighter and Saab remained hopeful their bids could be reconsidered. Saab had also submitted a proposal to co-develop the HAL Tejas Mk. II LCA with the Defence Research and Developments Organisation(DRDO), thus reducing the need to induct the Rafale; however, a spokesman for the DRDO said foreign assistance with the Tejas Mk. II project was not needed, as the work was progressing satisfactorily.

On an official visit to India at the start of July 2014, Laurent Fabius, the Foreign Minister of France, said discussions were "developing in [a] very positive way" and that he was "very confident about the final outcome." It was also noted that of the four committees set up by the MoD to review the Rafale project, three had replied positively about inducting the aircraft, but that the recommendation of the fourth committee, which dealt with pricing and costs, would be crucial for the government's final decision. Analysts also noted that it was vital for the technology element of the project to also be transferred to India. During the visit there was speculation that the MoD was considering reducing the order from 126 to 80 aircraft due to the escalating costs of the deal. During an official visit from 6–8 July 2014, the British Foreign Secretary William Hague said he had discussed the Rafale contract and the Eurofighter, among other issues, with Sushma Swaraj, the new Indian Minister of External Affairs. "Of course, we have always had a strong belief in the capabilities of the Eurofighter and its potential. It is always available to those countries that are able and willing to purchase it", Hague told reporters. Germany also expressed support for the Eurofighter to be reconsidered, and the US lobby said re-evaluating the American candidates in the MMRCA competition would "set the right tone" for a September visit to the US by the new Prime Minister Narendra Modi.

By 14 July 2014, it was reported another meeting of a sub-committee of the contract negotiation committee had been scheduled for later that week in Bangalore, with MoD, Air Force, Dassault, DRDO and HAL representatives to be in attendance. It was reported the contract negotiations had finally reached the stage where they could be finalised in the upcoming three months, after which the Cabinet Committee on Security (CCS) would review the approval process before the contract could be signed. According to a source, none of the previously eliminated candidates in the MMRCA competition could be officially re-evaluated. "There are only two possibilities. One, the deal is inked for the Rafale jets. Conversely, the entire MMRCA process is scrapped after being in the works for a decade, and a fresh global tender or RFP (request for proposal) is issued." On 16 July, it was reported the contract sub-committee would be negotiating final details in Bangalore from 17 to 19 July, leaving the way clear for finalising the contract. "We expect total closure of negotiations over Transfer of Technology (ToT) from this round. With that done, we will have completed negotiations by sub-committees on ToT, offsets and maintenance. What will remain will be the overall cost and there too, 75 per cent of the work has been completed, " a senior MoD official said. ACM Raha expressed his optimism, and said the negotiations for the Rafale "are progressing well" and the contract is likely "sooner than later in the current financial year (2014–15)." Raha said he expected the IAF to attain a strength of 42 squadrons by 2022, up from the current number of 34, which is well below desired strength. Raha expressed confidence that the induction of the Rafale and the HAL LCA would "arrest the drawdown in the strength of fighter squadrons ... [the] IAF is likely to have its sanctioned strength of combat squadrons operational sooner than later." Sources indicated the IAF believes that Contract Negotiation Committee (CNC) could complete the necessary work before December 2014, after which the Cabinet Committee on Security (CCS) will consult with the Finance Ministry before signing the contract. On 12 August, Arun Jaitley, the new Defence Minister of India, issued a statement that negotiations will continue as planned.

==== Continued delays and final negotiations ====
On 18 August 2014, a senior defence ministry official said a draft contract was being finalised and that the Cost Negotiations Committee was expected to file a final report shortly. Other ministry sources said the ministry was requesting Dassault to revise its pricing structure, as the estimated price had increased to ₹106,000 crore (US$11 billion) from the original estimate of ₹42,000 crore (US$4 billion) envisioned in 2007. On 2 September, the Chief of Air Staff, Air Chief Marshal Arup Raha, said the contract was expected to be signed "soon," and further stressed the importance of keeping the Rafale deal, by then estimated to cost ₹150,000 crore (US$16 billion). Although the Eurofighter consortium has made a counteroffer, by which India could purchase 126 discounted Typhoons, Raha dismissed any chance of the Typhoon being reconsidered. "It will not be appropriate to make any changes in the process. The current government has set the pace of work and things are moving fast enough on the fighter deal." Regarding the counteroffer, a senior defence ministry official said, "Rafale has run through the finish line. It's too late in the day to parachute into the race. The door is closed."

Despite efforts, negotiations had once again stalled by October 2014, due to disputes over final costs and technology transfers. According to official reports, Dassault remained unwilling to be held liable for the 108 Rafales to be manufactured under licence by HAL, and had expressed doubts the Indian defence industry had fully developed the capabilities to handle aspects of the sensitive technologies being supplied with the Rafale, including its electronically scanned AESA radar. Due to the protracted lack of progress over the final negotiations, a senior team of Dassault executives and French defence ministry officials were scheduled to visit India in November to expedite the process. The French ambassador to India, Francois Richier, expressed satisfaction with the progress of the negotiations, however, stating they were "progressing well ... moving in the right direction." A French diplomat further said "this is a very big contract, complex ... it takes time."

On 5 November 2014, Dassault Aviation CEO Eric Trappier said he expected the final contract would be signed by March 2015.

==== Change of Plan ====
Initially it was 18 Rafales that were to be built and sent to India in fly away conditions by France. But, on the joint press statement made by Prime Minister Narendra Modi's with President François Hollande, during his visit of France, the PM said that India will purchase 36 Rafales directly from France. And the contract is said to be sealed soon. There is some controversy surrounding the change in the original deal due to a shift in Indian leadership, which led to the transition of the deal to the private sector. It was handed over to a newly established entity, Reliance Defence Limited, which lacks previous expertise in this specific industry.

== Fate of the deal ==
On 31 July 2015, Defence Minister Manohar Parrikar stated in Rajya Sabha that the deal for 126 MMRCA was officially withdrawn by the government. On 23 September 2016, Indian Defence Minister Manohar Parrikar and his French counterpart Jean-Yves Le Drian signed the contract for the purchase of 36 off-the-shelf Rafales in a deal worth €7.8 billion with an option for 18 more at the same inflation-adjusted price. The deliveries were to begin in 2019 and complete by 2022. The deal includes weapons and spares; the aircraft will be equipped with Meteor BVRAAM missiles. Indian Air Force was handed over the first Rafale in October 2019. The first batch of 5 fighters arrived in India on 29 July 2020. As of January 2021, a total of 11 fighters have arrived in India from France. As of December 2022, all 36 Rafale are in service with Indian Air Force.

== MRFA ==
An RFI was issued by India in April 2018 for the procurement of around 110 multi-role combat aircraft for the Indian Air Force. Similar to the earlier MMRCA tender, the same six firms responded to the 2018 RFI by July 2018. The fresh tender is also referred as MMRCA 2.0 or MRFA (Multi-Role Fighter Aircraft) in the Indian media.

The six competitors in the competition, as of 2018, included:

- Boeing F/A-18E/F Super Hornet
- Dassault Rafale
- Eurofighter Typhoon
- Lockheed Martin F-21 (A variant of the F-16V with 14 customizations for Indian requirements)
- Mikoyan MiG-35
- Saab JAS-39 Gripen E/F
- Boeing F-15EX Eagle II (Planned)

In 2024, reports suggested that the Indian government will amend the "Make in India" policy so that all the fighter jets are manufactured in a production line in India itself. In October 2024, Saab offered to deliver the first Gripen aircraft within 3 years if the contract is awarded. They also offered full technology transfer.

As per a report on 29 October 2024 from Asian News International, the Indian Government has plans to release an open multi-vendor tender for the requirement of 114 units of 4.5 generation jet fighter for the Indian Air Force. The jets would have to be Made in India. This will act as a partial replacement of the soon to-be-retired jets like Jaguar, MiG-29 and Mirage 2000.

On 14 February 2025, multiple reports suggested that the Indian Air Force will seek bids from competing firms for the MRFA tender. Companies were reported to be preparing blueprints for supply chains and scouting for local production partners and re-evaluating their offer's cost effectiveness. Following is the tabulation of expected competitors and their offers.

Russia has offered India its Sukhoi Su-57E fifth-generation stealth fighter with production rights and critical technology transfer, proposing HAL's Nashik facility for assembly and a custom “Super-30” variant tailored for the IAF. Meanwhile, the U.S. has signaled a potential offer of the F-35 Lightning II to India, though no formal proposal has been made. President Donald Trump reportedly pitched the F-35 during Prime Minister Modi's state visit to Washington in February 2025.

The Empowered Committee for Capability Enhancement of IAF also recommended the MRFA acquisition programme in March 2025.

India's MRFA Fighter Jet Proposals (Integrated Summary – June 2025)
Aircraft	Country	Bidder / OEM	Indian Partner	Status & Notes	Ref.
4.5 generation jet fighter
Boeing F/A-18E/F Super Hornet	United States	Boeing	Mahindra Group	Carrier-capable twin-engine fighter. Previously in MRFA race; expected to be replaced by F-15E Strike Eagle.	
Boeing F-15EX Eagle II	United States	Boeing	Mahindra Group	Advanced version of the F-15. Replaces earlier F-15E offer. Might replace F/A-18E/F in Boeing's MRFA bid; due to the winding down of production of Super Hornet.	
Dassault Rafale	France	Dassault Aviation	None (Formerly tied-up with Reliance Industries)	36 units already inducted in IAF with a $7.4B deal signed for 26 Rafale M (naval variant) for Indian Navy. Dassault to set up independent maintenance base in India. Possible production with Dassault Reliance Aerospace after Dassault acquired a 51% stake in the venture.	
Eurofighter Typhoon	European Union	Eurofighter GmbH	—N/a	Not active in current MRFA bid. Previously evaluated by IAF; operated by NATO allies.	
Lockheed Martin F-21	United States	Lockheed Martin	Tata Advanced Systems	India-specific version of F-16V, replaces the 2008 F-16IN bid. Manufacturing ecosystem proposed with Tata in Hyderabad. Active MRFA bid.	
Mikoyan MiG-35	Russia	United Aircraft Corporation	—N/a	Previously offered; withdrawn in favor of Su-57E.	
Saab JAS-39 Gripen E/F	Sweden	Saab AB	(Previous deal with Adani Group lapsed)	Lightweight multirole fighter. 100% ToT and Indian missile integration proposed. Discussions for new partner underway.	
Fifth-generation fighters
Lockheed Martin F-35 Lightning II	United States	Lockheed Martin	—N/a	The F-35 Lightning II has been offered by the United States to India as a potential future multirole stealth fighter. As of August 2025, media reports indicated that the Indian government have rejected the F-35 in response the tariff laid out by US President Donald J Trump on India.	
Sukhoi Su-57	Russia	United Aircraft Corporation	Hindustan Aeronautics Limited	Replaces earlier MiG-35 offer. India-specific "Super-30" variant proposed with joint production at HAL Nashik.	

== Additional Rafale procurement ==
On 9 April 2025, ThePrint reported that the MRFA would be a government-to-government (G2G) deal of 114 Rafale jets for the Indian Air Force and negotiations would begin soon. On the same day, the Cabinet Committee on Security cleared the procurement of 26 Rafale-M jets for the Navy. While most of the jets will be manufactured domestically through Dassault's collaboration with an Indian counterpart, the initial batches of the jets will be delivered in fly away condition from France.

As of 11 August, IAF was actively pursuing the project to meet its urgent need amid depleting fighter strength. The IAF would soon submit a document to the Ministry of Defence for the procurement programme to obtain the Acceptance of Necessity (AoN) by the Defence Acquisition Council (DAC). The existing infrastructure installed at the home bases of Rafale squadrons — Hasimara and Ambala — is capable of accommodating at least one more squadron of the aircraft each.

The proposal document, officially the Statement of Case (SoC), was received by the Ministry of Defence in early September. The proposal was being considered by the Finance Division, chaired by Secretary (Defence Finance); after which it would be moved to the Defence Procurement Board, chaired by the Defence Secretary; and eventually to the Defence Acquisition Council, chaired by the Defence Minister. If approved, these jets might be integrated with long-range air-to-ground missiles. The deal had been moved to fast track procurement mode by 17 September and could be signed in the next year. These jets would likely be of F4.1 standard while IAF's existing F3-R standard jets, with 13 India-specific enhancements, is likely to be further upgraded to the latest standard. However, in October, the defence ministry had termed the Air Force proposal as "incomplete" and called for more talks with Dassault for the procurement. The ministry believed that much a higher indigenous content is possible in the warplane against the proposed 10-15%.

The Indian defence ministry is reportedly expected to move ahead with the project in January 2026. According to a report citing an air force official, an initial agreement had been reached about a 114-jet order to be built in India by a Dassault subsidiary.

The Indian Defence Ministry was expected to discuss the ₹3.25 lakh crore (€31 billion) procurement of 114 Rafale including 12–18 jets in fly away condition in the third week of January 2026. The jets would have an indigenous content of 30%. The inter-governmental deal would exclude the acquisition of source code. The next step in the project will be the approval of the SoC by the defence ministry. At least 80% of the quantity, about 90 aircraft, would be assembled in India. There are multiple non-negotiable clauses in the purchase proposal issued to Dassault. This includes a level of transfer of technology from Dassault, Thales and Safran; integration of Indian weapons, missiles and ammunition on all jets; as well as a secure data link for integration with IACCS.

On 16 January 2026, the Defence Procurement Board chaired by the Defence Secretary, Rajesh Kumar Singh, cleared the acquisition proposal. The proposal would then be taken up in early February at the Defence Acquisition Council (DAC) meeting chaired by the Defence Minister, Rajnath Singh. The final call is expected from the Prime Minister presided Cabinet Committee on Security (CCS).

As of 6 February, the DAC meeting is scheduled in the third week of the month. Of the jets, 88 will be single-seat variants while 26 will be twin-seat trainer variants. Further, Business Standard reported that the Indian Air Force will have "full unilateral authority" to integrate the weapons it chooses including Indian origin ones. The new jets will be of F4 standard and will be upgraded to the F5 standard when the latter's development is completed. The latter configuration will allow the fleet to remain validated beyond 2060 alongside loyal wingman. This reduces operational costs without the full access to the source code. One of the agenda for negotiations is improvement of the software-defined radio on the jet to improve network-centric warfare capabilities via the IACCS. Though commercial negotiations were yet to begin, the per aircraft cost is approximated to be $240 million. The indigenous content is expected to reach 55–60% with phased indigenisation.

The deal was granted the Acceptance of Necessity (AoN) by the DAC on 12 February 2026, ahead of the visit by the French president, Emmanuel Macron to India on 17–19 February. According to the proposal document cleared by the DAC, 18 fighters will be delivered in fly away condition from France and the remaining 96 will be manufactured in India with an indigenous content of over 25%. The fly away jets were not expected to arrive before 2032 as per an India Today article on 18 February while the Indian assembled jets are also expected to arrive by the same time. Though Dassault will reportedly integrate Astra Mark 1 and the Smart Anti-Airfield Weapon on Rafale, the IAF will still need to depend on the firm to integrate further weapons since the source code is not acquired.

According to Dassault CEO Éric Trappier in March 2026, if the order is placed, the firm will establish a second Rafale assembly line at Hyderabad with a target production rate yet to be decided. On the other hand, the indigenisation of these fighters is expected to be 50% by component numbers. The specific components that are to be localised will be decided during Dassault and Indian MoD's technical negotiations. By then, Safran CEO Olivier Andries had also confirmed their readiness to establish an assembly line in India for the M88 engine. The facility would also source components from Indian suppliers.

In April 2026, the request for proposal (RfP) was expected to be issued to Dassault Aviation by May. This would be followed by contract negotiations during which the government will ensure that indigenous weapons remain compatible with the aircraft. The transfer of the interface control document (ICD) will be insisted on by the Indian site during the negotiations. The plan is to “hardwire” ICD into the final contract.

The IAF had reportedly finalised the RfP as per a report by ThePrint on 14 May while the Indian Prime Minister, Narendra Modi and the Chief of the Air Staff, Air Chief Marshal A. P. Singh were expected to visit France in late and early June, respectively. The RfP proposed acquiring 22 jets, including twin seaters, in fly away condition and the rest of 92 to be manufactured locally through a partnership between Dassault Aviation and an Indian private sector company, the contents including Tata Advanced Systems, Mahindra and Adani Group. Further, the existing fleet of Rafale will be upgraded from F3-R to F4 standards. The RfP was in the final stage of bureaucratic processing and would be issued shortly. Thereafter, the French side would submit a bid, following which India’s defence ministry would form a price and contract negotiation committees. If the contract is signed by early 2027, the first fly away Rafale will arrive 2030 onwards.

Personnel from Indian companies were already undergoing training related to the Rafale programme with Dassault Aviation in France. After government audits and licensing, at least two Indian firms are expected to qualify for fighter aircraft manufacturing, following which Dassault will select its production partner. Existing licenses for projects like the Airbus C295 or Falcon business jets are separate from fighter jet manufacturing licences like for Rafale. Dassault and its eventual Indian partner are expected to form a joint venture for Rafale production in India. There are multiple options for the location of the manufacturing line.

As per a report on 1 June, the Acquisition Wing of the MoD issued the Letter of Request (LoR) in the last week of May. This marked the formal commencement of the acquisition project. The LoR is a formal government-to-government communication used to initiate defence procurement under the Intergovernmental Agreement (IGA) framework. The response from France was expected within two to three months and would include details like pricing, availability and logistical support. This would be followed by negotiations and agreement finalisation, all of which could be completed within a year. As per a 26 July report, the French government has sought time till mid-August to respond to the LoR. The technical and commercial negotiations would commence once a response is received. According to reports, 94 jets were proposed to be manufactured locally. The production rate at the Indian facility is expected to be 12 per annum.

The response to the LoR, the detailed technical and commercial proposal, was submitted by France on 29 July. The proposal is being examined by the Acquisition Wing and the Indian Air Force. According to ThePrint report, the proposal also includes a detailed partnership roadmap for the project — Dassault has proposed a joint final assembly line with Tata Advanced Systems; a partnership between Thales and Mahindra Group to collaborate on radar and avionics; MBDA is likely to partner with Larsen & Toubro for armaments; and Safran will partner with Hindustan Aeronautics Limited for the aero engine production. The major requirement were met by the proposal which is still under detailed evaluation. If there is no major clarification required, the procedure will directly skip to cost and contract negotiations. Since the France's proposed pricing falls within the DAC cleared budget of ₹3.25 lakh crore, officials aims to conclude the contract within this financial year.

On 1 October, India's Defence Secretary, Rajesh Kumar Singh, announced that the deal is expected to be signed by year-end. The French response is undergoing formal assessment, where they had agreed to integrate Indian weapons onboard Rafale jeta, including the Marine variants.

== See also ==
Parallel projects

- HAL Tejas
- HAL Tejas Mk2
- Advanced Medium Combat Aircraft
- Sukhoi/HAL FGFA
