= Sukhoi/HAL FGFA =

Fifth-generation fighter concept for the Indian Air Force

FGFA

General information
- Type: Stealth Multirole/air superiority fighter
- National origin: Russia / India
- Manufacturer: Hindustan Aeronautics Limited (intended)
- Designer: Sukhoi
- Status: Cancelled
- Primary user: Indian Air Force (intended)

History
- Developed from: Sukhoi Su-57

The Sukhoi/HAL Fifth Generation Fighter Aircraft (FGFA) was a fifth-generation fighter concept, based on the Russian Sukhoi Su-57, that was being developed by the joint forces of Sukhoi and HAL for the Indian Air Force. While the programme was earlier called FGFA, the combined project then referred as Prospective Multi-Role Fighter (PMF). The completed FGFA was to include a total of 43 improvements over the Su-57, including advanced sensors, networking and combat avionics. The Indian version would be a two-seater with pilot and co-pilot or weapon systems operator (WSO).

It was reported India withdrew from the FGFA programme in 2018, but also hinted that the project could be resumed at a later date, when the Su-57 is fully operational in the Russian Air Force first. However, General Director of United Aircraft Corporation Yuri Slyusar claimed that the FGFA program was not cancelled and India is still working with Russia regarding to the future aircraft. In October 2019, the Indian Air Force Chief of Air Staff RKS Bhadauria stated that the country will not be importing stealth fighters like the Su-57, and will instead focus on indigenous efforts such as the HAL AMCA.

== Development ==
Following the success of the BrahMos project, Russia and India agreed in early 2007 to jointly study and develop a Fifth Generation Fighter Aircraft (FGFA) programme.

On 11 September 2010, it was reported that India and Russia had agreed on a preliminary design contract, subject to Cabinet approval. In December 2010, a memorandum of understanding for preliminary design of the Indo-Russian fighter was reportedly signed between Hindustan Aeronautics Ltd (HAL), and Russian companies Rosoboronexport and Sukhoi.

While the Russian version will be a single-pilot fighter, the Indian variant will be based on its own operational doctrine which calls for greater radius of combat operations. The wings and control surfaces need to be reworked for the FGFA. By February 2009, as per Sukhoi General Director Mikhail Pogosyan, India will initially get the same PAK FA fighter of Russia and the only difference will be the software.

In 2010, a total of 500 aircraft were planned with options for further aircraft. Russian Air Force will have 200 single-seat and 50 twin-seat PAK FAs while Indian Air Force will get 166 single seated and 48 twin-seated FGFAs. Under the project terms, single-seat fighters will be assembled in Russia, while Hindustan Aeronautics will assemble two-seaters. HAL negotiated a 25% share of design and development work in the FGFA programme. HAL's work share will include critical software including the mission computer, navigation systems, most of the cockpit displays, the counter measure dispensing (CMD) systems and modifying Sukhoi's prototype into fighter as per the requirement of the Indian Air Force (IAF).

Sukhoi director Mikhail Pogosyan projected a market for 1,000 aircraft over the next four decades, 200 each for Russia and India and 600 for other countries in 2010. Russian Trade Minister Viktor Khristenko said that the aircraft are to be jointly developed and produced with India and both countries will "share benefits from selling the plane not only on their domestic markets, but also on the markets of third countries." The Editor-in-chief of Natsionalnaya Oborona, Igor Korotchenko, said in February 2013 that exports of the jointly designed fighter should help Russia increase its share of arms exports to the world.

=== Project changes and delays ===
In May 2012, the Indian Ministry of Defence (MoD) announced a two-year delay in the project's development. Ashok Nayak, who spoke on the record as HAL's chairman before retiring, explained that the IAF have required 40–45 improvements made from the PAK-FA to meet Indian needs. These changes were then formally agreed upon between India and Russia.

The Russian and Indian air forces each planned to purchase about 250 FGFAs, at an estimated $100 million per fighter for an $25 billion total, in addition to the development costs. By October 2012, India had cut its total purchase size from 200 to 144 aircraft. India's initial investment had grown from $5 billion to $6 billion, and the estimated total programme cost had grown to $30 billion in 2012.

In 2013, it was revealed that the Russian and Indian fighters would be using the same avionics. Alexander Fomin said that "Both sides involved in this project are investing a lot into it, and on equal terms." Russia later admitted to huge delays and cost overruns in the project. The contract has not been finalised, and the IAF has accused HAL of giving away up to half of India's share of the development work. India contributes 15% of the research and development work, but provides half the cost.

On 9 March 2015, media outlets reported that the countries agreed to reduce the aircraft delivery time from 92 months to 36 months with the signing of the final agreement. India is also ready to forego a 50:50 work share to prevent further delays from absorption of a new technology; both countries agreed to manufacture the first batch of aircraft in Russia and for subsequent batches to be manufactured by HAL.

By 2016, Indian interest in the project was fading after Russia cut back their own purchases. On 25 January 2016, it was reported that Russia and India have agreed to develop FGFA and lower investment cost to $4 billion for each nation. They will invest $1 billion in the first year and another $500 million per year for the following six years. In September 2016, the two nations announced a detailed work-share agreement for joint production.

In May 2017, another announcement came out regarding a "milestone" pact to finalise the detailed design for the fifth-generation fighter aircraft (FGFA) and move ahead with the multibillion-dollar co-development project. It is expected to be signed in the second half of the year. Then later that month the project appeared to be lost when the Russians suddenly demanded seven billion dollars that the Indians could not afford. An Indian committee has reportedly been set up to evaluate need for FGFA in light of the price increase and progress on the HAL AMCA project.

It has been reported that India and Russia are studying an upgrade to the Su-35 with stealth technology (similar to the F-15 Silent Eagle) as a more affordable alternative to the FGFA.

=== Major roadblocks in the programme ===
On 2 September 2017, the Indian Air Force cited demanding maintenance programs, and high maintenance costs as main reasons behind its reluctance to proceed with the project. India prefers to produce its own fifth-generation fighter to maintain parity with China's air force that has recently debuted the Chengdu J-20 stealth fighter.

On 20 April 2018, it was reported that India had left the project. India officials reported that they became increasingly disappointed with the project's progress after long years of negotiations, delays, and struggles with Russian contractors. They asserted that they were not satisfied with the capabilities of the Su-57, the foundation for FGFA's development, among many things the degree of low observability allowed by the design being the biggest of issues. However, Indian officials did not rule out the possibility of relaunching the FGFA project once the Su-57 is fully introduced into the Russian air force, or later acquiring the fully developed platform.

On 19 August 2018, it was reported that the FGFA program was not cancelled; the General Director of United Aircraft Corporation Yuri Slyusar denied the previous reports saying "the topic is not closed" and that Russia and India are still discussing the creation of the fifth-generation fighter.

On 9 July 2019, during a meeting with IAF representatives, Russia offered India to resume its participation in Su-57 program. Deputy Director of Russia’s Federal Service for Military and Technical Cooperation Vladimir Drozhzhin told that "Russia is open to that... We are ready and are proposing this program to our Indian partners". IAF Air Chief Marshall Birender Singh Dhanoa during an interview with Russian Ministry of Defense's official newspaper Krasnaya Zvezda (Red Star), stated that while Su-57 is currently not being considered for the IAF, but the combat aircraft can be evaluated once it joins active service with the Russian Air Force.

== Design ==
Russian expertise in titanium structures will be complemented by India's experience in composites like in the fuselage. Speaking to Flight International, United Aircraft chief Mikhail Pogosyan said India is giving engineering inputs covering latest airframe design, Hi-Tech software development and other systems.

By August 2014, the United Aircraft Corporation had completed the front end engineering design for the FGFA for which a contract had been signed with India's HAL in 2010.

=== Differences for FGFA ===
When complete, the FGFA would've been predominantly armed with weapons of Indian origin such as the Astra, a beyond-visual-range missile (BVR) developed by India. Although in keeping with the Russian BVR doctrine of using a variety of different missiles for versatility and unpredictability to countermeasures, the aircraft was expected to have compatibility with various missile types. It was reported, the FGFA would include systems developed by third parties. It was also to have a different AESA radar, designated N079.

The completed joint Indian/Russian versions of the operational fighters would've differed from the then flying prototypes through a total of 43 improvements.

Russia had agreed to the demand of the Indian Air Force that it must be a two-seater fighter. India had plans for it to be a two-seater with a pilot and weapon systems operator.

== See also ==
Related development

- HAL AMCA
- Sukhoi Su-57

Aircraft of comparable role, configuration, and era

- Chengdu J-20
- Lockheed Martin F-22 Raptor

Related lists

- List of fighter aircraft
- List of megaprojects, Aerospace
