= T. Suvarna Raju =

Former CEO of Hindustan Aeronautics Limited

Chairman and managing director of Hindustan Aeronautics Limited
- Incumbent
- Assumed office 2015

Member Secretary of Design Development Management Board Ministry of Defence (India)

Personal details
- Education: National Defence College (India)
- Website: hal-india.com

T. Suvarna Raju is the former chairman and managing director of Hindustan Aeronautics Limited which is an Indian Public Sector Undertaking under the Government of India.

== Biography ==
T. Suvarna Raju, took over as Chairman, HAL on 1 February 2015. He joined HAL in 1980 as Management Trainee and has worked in different capacities at HAL, before taking over as Director, Design & Development in 2012. He is also the first Member Secretary of Design Development Management Board established by Ministry of Defence (India).

== Development programmes ==
He was actively involved in the research and development programmes for the light combat aircraft the HAL Tejas, HAL HTT-40.
