= Ganesh–Vasanth =

- Created by: Sujatha

In-universe information
- Gender: Male
- Occupation: Lawyers
- Nationality: Indian

Ganesh–Vasanth are a duo appearing in Tamil-language crime thriller novels written by Sujatha. Ganesh, introduced in the 1968 novel Nylon Kayiru, is a level-headed senior advocate who is mainly accompanied by his flirtatious young junior assistant lawyer Vasanth, introduced in the 1973 sequel Priya.

== Duo pair ==
Ganesh is a level-headed, senior advocate while Vasanth is his flirtatious junior advocate. The Ganesh–Vasanth are based on James Hadley Chase's characters, Vic Malloy and his sidekick. Ganesh was initially assisted by a female assistant Niraja, but later on he was paired with Vasanth. The exact ages of Ganesh and Vasanth were not mentioned by the author. The ages of the duo are assumed to be in between late twenties and early thirties with Vasanth being few years younger to Ganesh. The marital status of the duo was also not mentioned in any of the novels. According to the last few interviews of the author in the early 2000s, Vasanth is still an eligible bachelor searching for a suitable bride for himself.

Ganesh is portrayed as a serious person while Vasanth is a jolly, social, yet intelligent man who lives as right-hand man to his boss Ganesh. Vasanth loves to flirt with women, trying to impress them, and he cracks adult jokes especially the famous mysterious and untold adult joke 'Mexico Salavaikkaari' (Mexican washerwoman), much against the likes of his senior. He is also shown as a brave guy who involves himself in dangerous stunts on his boss' instructions.

== Works ==
The duo appeared as solo and together in more than 25 novels many of which listed below:

=== Novels ===
1. Nylon Kayiru (Nylon Rope) – Ganesh in solo
2. Gayathri
3. Priya
4. Kolaiyuthir Kaalam (Autumn of Murders)
5. Aah
6. Pesum Bommaigal (Talking toys)
7. Ithan Peyarum Kolai (This is also called 'Murder')
8. Vasanth! Vasanth!
9. Marupadiyum Ganesh (Ganesh Again)
10. Marina
11. Nirvana Nagaram (Nude City)
12. Kolai Arangam (Murder Stage)
13. Iynthavathu Athiyayam (Fifth Chapter)
14. Aayirathil Iruvar (Two in a thousand)
15. Nillungal Rajavae (Please Stop! Raja)
16. Yedhaiyum Orumurai (Anything one time)
17. Odaathe! (Do not run)
18. Megathai Thurathiyavan (The one who chases the cloud) – Vasanth in solo
19. Maerkae Oru Kutram (A crime in the West)
20. Silviya

=== Short stories ===
1. "Maya"
2. "Maelum Oru Kutram" (Another crime)
3. "Meendum Oru Kutram" (Once again a crime)
4. "Vidhi" (Fate)
5. "Paathi Rajiyam" (Half of the Kingdom) – Ganesh in solo
6. "Oru Vibathin Anatomy" (An anatomy of an accident) – Ganesh in solo
7. "Malai Maaligai" (Mountain Palace)
8. "Modhamal Oru Nalum Irukka Vendam" (Do not stay a day without Confronting)
9. "Vibareetha Kotpadu"

== In other media ==
Ganesh is portrayed by Jaishankar and Rajinikanth in the films Gayathri (1977) and Priya (1978) respectively. In the Sun TV series Ganesh & Vasanth, the titular duo are portrayed by Suresh and Vijay Adhiraj. In the episode "Ganesh Vasanth" of the Star Vijay series Vijay Chithiram, the duo are portrayed by Adhiraj and Amit Kumar.

== Bibliography ==
- Ramachandran, Naman (2014) [2012]. Rajinikanth: The Definitive Biography. New Delhi: Penguin Books. ISBN 978-81-8475-796-5.
