= Mikoyan MiG-29K =

Carrier-based multirole combat aircraft

MiG-29K
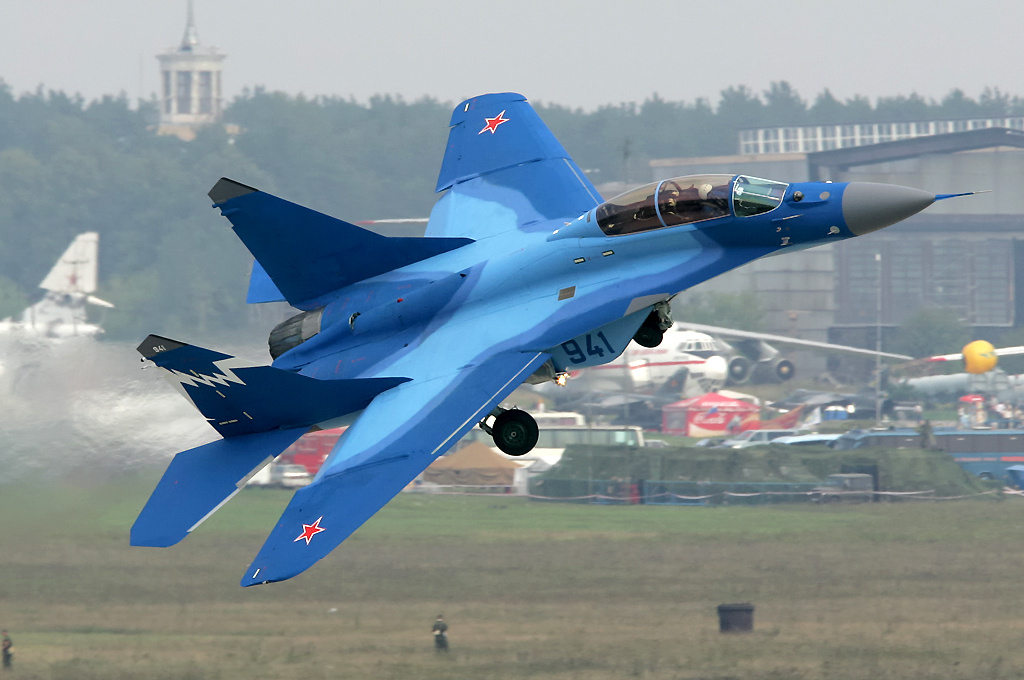
- A Russian MiG-29K at MAKS Air Show 2007

General information
- Type: All-weather carrier-based multirole fighter
- National origin: Soviet Union / Russia
- Manufacturer: Mikoyan
- Status: In service
- Primary users: Indian Navy Russian Navy

History
- Manufactured: 2005–2020
- Introduction date: 19 February 2010 (India)
- First flight: 23 July 1988; 38 years ago
- Developed from: MiG-29M
- Developed into: Mikoyan MiG-35

The Mikoyan MiG-29K (Russian: Микоян МиГ-29K; NATO reporting name: Fulcrum-D) is a Russian all-weather carrier-based multirole fighter aircraft developed by the Mikoyan Design Bureau. The MiG-29K was developed in the late 1980s from the MiG-29M. Mikoyan describes it as a 4+ generation aircraft.

The production standard MiG-29Ks differ from prototypes in features such as a multi-function radar and several new cockpit displays, the integration of RVV-AE (also known as R-77) air-to-air missiles, along with missiles for anti-ship and anti-radar operations, and several ground/strike precision-guided weapons.

In the early 1990s only two MiG-29K prototypes were built because the Russian Navy preferred the Su-27K (later re-designated Su-33). Mikoyan continued its MiG-29K development despite the lack of financing since 1992. The programme received a boost in the late 1990s with India's requirement for a ship-borne fighter following the purchase of a former Soviet aircraft carrier. India received its first MiG-29K by the Indian Naval Air Arm in 2009. The Russian Navy, with their Su-33s nearing the end of their service lives by 2010, has also ordered the MiG-29K as a replacement. The aircraft ceased production in 2020.

== Development ==
=== Origins ===
The MiG-29K project was initiated in the late 1970s when the Soviet Navy developed a requirement for a supersonic carrier-based fighter. As a first step to meet this requirement, the Mikoyan design bureau designed a "proof of concept" version of the MiG-29 fitted with a stronger undercarriage and a reinforced tail section with an arrestor hook, the MiG-29KVP (Korotkii Vzlet i Posadka, or "short take off and landing"). The KVP first flew on 21 August 1982, and was subject to extensive trials which demonstrated it could safely operate from a ski-jump, but ideally a production aircraft needed more power and greater wing area. It was decided to base the definitive naval version on the advanced MiG-29M (izdeliye "Product" 9.15) that was already under development, further modified with new undercarriage and folding wings of greater area, with the new model designated the MiG-29K (Korabelniy – "ship based") or Project 9–31. The MiG-29K differed considerably from the MiG-29 production model, featuring a new multi-function radar, dubbed Zhuk; a cockpit with monochrome display and use of the HOTAS (hands-on-throttle-and-stick) principle; the RVV-AE air-to-air active homing missiles; antiship and antiradar missiles; as well as air-to-ground precision-guided weapons. To protect the engine from foreign object damage (FOD), the engine inlets were fitted with retractable grills for air flow, rather than metal doors and leading-edge extension auxiliary intake louvres used by land-based MiG-29s.

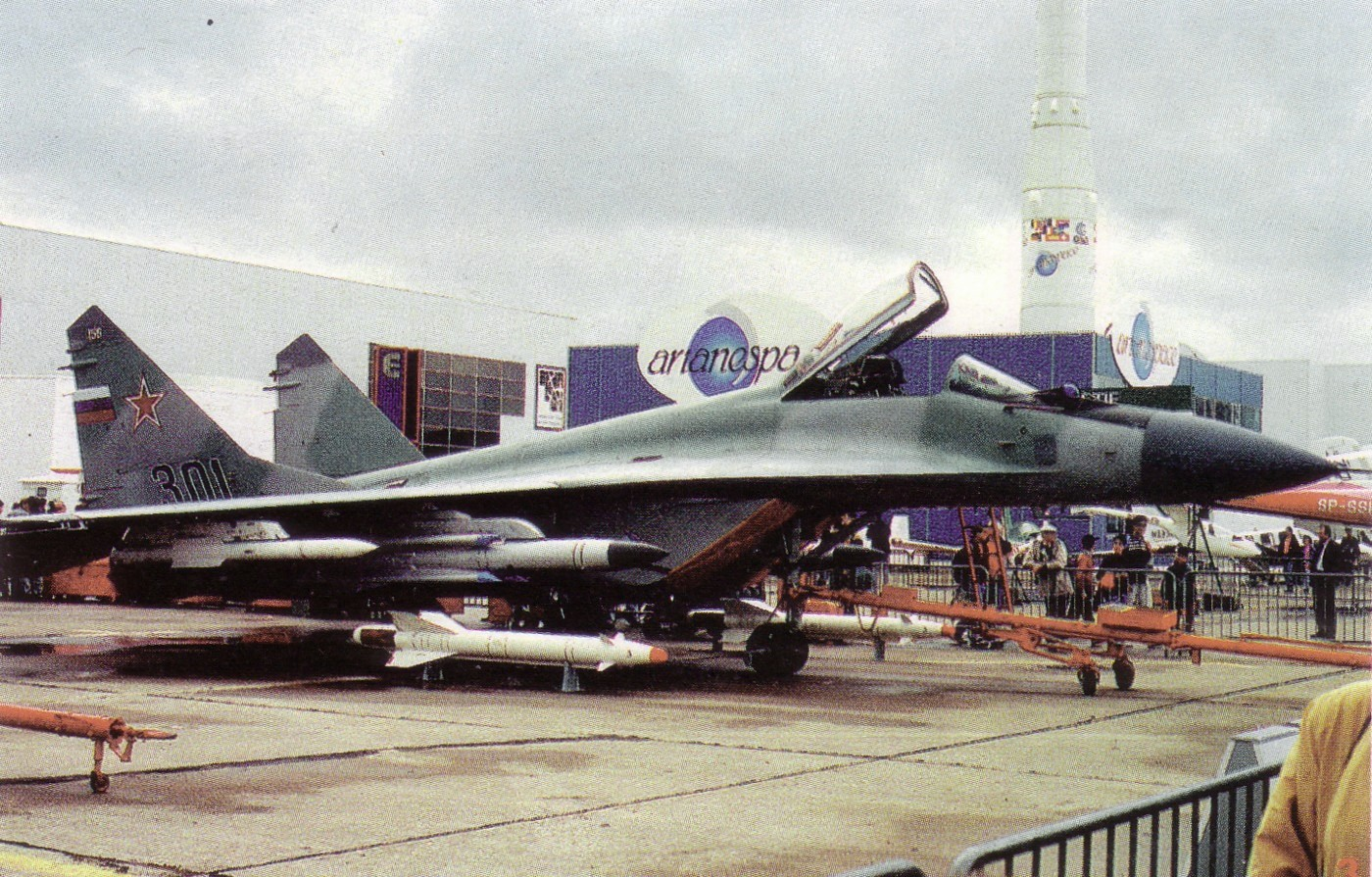
A MiG-29M on display. The MiG-29M was developed into a naval version, the MiG-29K.

The MiG-29K's first flight was performed on 23 July 1988 at Saky by test pilot Toktar Aubakirov. On 1 November 1989, on the same day as the Sukhoi Su-27K, (Note: The Su-27K was to be only an air-to-air fighter aircraft, while the MiG-29K was intended and designed to be a multirole ship-based fighter, able to attack enemy ships and support troops on land as well as conduct air defence missions.) Aubakirov executed the first carrier landing of MiG-29K on the aircraft-carrying cruiser Tbilisi (now known as Admiral Kuznetsov), the first take-off from the carrier's deck was successfully performed the same day. During 1989–1991, the MiG-29K underwent further tests aboard Admiral Kuznetsov. The project was put on hold with the collapse of the Soviet Union, while the Russian Navy only pursued the rival Su-33. (Note: Aviation authors Bill Gunston and Yefim Gordon characterised the rejection of the MiG-29K for the Su-33 as "astonishing", noting that the Su-33 was more expensive and incapable of launching missiles against surface targets. However, some analysts have stated the view that the MiG-29K was only a fall-back option if the Su-33 had proven to be too heavy for carrier operations; and that the Soviet Navy were only interested in fleet air defence, not strike or attack capabilities. Others attributed the rejection of the MiG-29K to the fact that, Sukhoi's designer general, Mikhail Simonov, was a member of the Committee of the Supreme Soviet which managed the aircraft industry.) Mikoyan continued work on the MiG-29K despite the lack of funding.

During its tests aboard Admiral Kuznetsov, the aircraft had a springboard-assisted takeoff from strips 195 metres (640 ft) and 95 m (312 ft) long. According to the results of the tests, the landing accuracy proved to be very high, which made it possible at a later stage to switch over to a three-cable arrester system on Admiral Gorshkov. The landing accuracy is additionally enhanced through the employment of an autothrottle system. The takeoff characteristics allow for most flights to be possible under tropical conditions at a ship speed of 10 knots (19 km/h; 12 mph).

=== Revival ===
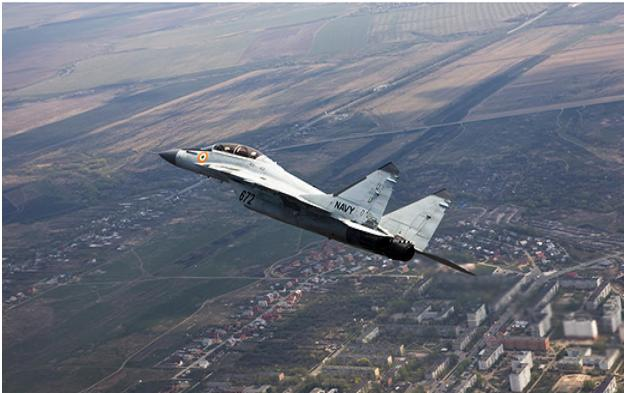
An Indian Navy MiG-29K performs a high speed climb

The MiG-29K programme was revived in response to the decision of the Indian Navy to acquire the former Soviet Navy aircraft carrier Admiral Gorshkov in 2004. When Admiral Gorshkov was part of the Soviet fleet, it was a hybrid aircraft carrier/cruiser using vertical take-off (V/STOL) aircraft; thus the deck was refurbished with a take-off ramp and arrestor wires for operating MiG-29Ks. The aircraft has an enlarged and folding wing, an arrestor hook and a corrosion-protected reinforced fuselage.

One factor favouring the MiG-29K over the Su-33 in the Indian decision was the larger size of the Su-33, which further limited the number of aircraft on deck. Modifications were made to the MiG-29K for Indian requirements, including the Zhuk-ME radar, RD-33MK engine, a combat payload up to 5,500 kilograms (12,100 lb), 13 weapon stations, and updated 4-channel digital fly-by-wire flight control system. It is compatible with the full range of weapons carried by the MiG-29M and MiG-29SMT.

The problem of lack of aircraft-carrier based AWACS platform may be tackled by further development of dual-seat MiG-29KUB. It is theoretically possible to outfit the MiG-29KUB with powerful radar, and encrypted data links, to permit networking of multiple MiG-29KUB aircraft for AEW coverage. The MiG-29KUB may also be enhanced in areas such as electronic warfare and long-range interdiction.

The MiG-29KUB two-seat variant took its first flight on 20 January 2007, followed by the MiG-29K on 25 June 2007.

== Design ==
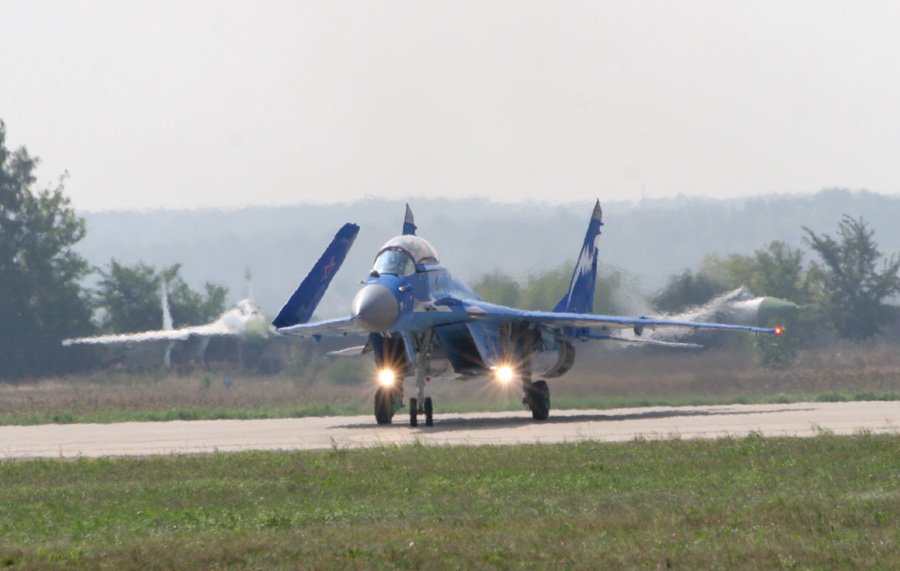
MiG-29K fighter at Zhukovskiy LII air field

The MiG-29K is modified from the Mikoyan MiG-29M for naval operations. The airframe and undercarriage are reinforced to withstand the stress experienced upon landing. Folding wings, an arrestor hook, and catapult attachments were added for carrier operations; the aircraft's undercarriage track was also widened. The MiG-29K, unlike the early MiG-29, can both conduct aerial refueling and "buddy" refuel other aircraft.

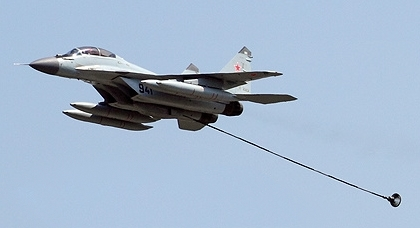
MiG-29K as a buddy refuelling tanker

The MiG-29K has two widely spaced RD-33MKs. The early prototypes were fitted with two RD-33K turbofan engines, each with afterburner thrust of 86.3 kN (19,800 lb) and a possible take-off thrust of 92.2 kN (20,723 lbf) for shipborne operations. The RD-33MK engine features 7% higher power over the base RD-33, enabled by the usage of improved materials for the turbine blades.

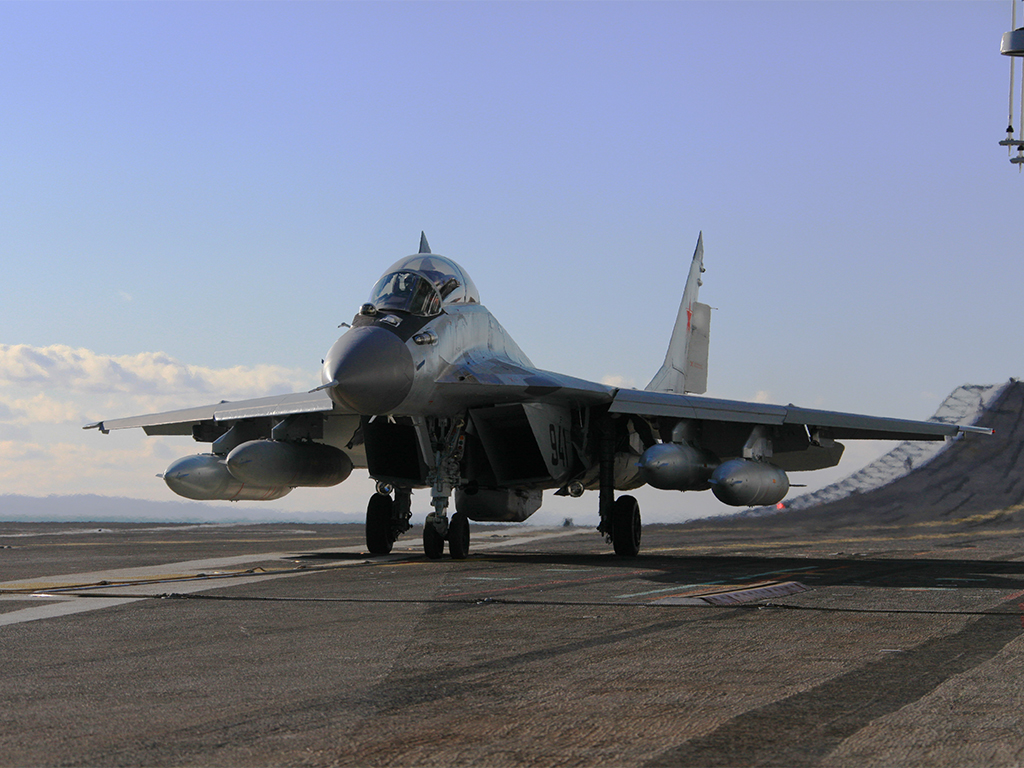
MiG-29K with External fuel tanks as a Buddy Tanker Aircraft

Internal fuel was increased from 3,340 to 4,560 kg (7,360 to 10,100 lb), to give a combat radius of 850 km (531 mi). The combat radius can be increased to 1,300 km (810 mi) with up to four underwing fuel drop tanks. The maximum weight of the aircraft grew from 19.5 to 22.4 t (43,000 to 49,400 lb), to allow for increased payloads. The MiG-29KUB two-seat fighter, intended for pilot training, can also conduct combat missions identical to the single-seat fighter. It often takes on the role of a buddy refuelling aircraft.

=== Cockpit and avionics ===
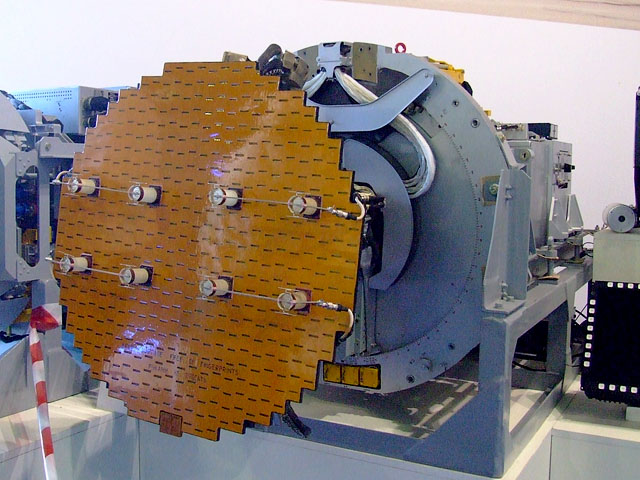
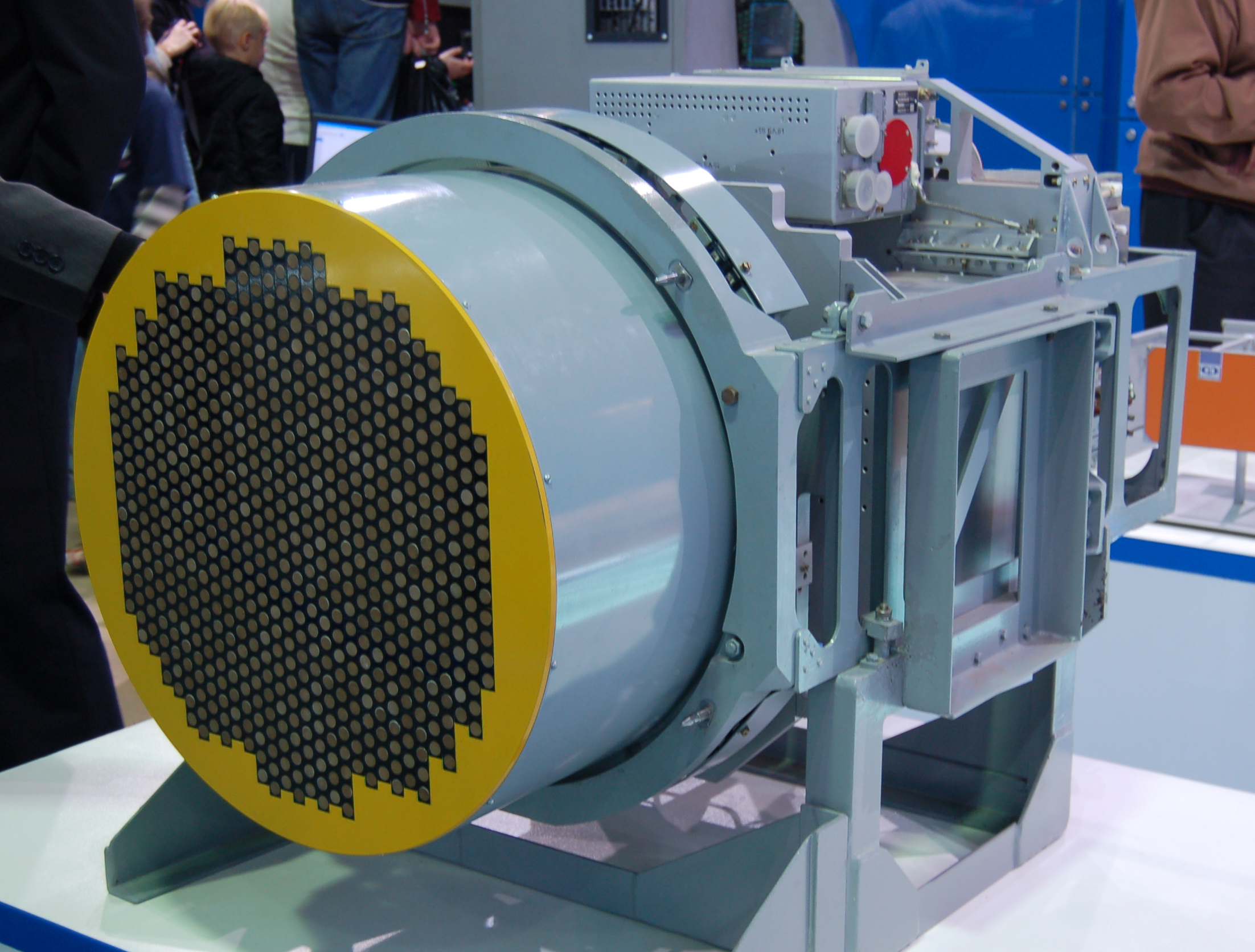
Comparisons between the Zhuk-ME (left) and Zhuk-AE (right)

The aircraft is equipped with three multifunctional color liquid-crystal displays (seven LCDs on the MiG-29KUB), a four-channel digital fly-by-wire flight control system, passive homing system for anti-radar missiles, Sigma-95 GPS receiver, TopGun helmet-mounted targeting system and electronic countermeasures (ECM). Additionally, an onboard oxygen generating system eliminates the need for heavy oxygen canisters. The types of combat missions undertaken by the MiG-29K can be increased by adding optronic/infrared imaging reconnaissance pods.

The Zhuk-ME is a development of the N010 Zhuk radar, introducing functions such as terrain mapping and following. The radar, weighing 220 kilograms (490 lb), features improved signal processing and a detection range of up to 120 km (75 mi) vs a 5 m^{2} RCS target for the export variant. In the air targeting mode, up to ten targets can be tracked and four targets engaged simultaneously. In air to surface mode the radar can detect a tank from up to 25 kilometres (16 mi) away and a bridge from 120 kilometres (75 mi) away, a naval destroyer could be detected up to 300 kilometres (190 mi) away, while up to two surface targets can be tracked at once. The radar has a scanning area of ±85 degrees in azimuth and +56/-40 in elevation.

The Zhuk-AE radar was developed with modular approach, enabling upgrade of existing Zhuk ME radars deployed in MiG-29 platforms into the active electronically scanned array (AESA) Zhuk-AE standard. India is already operating the Bars phased array radar on its Su-30MKI and has specified AESA as a critical element of the MRCA platform. The MiG-29K can be outfitted with an IRST system integrated with both optical and laser systems. It can provide targeting solutions for ground and air targets at up to 15 km (9.3 mi), with all-round 360-degree coverage. The IRST can also provide detailed trajectories of missiles at closer ranges.

=== Weapons and defensive capabilities ===
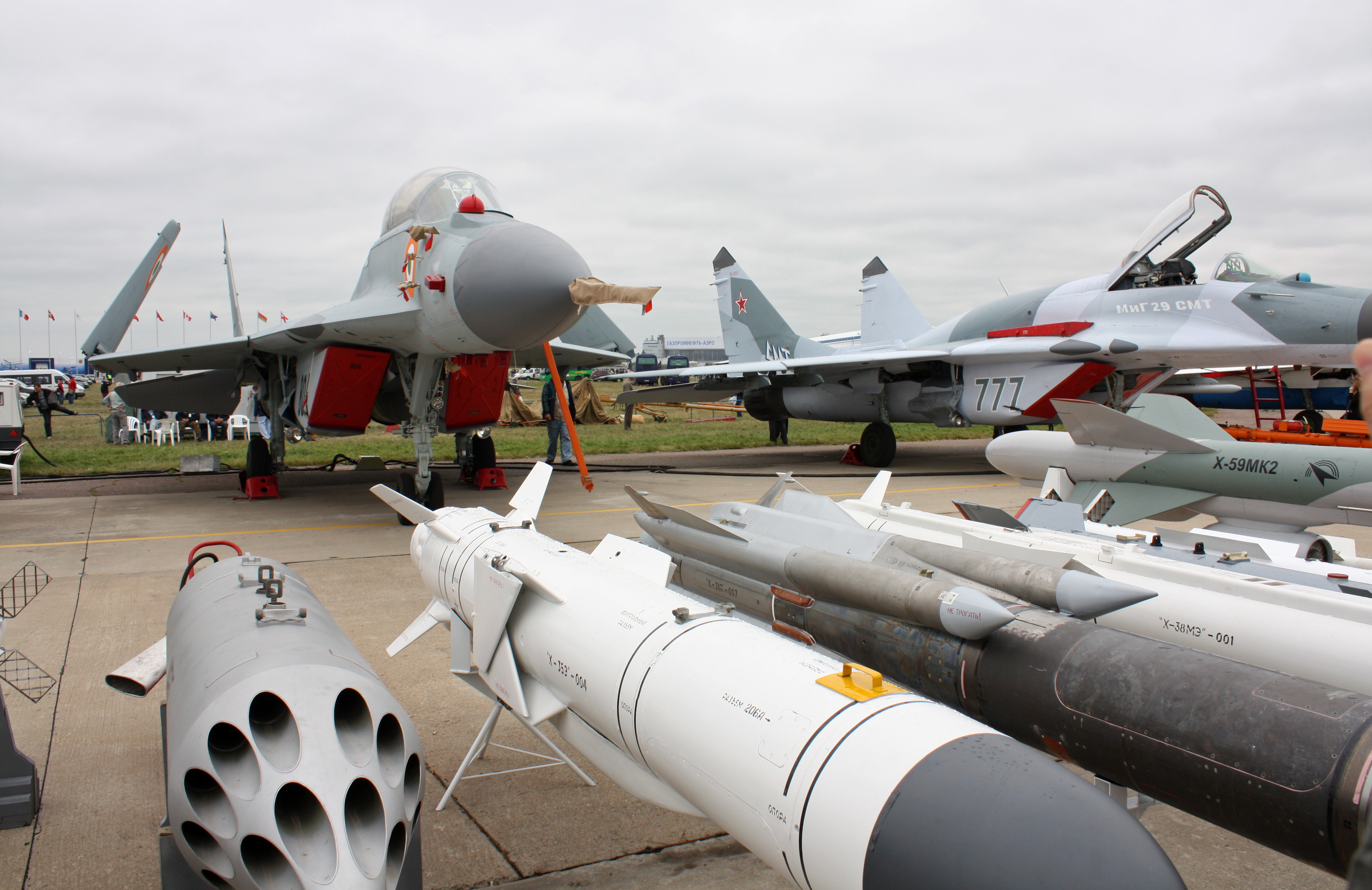
A MiG-29K and its armaments at MAKS Airshow. The folded wings maximise the limited space available on an aircraft carrier.

MiG-29K has a GSh-30-1 30 mm cannon in the port wing root. It has provisions for laser-guided and electro-optical bombs, as well as air-to-surface missiles like Kh-25ML/25MP, Kh-29T, Kh-31G/31A, Kh-35U, and rockets. Kh-31P passive radar seeker missiles are used as anti-radiation missiles. Kh-35, Kh-31A antiship missiles are for anti-ship roles; for aerial combat air-to-air missile like RVV-AE, R-27ER/ET and R-73E are fitted. The aircraft is also adaptable to various foreign weapons.

The MiG-29K has a combination of low-observable technology, advanced electronic-warfare capabilities, reduced ballistic vulnerability, and standoff weapons to enhance the fighter's survivability. According to Mikoyan, extensive use of radar-absorbent materials reduce the MiG-29K's radar signature 4–5 times over the basic MiG-29. The RD-33MK turbofan engine was also engineered to reduce infrared signature and improve aircraft camouflage.

== Operational history ==
=== India ===
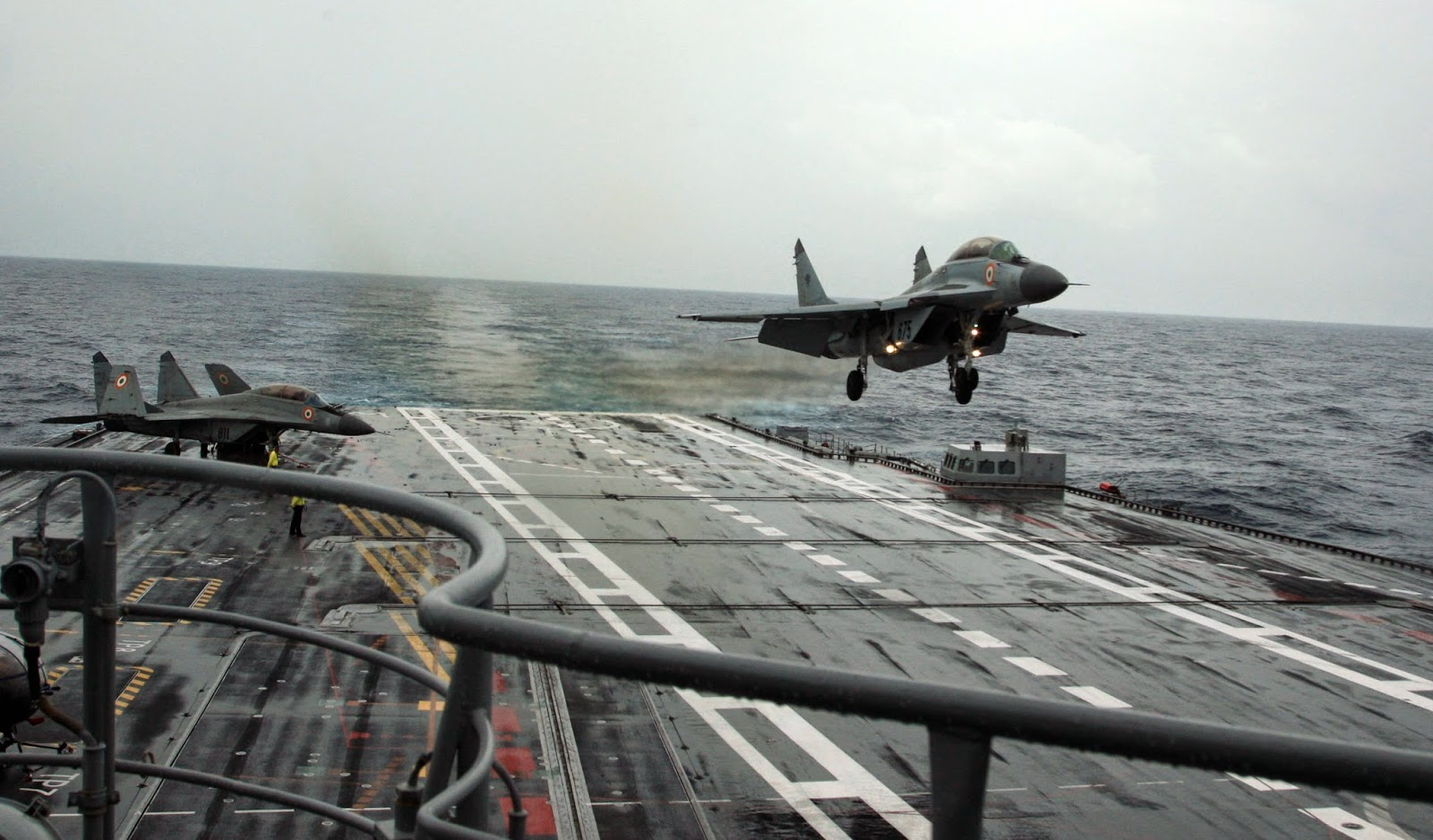
MiG-29K of INAS 303 executes a low approach to the aircraft carrier Vikramaditya in 2014.

In January 2004, Indian Navy ordered 12 MiG-29K single-seat and 4 MiG-29KUB two-seat fighters. The MiG-29K is to provide both airborne fleet air defence and surface attack capabilities. Deliveries began in December 2009. Prior to their delivery to India, the MiG-29Ks underwent testing on board Admiral Kuznetsov. In January 2010, India and Russia signed a deal worth US$1.2 billion for the Indian Navy to receive an additional 29 MiG-29Ks. The MiG-29K entered operational service with India in February 2010. Six aircraft were delivered by the end of 2010 Further deliveries of five MiG-29Ks and a flight simulator took place in May 2011. Further deliveries are to continue through 2012. The fighters were based at INS Hansa in Goa on India's west coast until Admiral Gorshkov joined the navy under the name of INS Vikramaditya in last quarter of 2013. Vikramaditya was expected to carry up to 24 MiG-29K/KUB fighters. INS Vikrant, India's first indigenous aircraft carrier, also carries this aircraft, but will be complemented by the Dassault Rafale M from 2030.

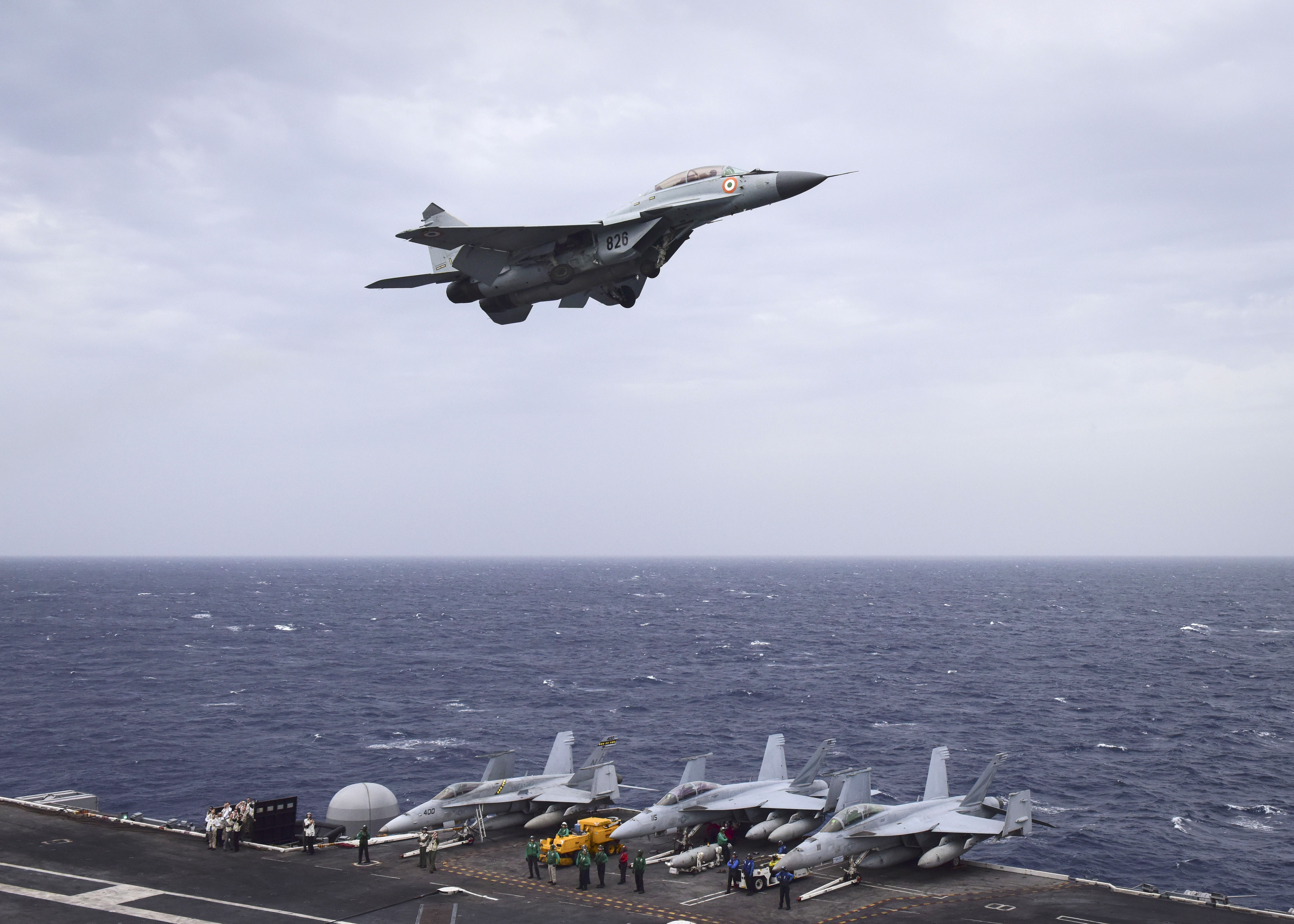
An Indian navy MIG-29K aircraft flies over USS Nimitz during Exercise Malabar 2017

Further MiG-29K orders by India were frozen after a MiG-29KUB crashed during testing in Russia prior to delivery to India; the Indian Defence Ministry commented that the crash cast a shadow on the credibility of the aircraft. Russia later announced that pilot error had caused the crash, and there was no need to ground the aircraft. In August 2011, MiG's General Director Sergei Korotkov announced that the final five out of the 16 aircraft contracted in 2004 would be delivered by the end of the year; and that deliveries of a second batch of 29 MiG-29Ks would begin in 2012. In November 2012, the MiG-29K/KUB completed sea trials for the Indian Navy. One problem is that Western and Ukrainian sanctions on Russia have prevented Mikoyan importing components for assembly at the factory, instead they have had to be installed "on the flightline" in India.

In a 2016 report, India's national auditor CAG criticized the aircraft due to defects in engines, airframes and fly-by-wire systems. The serviceability of MiG-29K was reported to be 37.63% and that of MiG-29KUB ranging from 21.30% to 47.14%; with 40 engines (62%) being rejected/withdrawn from service due to design defects. These defects are likely to reduce the service life of the aircraft from the stated 6000 hours. However, it was reported that recent efforts made by the two countries have improved serviceability to around 70%. In 2017, the Indian government announced the planned replacement of the MiG-29 with 57 new aircraft, with a competition primarily between the French Dassault Rafale and the American Boeing F/A-18E/F Super Hornet. After conducting trials in 2022, the Rafale M was finalized in 2025 with 26 units purchased.

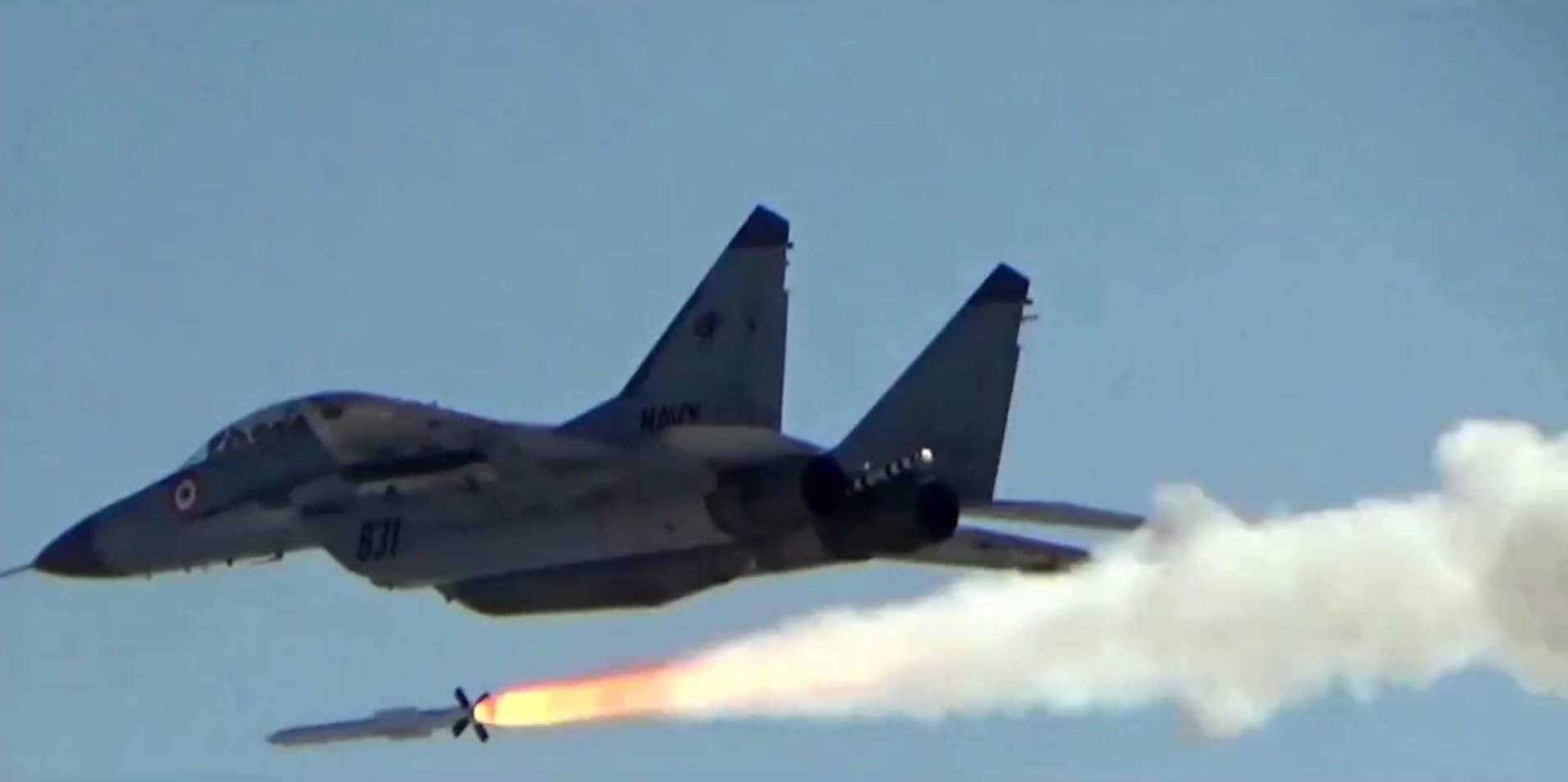
MiG-29K firing R-77 missile

In December 2018 when addressing the press on the eve of Navy Day CNS Admiral Lanba noted regarding the MiG-29K, "there is no issue on supplies of spare parts from Russia at the moment... The MiG-29K fleet has been performing well now." The Indian Navy plans to deploy the MiG-29K onboard its first domestically built carrier, INS Vikrant, and will acquire further combat jets with updated capabilities for this purpose. Indian Navy Chief Admiral Sunil Lanba announced that issues related to maintenance and availability of spare parts for the MiG-29K fleet, which had previously undermined their readiness, had been resolved. On 26 May 2023, a MiG-29K successfully landed on INS Vikrant during night sea trials of the ship. The Indian Navy has reportedly had multiple Radar failures with the Zhuk-ME radar used on both the MiG-29K/KUB with its serviceability dropping to around 60-hours before becoming defective. This was also confirmed by leaked documents released by Black Mirror Hackers, a Ukrainian hacking group. The Indian Navy cancelled OEM warranties on the Russian inability to deliver spares and proceeded with indigenous replacement of components, resulting in increased availability rates. The Indian Air Force's Base repair Depot in Nasik also upgraded the MiG-29K fleet and conducted overhauls for the ejection seats in 2026.

During the 2025 India–Pakistan conflict, 15 MiG-29Ks were also stationed on the INS Vikrant-led Carrier Battle Group deployed in the Arabian Sea.

=== Russia ===
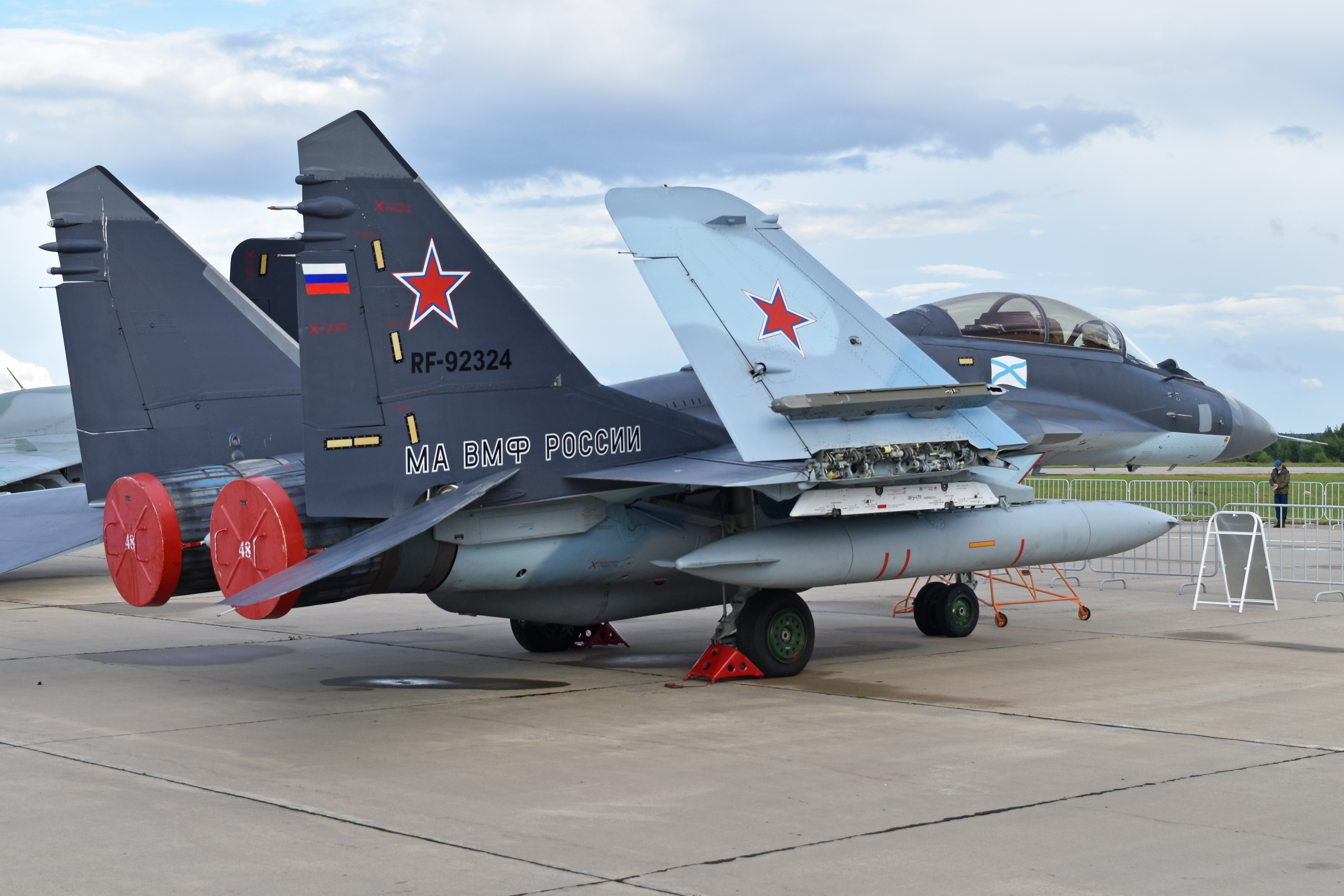
MiG-29KR of the Russian Navy on display at Kubinka Airbase

The 279th Shipborne Fighter Aviation Regiment of the Russian Navy has a fleet of 21 Su-33 fighters whose service lives were expected to be reached by 2015. Around 10 to 12 will receive an upgrade including the Gefest SVP-24 bombsight for free-fall bombs, giving them a limited ground attack capability, but more aircraft were needed. It was less cost-effective to open the Su-33 production line for a small run than to piggy-back on the Indian Navy's order of MiG-29Ks. India paid $730 million for the development and delivery of 16 units, while 24 for the Russian Navy would cost approximately $1 billion.

The Russian Navy ordered 24 MiG-29Ks in late 2009 for Admiral Kuznetsov. Deliveries of the MiG-29K for the Russian Navy started in 2010. MiG and Russia were in final negotiations for an order for more MiG-29K/KUB aircraft in August 2011. An order for 20 MiG-29KR fighter-bombers and four MiG-29KUBR operational trainers for operation from Admiral Kuznetsov, replacing the Sukhoi Su-33, was officially announced in February 2012. However, in 2015, Major-General Igor Kozhin, the Commander of the Navy's Air and Air Defence Forces, announced that a second fighter regiment would be formed to augment the current force, with the intention that the MiG-29s be used by this new unit, with some existing Su-33s refurbished for further use.

In October 2016, four MiG-29KR/KUBR from the 100th Independent Shipborne Fighter Aviation Regiment formed part of the air group aboard Admiral Kuznetsov as the ship deployed with its battle group to the Mediterranean Sea as part of the Russian campaign in Syria. On 13 November 2016, a MiG-29KUBR on operations in the Mediterranean crashed en route back to Admiral Kuznetsov.

== Variants ==
MiG-29K (Product 9.41)
Indian single seat variant.
MiG-29KR (Product 9.41R)
Russian single seat variant, replaces Ukrainian and Indian equipment with Russian.
MiG-29KUB (Product 9.47)
Indian tandem two-seat operational trainer variant.
MiG-29KUBR (Product 9.47R)
Russian tandem two-seat operational trainer variant.
MiG-29KVP
(KVP – Korotkaya Vzlet Posadka – Short take-off landing (STOL)) Several aircraft converted to article 9–12 standard, (or 9–18?), with high-lift systems strengthened undercarriage and arrestor hook, for research into deck landings and pilot training.

== Operators ==
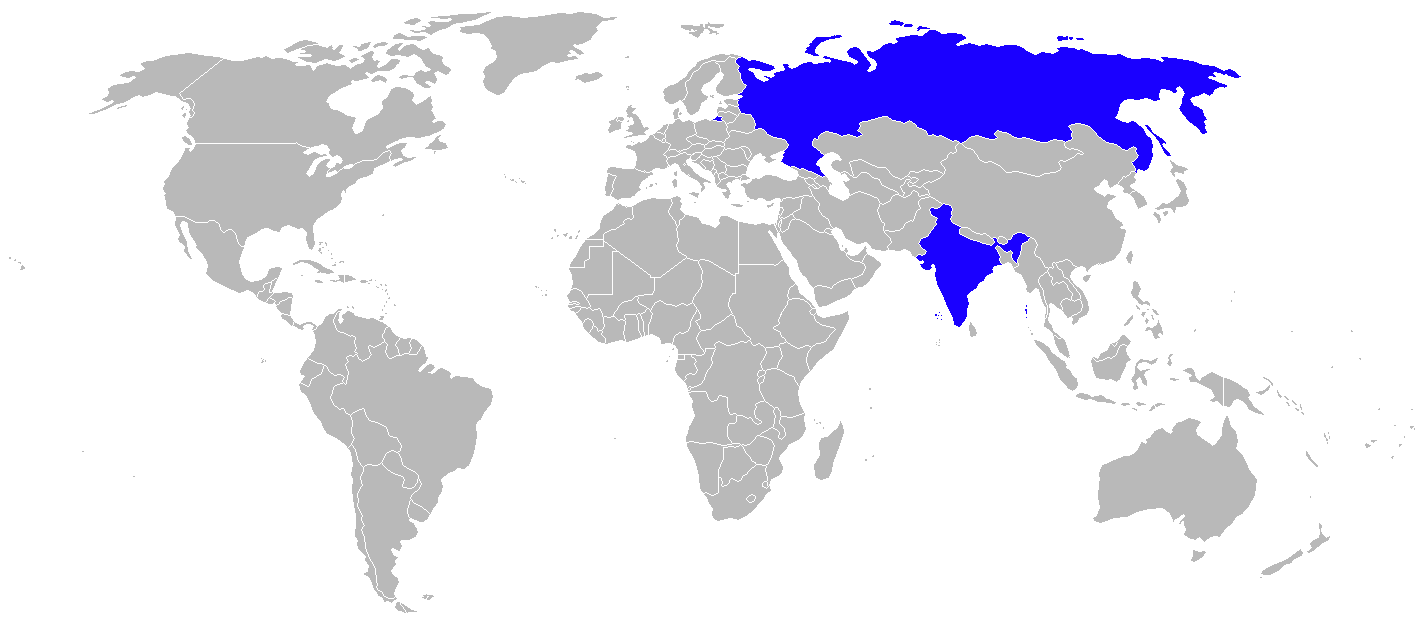
MiG-29K operators in 2010

India

- Indian Navy – 37 single seat K and 8 dual seat KUB purchased, 5 subsequently lost in accidents, four K and two KUB. The forty-five aircraft were ordered in two batches, sixteen in January 2004, for delivery from 2009, an option for 29 additional aircraft, for delivery by the end of 2016, being taken in 2010. 40 aircraft currently in service.
  - Indian Naval Air Arm
    - 300 Indian Naval Air Squadron – INS Hansa, Goa
    - 303 Indian Naval Air Squadron – INS Hansa, Goa (embarked in INS Vikramaditya)

Russia

- Russian Navy – ordered 20 MiG-29KR and 4 MiG-29KUBR in 2012. All the aircraft were delivered by early 2016. 22 aircraft currently in service.
  - Russian Naval Aviation
    - 100th Independent Shipborne Fighter Aviation Regiment – Yeysk (air base), Krasnodar Krai

== Accidents ==
- On 23 June 2011, a MiG-29KUB crashed during testing in Russia, prior to delivery to India, killing its two pilots.
- On 13 November 2016, a MiG-29KUBR crashed in the Mediterranean Sea while returning to the aircraft carrier Admiral Kuznetsov from a mission over Syria. The pilot was reportedly rescued.
- On 3 Jan 2018, an Indian Navy MiG-29K veered off a runway, at Goa, and caught fire, the pilot ejected safely.
- On 16 November 2019, an Indian Navy MiG-29KUB trainer aircraft crashed after bird strike and engine failure; both pilots ejected safely.
- On 23 February 2020, after taking off from INS Hansa, an Indian Navy MiG-29K aircraft crashed, the pilot ejected safely.
- On 26 November 2020, an Indian Navy MiG-29KUB trainer aircraft crashed into sea with one pilot killed.
- On 12 October 2022, an Indian Navy MiG-29K aircraft crashed off the coast of Goa in the sea; the pilot was rescued.

== Specifications (MiG-29K - Izdeliye 9.41) ==
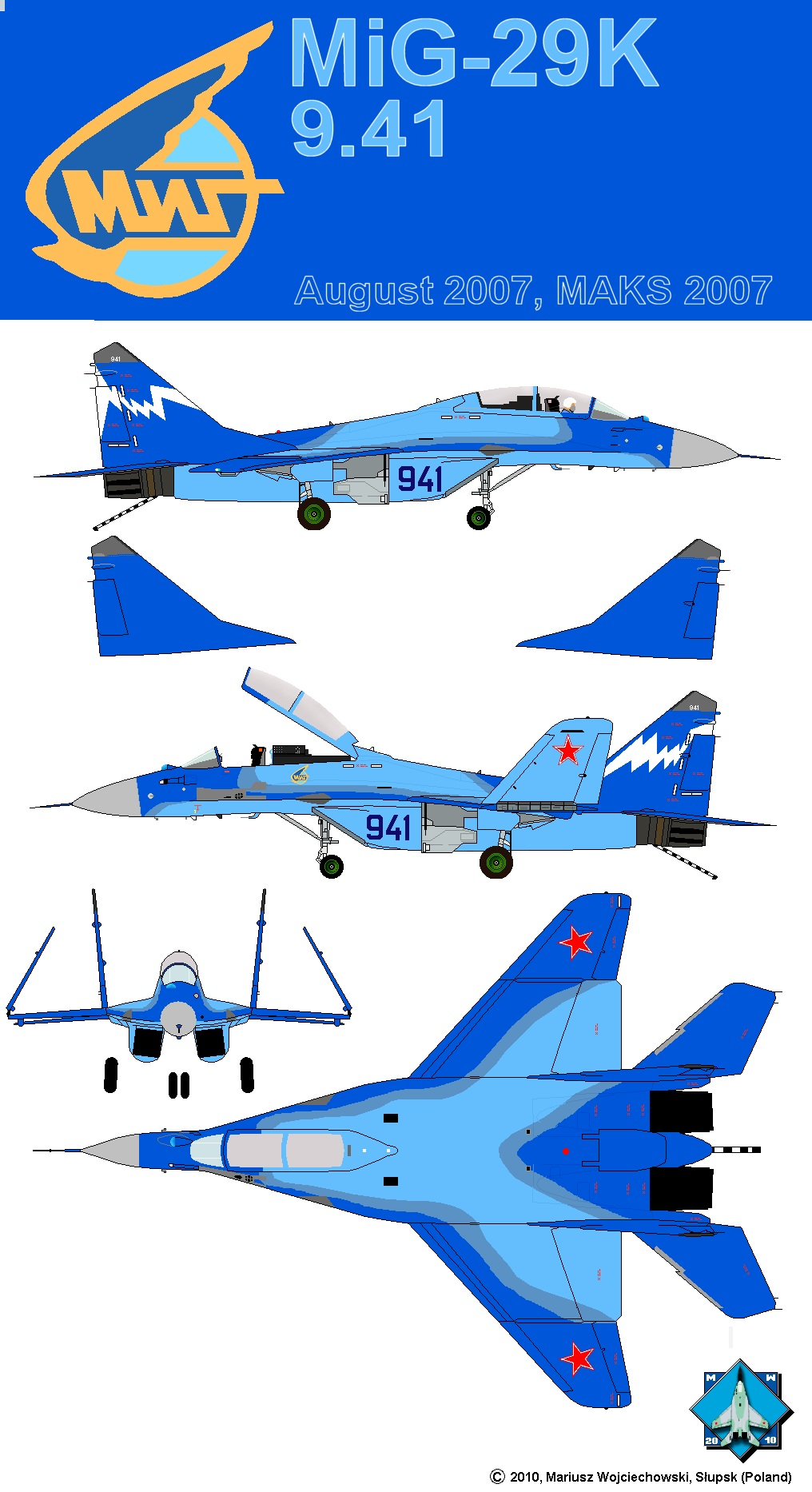
4-view drawing of MiG-29K (9.47)

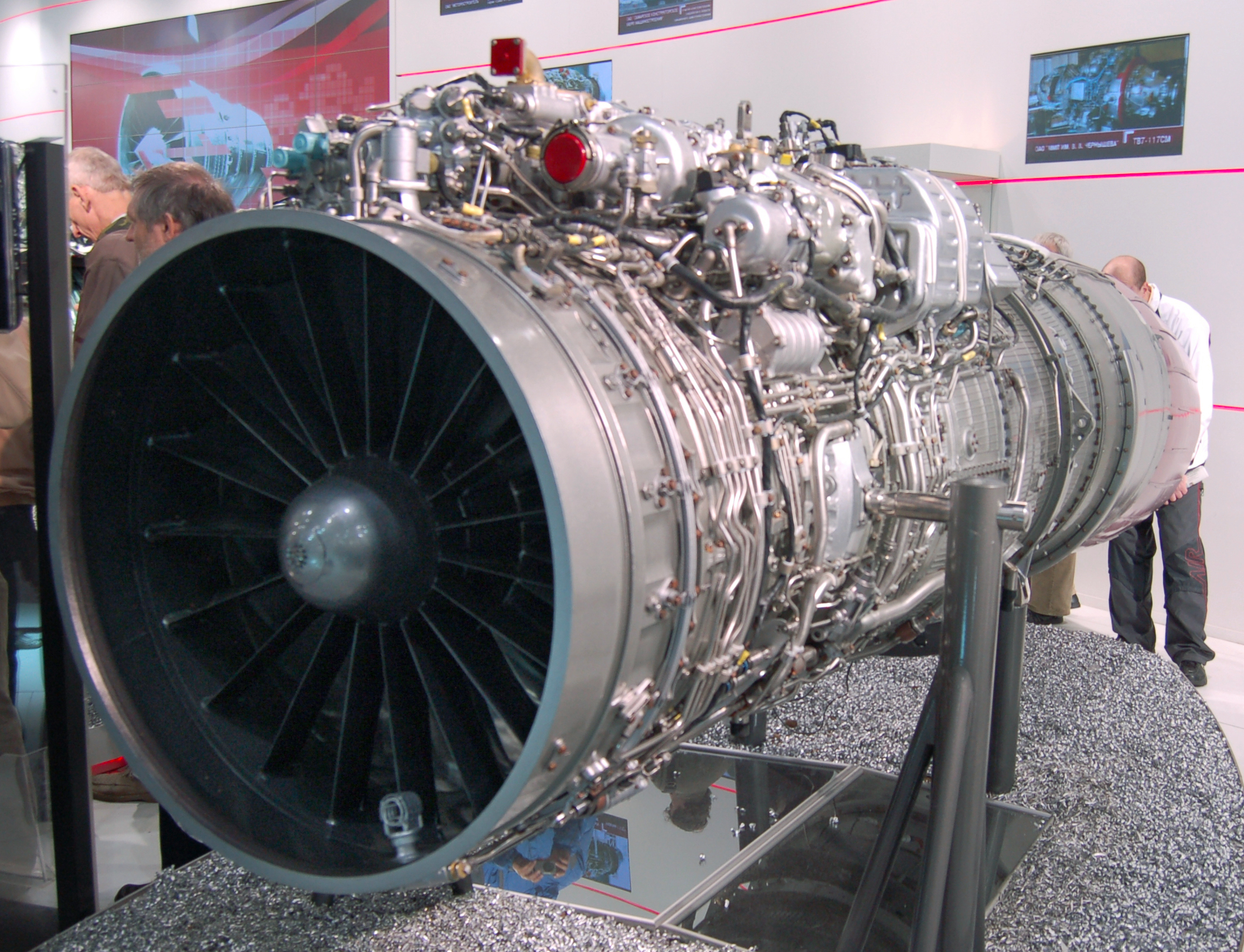
Klimov RD-33MK at MAKS 2009

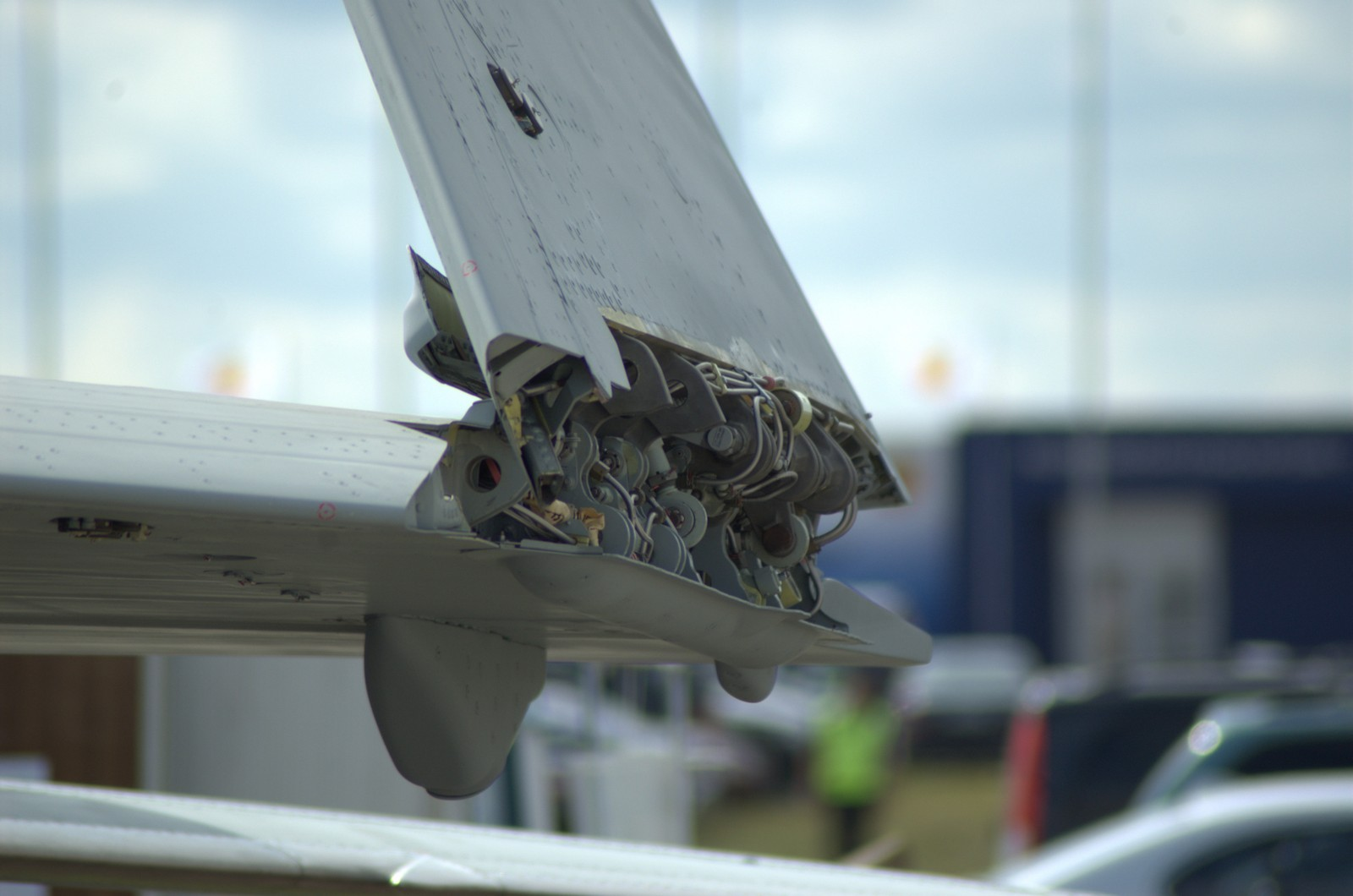
Wing folding mechanism

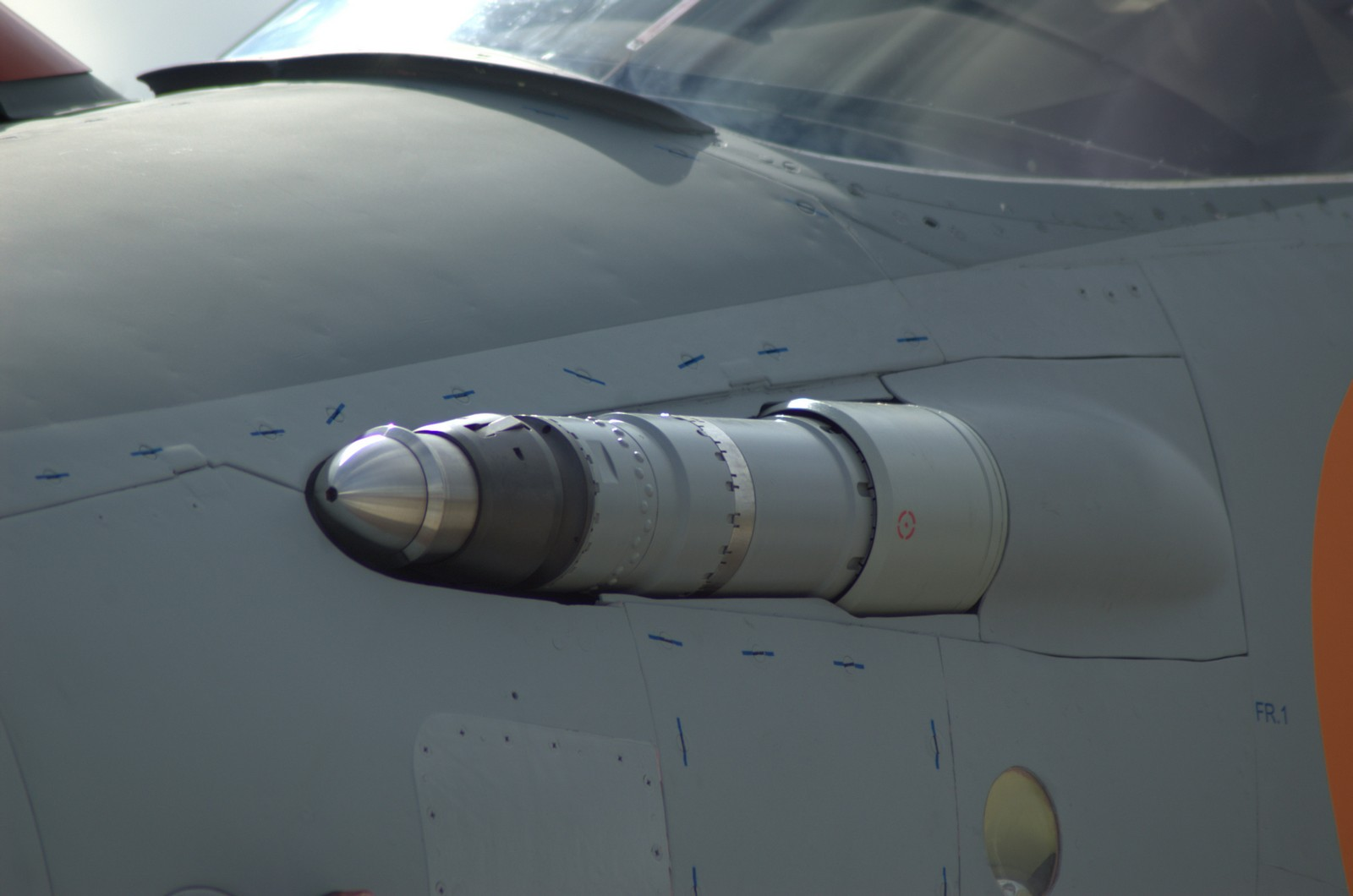
Refuelling tube

Data from Rosoboronexport, Mikoyan, Gordon and Davidson, deagel.com, airforce-technology.com, Business World

General characteristics

- Crew: 1
- Length: 17.3 m (56 ft 9 in)
- Wingspan: 11.99 m (39 ft 4 in)
- Height: 4.4 m (14 ft 5 in)
- Wing area: 45 m^{2} (480 sq ft)
- Empty weight: 12,000 kg (26,455 lb)
- Gross weight: 18,550 kg (40,896 lb)
- Max takeoff weight: 24,500 kg (54,013 lb)
- Powerplant: 2 × Klimov RD-33MK afterburning turbofan engines, 52.96 kN (11,905 lbf) thrust each dry, 88.3 kN (19,840 lbf) with afterburner

Performance

- Maximum speed: 2,200 km/h (1,400 mph, 1,200 kn) / Mach 2+ at high altitude

1,400 km/h (870 mph; 760 kn) / Mach 1.13 at low altitude

- Cruise speed: 1,500 km/h (930 mph, 810 kn) / M1.21
- Range: 2,000 km (1,200 mi, 1,100 nmi) at high altitude

700 km (430 mi; 380 nmi) at low altitude

- Combat range: 850 km (530 mi, 460 nmi)
- Ferry range: 2,000 km (1,200 mi, 1,100 nmi) internals

3,000 km (1,900 mi; 1,600 nmi) with 3 drop tanks
5,500 km (3,400 mi; 3,000 nmi) with 3 drop tanks + one aerial refuelling

- Service ceiling: 17,500 m (57,400 ft)
- g limits: +8
- Rate of climb: 330 m/s (65,000 ft/min) initial

109 m/s (358 ft/s) average from 0–6,000 m (0–19,685 ft)

- Wing loading: 442 kg/m^{2} (91 lb/sq ft)
- Thrust/weight: 0.98

Armament

- Guns: 1 × 30 mm Gryazev-Shipunov GSh-30-1 autocannon with 150 rounds
- Hardpoints: 9 × including the ones on multi-lock bomb carriers with a capacity of up to 4,500 kilograms (9,900 lb) of stores, with provisions to carry combinations of:
  - Rockets:
    - S-5
    - S-8
    - S-24
  - Missiles:
    - Air-to-air missiles:
      - 8 × R-73E
      - 6 x RVV-AE
      - Astra (Indian Navy)
    - Air-to-surface missile:
      - Rampage (Indian Navy)
    - Anti-ship missiles:
      - 4 x Kh-31A/AD
      - 4 x Kh-35U/UE
      - 4 x NASM-MR (Indian Navy)
    - Anti-radiation missiles:
      - 4 x Kh-31P/PD
  - Bombs:
    - 4 x KAB-500KR TV-guided bombs
    - 4 x KAB-500L laser-guided bombs
    - Khagantak-243 (Indian Navy)

Others:

- Flare dispenser pod and chaff pod or
- Electronic countermeasures (ECM) pod or
- Targeting pods or
- Drop tanks

Avionics

- Phazotron Zhuk-M radar (export designation Zhuk-ME)
- OEPS-29 electro-optical targeting system

== See also ==
Related development

- Mikoyan MiG-29
- Mikoyan MiG-29M
- Mikoyan MiG-35

Aircraft of comparable role, configuration, and era

- Sukhoi Su-33
- McDonnell Douglas F/A-18 Hornet
- Shenyang J-15
- Dassault Rafale M
- HAL TEDBF - under development

Related lists

- List of military aircraft of the Soviet Union and the CIS
- List of fighter aircraft
