= Gayathri (1977 film) =

- Poster
- Directed by: R. Pattabhiraman
- Screenplay by: Panchu Arunachalam
- Based on: Gayathri by Sujatha
- Produced by: Vijaya–Meena
- Starring: Jaishankar; Rajinikanth; Sridevi
- Cinematography: Vinayagam
- Edited by: B. Kanthasamy
- Music by: Ilaiyaraaja
- Production company: Vijaya Meena Films
- Release date: 7 October 1977
- Running time: 122 minutes
- Country: India
- Language: Tamil

Gayathri is a 1977 Indian Tamil-language crime thriller film directed by R. Pattabhiraman and written by Panchu Arunachalam. The film stars Jaishankar, Rajinikanth and Sridevi. It is based on the novel of the same name by Sujatha. The film was released on 7 October 1977.

== Plot ==
Rajarathnam is a rich man who lives with his sister Sarasu and a young house maid in Madras. His sister arranges a marriage for him with Gayathri, a sixteen-year old who lives in Tiruchirappalli. Soon after they marry, Gayathri moves to Rajarathnam's house and realises that the family has dark secrets.

Rajarathnam is actually a blue-film producer – he secretly records himself and his new wife in their bedroom scenes without her knowledge, and sells the films in the black market. Gayathri initially gives Rajarathnam the benefit of the doubt, but later discovers that Rajarathnam is already married to another woman, who is now insane. Ganesh, a friend of the writer Chellappa, tries to free Gayathri from the hands of Rajarathnam.

== Cast ==
- Jaishankar as Ganesh
- Rajinikanth as Rajarathnam
- Sridevi as Gayathri
- Rajasulochana as Sarasu
- P. Jayadevi
- M. N. Rajam as Gayathri's mother
- Rajee as Indra
- Rajeshwari as Lalitha
- S. A. Ashokan as Shama Iyer
- Vennira Aadai Moorthy as Chellappa
- Delhi Kumar as Gayathri's father
- Tiger Prabhakar

== Production ==
Gaayathri is based on Sujatha's novel of the same name, and was conceived during the Emergency. The screenplay was written by Panchu Arunachalam.

== Soundtrack ==
The soundtrack was composed by Ilaiyaraaja, with lyrics by Panchu Arunachalam. The song "Kaalai Paniyil Aadum" is set to the raga Hamir Kalyani, and "Vaazhve Mayama" is set to Dharmavati.

Track listing
No.	Title	Singer(s)	Length
1.	"Kaalai Paniyil Aadum"	Sujatha Mohan	4:00
2.	"Vaazhve Mayama"	B. S. Sasirekha	3:57
3.	"Aattam Kondattam"	P. Susheela	4:06
4.	"Unnai Thaan"	A. L. Raghavan, S. Janaki	3:40
Total length:			15:43

== Reception ==
Film World wrote, "But for the wrong portrayal by Jaishankar, the movie would have maintained its pre-interval tempo. Yet, Gayatri is certainly off beat, contributing to salvage the losing face of Tamil Cinema".

== Bibliography ==
- Ramachandran, Naman (2014) [2012]. Rajinikanth: The Definitive Biography. New Delhi: Penguin Books. ISBN 978-81-8475-796-5.
- Sundararaman (2007) [2005]. Raga Chintamani: A Guide to Carnatic Ragas Through Tamil Film Music (2nd ed.). Pichhamal Chintamani. OCLC 295034757.
