= Sorga Theevu =

1970 novel by Sujatha

- Author: Sujatha
- Language: Tamil
- Genre: Science fiction
- Publication date: early 1970s
- Publication place: India

Sorga Theevu (Sorkkattīvu, lit. Heavenly Island) is a novel by Indian writer Sujatha published in the early 1970s. It was the first science fiction novel written by him, and one of the earliest science fiction works in Tamil language.

== Plot ==
The story revolves around a computer scientist named Iyngar who is kidnapped to an island called Sorga Theevu. The island is filled with emotionless people under the influence of a drug used by a supercomputer to control them. Iyngar is forced to fix the supercomputer's problems while he is there on the island. Some islanders, gaining awareness of their condition, revolt alongside Iyngar to destroy the supercomputer.
