= Niramatra Vanavil =

Niramatra Vanavil (transl. Colourless Rainbow) is a novel by Sujatha. It portrays a man who loses his family overnight, and how he copes with life afterwards.

== Plot ==
Krishnamurthy is a talented programmer and a partner at a software firm. He has a handsome salary along with an efficient secretary and a slightly annoying managing partner. In his wife, daughter, and uncle, he has an ideal family. The story begins with Krishnamurthy and his wife Kalyani discussing the school admission of their three-year-old daughter. With the help of uncle Kothari, who stays with them, they get an interview at a prestigious school in Madras. Though all the three are worried about the admissions, the little girl, Andal Roja Krishnamurthy, impresses the principal with her smart talk and gets into the school. Back at Murthy's office, they win a contract with their client, and Murthy and his managing partner, Manavaalan, need to travel to the United States in a week. Initially Murthy is reluctant since the day of travel clashes with his nephew's wedding, but after working out a plan he agrees to it. So, as planned he leaves immediately after the wedding, but not happy about leaving his family still in Kanchipuram. After catching up with Manavaalan, he learns that they need to stop for a night in Hong Kong. Murthy is angered since he had to leave the wedding in a hurry just because Manavaalan wants to have fun for a night. Refusing to sleep with the girl Manavaalan has hired, Murthy just roams around the city with her till midnight. He is awakened by Manavaalan and is told that his family back home had a small accident. Confused and worried, not able to know what has happened, Murthy returns to India to find that his wife, child and his uncle had died in a road accident when they were travelling back to Madras. Devastated and dejected, Murthy blames himself for leaving them. He is angry at everyone, especially Manavaalan. He then decides to kill himself so he can join his family after death. Eventually Murthy drives a car insanely and gets into an accident, but survives.

After being unconscious for a few days, he wakes up in a hospital where he is watched continuously. Manavaalan visits him frequently. The doctor introduces Murthy to meet a girl named Supriya who had also unsuccessfully attempted suicide. Murthy refuses to talk to her and snaps at her. Later after being treated for his injuries, he returns to his home, and to work. Though he still thinks of suicide, he inwardly knows that he lacks the courage to do it. He goes to Kanchipuram and finds the photo studio that shot his nephew's wedding video. He gets an edited copy of the video with the shots in which his wife and his daughter are seen. Before coming back to Madras, he accidentally meets the girl whom the doctor introduced to him in the hospital. He gives her a lift in his office car, talks to her for a while and finds out that she tried to kill herself after her husband died. He understands that her grief is similar to his, though he declines her invitation to meet later. While watching the video, he is distracted by the thoughts of Supriya. He finds out where she lives from the office car's driver who had dropped her earlier. He goes to her flat there that evening and she is more than happy to see him. They both go out and sit and talk about their lives and losses. Apparently, Supriya had lost her husband just eighteen days after their marriage. Supriya suggests that he should move in with her and they can live together just as friends since they both feel better when they are together. Murthy moves in with her the same night. She gives him his own bedroom. Unable to sleep, he calls out to her so they can talk and they both end up sleeping with each other later that night. When he wakes up, he feels better. This starts the couple's live-in relationship, and in no time he proposes to her and they decide to get married.

He, then gets a hand-written anonymous letter warning him not to trust Supriya. He ignores it, but he gets more such letters. With the help of a friend, he finds out that his personal secretary Gunavathi is the one who has been writing the letters. He fires her, but later he gets a hint that whatever she has written in the letter might be true. He goes to meet her at her house, and discovers that Manavaalan hired Supriya to make Murthy get out of his misery and depression so that he could work again. He lashes out at Manavaalan for being so mean and money-minded. He is mad at Supriya, who confesses that it was true and that she was never married. He calls off the wedding in spite of her begging that she, in fact, loves him. Overly depressed, he decides that he would join his wife and his baby. This time he determinedly walks in the railway tracks towards a moving train, but is distracted by the crying of a child in a train that was stationed. He finds a small girl, of his daughter's age, alone and crying. He takes this girl to the police and learns that her father is a thief who ran away after abandoning her. Seeing that no one was there to take care of this girl, he brings her to his own home to his aunt. After being bathed and dressed in clean clothes, the girl looks much better, and she reminds him of his own daughter. He remarks to his aunt that he is going to adopt her since she is his Andaal Roja Krishnamurthy.

== Key Characters ==
- Krishnamurthy - the protagonist who has a nearly perfect life, then loses it.
- Manavaalan - Murthy's partner at his office
- Supriya - the girl with whom Murthy falls in love
- Kalyani - Murthy's wife
- Gunavathi - Murthy's secretary
- Kothari - Murthy's uncle
- Andal Roja - Murthy's daughter
