= Khagantak =

Glide bomb

- Type: Smart glide bomb
- Place of origin: India

Production history
- Designer: Shirish Baban Deo
- Designed: 2013–present
- Manufacturer: JSR Dynamics; Bharat Electronics Limited
- Produced: 2025–present
- Variants: K-225-LW; K-243; K-306; K-450; K-720; K-1260

Specifications
- Mass: K-225-LW: 243 kg (536 lb); K-243: 300 kg (660 lb); K-450: 540 kg (1,190 lb); K-720: 720 kg (1,590 lb); K-1260: 1,350 kg (2,980 lb)
- Length: K-243: ≤4 m (13 ft); K-450: ≤4.2 m (14 ft); K-720: ≤4.7 m (15 ft); K-1260: ≤5 m (16 ft)
- Diameter: K-243: 290 mm (11 in); K-450: 360 mm (14 in); K-720: 405 mm (15.9 in); K-1260: 540 mm (21 in)
- Wingspan: K-243, K-450: ≤ 3 m; K-720, K-1260: ≤ 4 m
- Warhead: Blast-fragmentation (Mark-80 series: Mk-81, Mk-82, Mk-83 and Mk-84
- Warhead weight: K-225-LW: 108 kg (238 lb); K-243: 125 kg (276 lb)
- Operational range: K-225-LW: 180 km (110 mi); K-243: >140 km (87 mi); K-306: 175 km (109 mi); K-450, K-720: >120 km (75 mi); K-1260: >100 km (62 mi)
- Flight altitude: 12 km at 0.85 Mach
- Guidance system: Mid-course: INS + multi-GNSS; Terminal: INS + GNSS / Passive Homing Head / EO + IR (Optional)
- Accuracy: <10 m CEP (without seeker); <5 m CEP (with seeker)
- Launch platform: Su-30 MKI, MiG-29K

The Khagantak is a family of airborne stand-off precision-guided smart glide bombs developed by Nagpur based startup JSR Dynamics in collaboration with Indian defence public sector company Bharat Electronics Limited. It was initially shown as a prototype at Aero India 2019 and was intended to be a low-cost penetration weapon for both domestic and export use. Different payloads or seekers can be added to the weapon, depending on the end user's requirements. It is part of a universal advanced guided weapons project that seeks to improve the air-to-surface attack capability of combat aircraft operating in contested airspace.

== History ==
The Vice Chief of the Indian Air Force, Air Marshal (retd) Shirish Baban Deo, began developing a family of cruise missiles and glide munitions, including the long-range stand-off weapon Khagantak, the light-weight cruise missile VEL, and the stand-off glide munition Waghnak, in an attempt to create universal advanced guided weapons that give combat aircraft operating in contested airspace an improved air-to-surface attack capability. While serving in the Indian Air Force at Jodhpur Air Force Station, Shirish Baban Deo started doing research in his private laboratory. The lab received ₹10 lakh from the Defence Research and Development Organization following a visit by A. P. J. Abdul Kalam. For more than 12 years, the research and development work continued. Khagantak-225-LW weighs 243 kg and have a range of 180 km. The glide munition will have a low radar cross section for enhanced stealth, sophisticated guidance systems, and a 108 kg warhead. JSR Dynamics designed the body and control systems for the project, while Bharat Electronics provided all of the electronics and guidance subsystems. According to the development team, 90% of the subsystems are made in India, with the remaining 10% being imported. For the weapon system, a ten-year service life is anticipated. A memorandum of understanding for warheads, glide weapons, and lightweight cruise missiles was signed by JSR Dynamics and Economic Explosives Limited in June 2019.

== Development ==
The Khagantak family of glide bombs are intended to increase the operational range of Mark-80 series warheads. Khagantak's modular architecture allows it to integrate warheads of any size, from the smaller Mk-81 to the larger Mk-84, depending on mission requirements. Khagantak has a multi-mode passive homing head, electro-optical, and infrared seeker. The EO/IR seeker's broad field of view enables autonomous target recognition, identification, and tracking at long distances using thermal and visual signatures. The PHH makes it possible to passively target air defense, radar, and electronic warfare assets.

The seeker in Khagantak recognizes targets using artificial intelligence. Khagantak can travel 180 kilometers when released from a 12 km altitude. JSR Dynamics is responsible for developing the AI algorithms for the seeker, wing design, and some of the warhead combinations internally. The Khagantak-243 has five aft control surfaces and a cylindrical body with swivel-type mid-body glide wings. Having 125 kg of explosive charges, it contains a Mk-81 general-purpose blast-fragmentation warhead. An upgraded, longer-range model, the Khagantak-306 has updated guidance systems and redesigned control surfaces. Glide bombs from the Khagantak family have jamming-resistant satellite navigation, which guarantees efficient operation in areas without GPS. The glide bombs can function in temperatures between -40°C and +70°C and are compatible with the MIL-STD-1760 standard. It took more than a decade for Khagantak's development to complete, and the company has obtained a prototype and manufacturing contract, according to Bharat Electronics Limited officials. Initial flight testing is scheduled to start in mid-2025, and after that serial production will follow. The IAF's Su-30MKI will be the first aircraft to test the Khagantak-243 followed by other aircraft like the MiG-29K.

On 2 September 2026, the Indian Air Force conducted the maiden drop test of Khagantak-243 Long Range Glide Bomb while all mission objectives were met.

== Manufacturing ==
A memorandum of understanding was agreed upon on 20 February 2019, between Bharat Electronics Limited and JSR Dynamics Pvt Ltd, for the marketing and mass production of Khagantak and other jointly developed weapon systems. The development unit of JSR Dynamics has been established at the Hingna Industrial Estate of Maharashtra Industrial Development Corporation. The MIHAN Special Economic Zone will be the location of the manufacturing facility. Bharat Electronics Limited notified Janes on 11 February 2025, that it had obtained an order from the Indian Air Force to provide an undetermined quantity of Khagantak-243 munitions during Aero India 2025.

== User ==
- (India) Indian Air Force: Unspecified number ordered.

== Export ==
The Times of India stated on 28 February 2019, that JSR Dynamics is in preliminary discussions with Vietnam regarding the weapon's export.
