= Vijay Chithiram =

- Genre: Television Film
- Original language: Tamil
- No. of seasons: 1
- No. of episodes: 7

Production
- Camera setup: Multi-camera
- Running time: 120 minutes

Original release
- Network: Star Vijay
- Release: 8 August 2015 – 2015

Vijay Chithiram is a Tamil Television film show that aired on Vijay TV. The show premiered on 8 August 2015 and ended in the same year and aired every Saturday at afternoons. The show brings.out the words written by famous writers into reality consisting of seven parts. The literature by various writers which haven't reached out to the people are being made into a video, to make sure that the words of the writers reaches each and everyone.

== Titles and stories ==
The seven part series aired during Saturdays with each part per Saturday based on the following novels:

- Meher : A story of a devout Muslim mother, caught between her principles in life and her daughter's impending marriage.
- Irandam Aatam : The middle-age crisis that grips this household as the wife struggles to keep the husband real and grounded.
- Mari : The story revolves around the trial and tribulations that an orphan teenage school girl faces in school and society
- Thavalaik Kannan : A twisted tale of friendship of two classmates- a politician and the other his secretary.
- Ganesh Vasanth : The popular detectives Ganesh and Vasanth come to life on television from writer Sujatha's famous novel of the same name.
- Antha Oru Nimidam : A spine-chilling crime thriller about a psychopath on the run.
- Panchapakesan Devasagayam : The quirky panchapakesan Devasagayam solves the recurring murders in the coffee estates of Ooty.
