= Kolaiyuthir Kaalam (novel) =

Novel by Sujatha

Kolaiyuthir Kalam
- Kolaiyuthir Kalam
- Author: Sujatha
- Language: Tamil
- Genre: Novel
- Publisher: Uyirmmai Pathippagam
- Publication place: India

Kolaiyuthir Kalam (transl. "Season of Murders" or "It's Raining Corpses" (the title is a play on words)) is a thriller novel by Sujatha. It is another interesting story featuring Ganesh-Vasanth duo. The story was written in the early 80's and involves high-tech scientific concepts which were very new to that period. It was made into a television serial and aired on Doordarshan's Podhigai channel.

== Plot ==
Ganesh, a famous attorney, and Vasanth, his assistant, visit a rural farm to settle an inheritance issue because their client, the seventeen-year-old Leena, will inherit the farm when she turns eighteen. Her uncle, Kumara Vyasan, is her guardian until that time. The will dictates that the farm cannot be divided or sold and can be inherited only by direct heirs when they turn eighteen years of age. Close relatives are supposed to be guardians. Ganesh and Vasanth are told that Leena was possessed by a spirit when she was fifteen and killed a boy by drinking his blood and that Kumara Vyasan buried the body to conceal this. They were also told that the townspeople believe that a spirit comes every two years to kill people. Though Kumara Vyasan claims that Leena commits murders while possessed by a spirit, Ganesh suspects that Kumara Vyasan is masterminding the suspicious events in order to eliminate Leena so that he can inherit. Ganesh does not accept supernatural causes and searches for a rational explanation. He visits the farm with Vasanth at night and near the lake they see an apparition of a girl resembling Leena. They also hear voices in empty rooms. Many other mysterious occurrences at the farm terrify both of them. However during the course of investigation Kumara Vyasan is murdered. Ganesh and Vasanth disagree over the cause of the events. Ganesh tries to prove all the incidents are perpetrated by human efforts to mislead everyone, and Vasanth tries to prove everything is caused by supernatural forces. Circumstances point to Leena as the killer but her naïveté confuses Ganesh. He had been skeptical about the existence of ghosts, but circumstances slowly change his mind as all assumptions of science collapse. He starts to believe that the real explanation of all the incidents is the Spirit. The story's end is inconclusive, not indicating to the reader whether the cause was supernatural or not.

== Key Characters ==
- Ganesh (lawyer) - Lawyer
- Vasanth - Lawyer and Junior of Ganesh
- KumaraVyasan - Guardian of Legal Heir
- Leena - Legal Heir who inherits Millions of Rupees Property
- Deepak - Friend later husband of Leena who arranges Ganesh and Vasanth to visit the farm
- Periya Kannu - Gardener of the farm
- Prof Ramabathran - One who gives expert advice about Holography and play a vital role in the end.

== Film adaptation ==
Director Balaji Kumar bought the film rights of the novel for ₹10 lakh (US$10,000). The film was released in 2019 under the same title.
