= Sujatha (writer) =

Indian screenwriter and novelist

- Born: S. Rangarajan; 3 May 1935; Srirangam, Trichinopoly District, Madras Presidency, British India (present day Tiruchirappalli, Tamil Nadu, India)
- Died: 27 February 2008 (aged 72); Chennai, Tamil Nadu, India
- Education: Madras Institute of Technology
- Occupations: Engineer, author, novelist, screenwriter
- Spouse: Sujatha (m. 1963)
- Children: 2
- Writing career
- Pen name: Sujatha
- Period: 1958-2008

S. Rangarajan (3 May 1935 – 27 February 2008), better known by his allonym Sujatha, was an Indian author, novelist and screenwriter who wrote in Tamil. He authored over 100 novels, 250 short stories, ten books on science, ten stage plays, and a slim volume of poems. He was one of the most popular authors in Tamil literature, and a regular contributor to topical columns in Tamil periodicals such as Ananda Vikatan, Kumudam and Kalki. He had a wide readership, and served for a brief period as the editor of Kumudam, and has also written screenplays and dialogues for several Tamil films.

Rangarajan was also an engineer; he supervised the design and production of the electronic voting machine (EVM) during his tenure at Bharat Electronics Limited (BEL), a machine which is currently used in elections throughout India. As an author he inspired many authors, including Balakumaran, Madhan.

== Career ==
An Electronics-Engineer by profession, he was proficient in the language of technology. Widely read and knowledgeable, he presented his knowledge in simple Tamil.

His works stood out during a time when Tamil writing was dominated by social/family dramas and historical novels. His identification with the masses, and his uncanny adoption of their way of talking, behavior, mindset and slang, helped make him popular across multiple demographic segments.

His popularization of technology was one of his greatest contributions – starting with his Silicon Chip writing in Dinamani Kadhir and Yen, Yedharku, Eppadi in Junior Vikatan. At one point, his writings were appearing in numerous Tamil weeklies and journals simultaneously, including Ananda Vikatan, Kumudam, Kungumam, Kalki and Dhinamani Kadhir. Later he contributed as script/screenplay author for several Tamil movies. His notable movies included Vikram, Thiruda Thiruda, Boys and Sivaji. Most of his early novels/stories were made as movies, including Priya, Gaytri, Karaiyellam Senbagapoo and Anandha Thandavam, among others.

Brought up in Srirangam, Trichy, and having spent most of the later part of life in Bangalore, he described both places vividly in his various writings. Among his popular novels are Pirivom Sandhipom (not related to the movie of the same name), Rathham Ore Niram, and Kolaiyudhir Kaalam.

He also immortalized Ganesh-Vasanth – an imaginary advocate pair serving as the main characters in most of his detective stories. Ganesh is a level-headed, senior advocate and Vasanth is his flirtatious junior advocate. The Ganesh-Vasanth pair was based on James Hadley Chase's characters, Vic Malloy and his sidekick.

In his later days he restricted his writing to essays such as Katradhum-Petradhum. He began to spend more time reading, especially old rare Tamil literature and writings on the latest developments in information technology and computing.

== Biography ==
Sujatha Rangarajan was born in a Tamil family in Triplicane, Chennai but spent his childhood in Srirangam near Tiruchirapalli under the care of his paternal grandmother owing to his father's frequent transfers in his job.

=== Education ===
Sujatha did his schooling in the Higher Secondary School for Boys, Srirangam and attended the St. Joseph's College, Tiruchirapalli. He graduated in the 1954 batch with a BSc in physics (1952–54). Later he studied engineering in Electronics from Madras Institute of Technology, where he was a friend of Abdul Kalam (who later became the President of India). His writing interests were largely inspired by the short stories and serials published in popular Tamil magazines.

=== Early writings ===
Srirangathu Devathaigal (Angels of Srirangam) is a series of short stories based on incidents in Srirangam during 1940s and 50s which appeared in Ananda Vikatan. Sivaji, a minor magazine from Tiruchirappalli, published a story during his student days. His first short story was published in the Kumudam magazine in 1962. His Kolaiyuthir Kalam was an exciting ghost-themed novel.

=== Engineering career ===
He worked first in Civil Aviation Department of Government of India and later for Bharat Electronics Limited in Bangalore, India before his retirement to Chennai, India, where he lived till his last days. As an engineer, he was a forward thinker and he was the key person behind the development of the Electronic Voting Machine in India. He initiated the development of advanced word processing before the days of personal computers. He is known for coining new Tamil words for computer terms like password, file, directory, etc. These words have been adopted by many software companies of today for translating their software/software products to Tamil.

== Works ==
- Nil, Kavani, Thaakku (1970)
- En Iniya Iyanthira
- Ore Oru Throgam (1983)
- Meendum Jeano (1987) - Sequel to En Iniya Iyanthira
- Virumbi Sonna Poigal (1987)
- Ilamaiyil Kol (1987)
- Ainthavathu Athiyayam (2000)
- Kolaiyuthir Kalam
- Adhalinaal Kaadhal Seiveer
- Sorga Theevu
- Karaiyellam Shenbagapoo - later adapted into film with Karaiyellam Shenbagapoo (1981)
- Niramatra Vanavil
- Kolai Arangam
- Meendum Oru Kutram
- Thoondil Kathaigal
- Computer Gramam
- Oru Naduppagal Maranam
- Maelum Oru Kuttram
- Thanga Mudichu
- Rayil Punnagai
- Sivandtha Kailkal
- Manaivi Kidaithal
- Pirivom Sandhippom
- Srirangaththu Devadhaigal
- Mathyamar
- Singaramayangar
- Ullam Thuranthavan
- Thedathey
- Vairangal
- Vizhundha Natchaththiram
- Amuthavum Avanum - later adapted into the movie format with Kannathil Muthamittal (2002)
- 6961
- Andru Un Arukil

== Awards ==
- Sujatha received an award from Government of India's National Council for Science and Technology in 1993 for making science accessible to the public through his books, magazine contributions and other media.
- VASVIK Award for Electronic Voting Machine.
- Kalaimamani Award from the Tamil Nadu Government.
- Mylapore Academy award for Doordharshan best serial "Mahan Ramanujar".
- Best Writer Award from Tamil Nadu Cinema Kalaimandram in the year of 1999.

== Style and influence ==
Sujatha was a versatile Tamil author, with several short stories, novels, poems, plays, screenplays for movies, articles on popular science and other non-fiction articles, to his credit. Sujatha wrote a number of sci-fi stories in Tamil and sought to explain science in simple terms to the layman. He would routinely answer science questions in magazines like Junior Vikatan. His science FAQ has been released as separate books called Yen Etharku Eppadi and Athisaya Ulagam by Vikatan Publications.

He worked on "Katradhum, Petradhum" in Anantha Vikatan and "Sujatha Bathilgal" in Kumudam and Kungumam.

== Death ==
Sujatha, who had been suffering from diabetes and had undergone a bypass heart surgery, died of multiple organ failure at Apollo hospital.

== Filmography ==
He extended his writing skills and expertise from science to movies. The first of these efforts were Gaayathri and Priya. In Priya, his fictional character Ganesh was played by Rajinikanth. Kamal Haasan's Vikram was written by him. He penned dialogues for the movie Roja, directed by Maniratnam. In recent times he has been associated with Mani Ratnam (for Kannathil Muthamittal, Aayitha Ezhuthu, etc.), Shankar (for Indian, Mudhalvan, Boys, Sivaji: The Boss and Enthiran: The Robot) and Azhagam Perumal in Udhaya. He was also a co-producer for the banner Media Dreams, which went on to produce the critically acclaimed Bharathi, a biopic of the great Tamil poet Bhaarathiyaar.

He was working on Shankar's Enthiran before he died on 27 February 2008.

=== Films ===
As Writer

Year	Movie	Story	Dialogues	Notes
1977	Gaayathri	Yes	No	
1978	Priya	Yes	No	
1979	Yaarukku Yaar Kaaval	Yes	No	Adapted from novel Jannal Malar
1979	Ninaithale Inikkum	Yes	Yes	
1981	Karaiyellam Shenbagapoo	Yes	No	
1981	Onti Dhwani	Yes	No	Kannada film
1986	Poi Mugangal	Yes	No	
1986	Unnidathil Naan	Yes	Yes	
1986	Vikram	Yes	Yes	
1992	Nadodi Thendral	No	Yes	
1992	Roja	No	Yes	
1993	Thiruda Thiruda	No	Yes	
1996	Indian	No	Yes	
1998	Uyire	No	Yes	
1998	Kannedhirey Thondrinal	No	Yes	
1999	Mudhalvan	No	Yes	
1999	Aryabhata	Yes	No	Kannada film
2000	Kandukondain Kandukondain	No	Yes	
2001	Nila Kaalam	Yes	Yes	
2002	Kannathil Muthamittal	No	Yes	
2003	Whistle	No	Yes	
2003	Boys	No	Yes	
2004	Chellame	No	Yes	
2004	Aayutha Ezhuthu	No	Yes	
2004	Kangalal Kaidhu Sei	No	Yes	
2004	Udhaya	No	Yes	
2004	The Legend of Buddha	No	Yes	English film
2005	Ullam Ketkumae	No	Yes	
2005	Anniyan	No	Yes	
2005	Gulliver's Travel	Yes	No	English film
2007	Sivaji	No	Yes	
2009	Ananda Thandavam	Yes	Yes	Posthumous release Adapted from novel Pirivom Santhippom
2010	Enthiran	No	Yes	Posthumous release Co-dialogue written by Madhan Karky and S. Shankar

As Producer

- Bharathi (2000)
- Little John (2001)
- Nila Kaalam (2001)
- Pandavar Bhoomi (2001)

== See also ==
- List of Indian writers
- Abdul Rasheed
