= Weapon systems engineering in the United States =

Use of engineering to ensure safety and performance of weapons

Weapon systems engineering involves using engineering tools in technology to create and guarantee the safety and performance of weapons. It is currently being used by the U.S. military and government to create new weapons to protect the United States. It is used to make nuclear and non-nuclear weapons and ensure their safety throughout their lifespan.

== Companies involved ==
Many companies help the U.S. government and military to manufacture new weapons and strategies. One of them, is Parsons. The Missile Defense Agency, MDA, is a research agency that develops and tests the missile defence agency to defend the United States and its allies. Parsons helps with this through the MDA missile contract. They provide missile system support including tests and evaluating the performance.

The U.S. Navy awarded multi-million-dollar contracts with Tekla Research and Avian-Precise Co. to support the "Naval Air Systems Command's Systems Engineering Department". Tekla is to help NAVAIR assess technology, cost, and design. Avian-Precise is to help the command sustain a weapons system related to all U.S. naval platforms and systems.

== Inventions ==
The electromagnetic railgun launcher is a new long-range weapon using electricity instead of chemicals to launch projectiles. Projectiles can be launched at approximately 4,500 miles per hour using magnetic fields. These new weapons are allowing the military to eliminate explosives where possible. It is being used by the Navy as well for its ability to be effective and affordable. The Navy is working on modernizing their weapons, including nuclear weapons. Two weapons on the list to work on creating are a "low-yield warhead for submarine-launched ballistic missiles" and a "nuclear capable submarine-launched cruise missile".

The U.S. Army is using Weapons Systems Engineering to help protect its soldiers. They have designed a Humvee to be equipped to contain a gun with an automated tracking system. This would be controlled by another soldier or a computer program. This along with other new systems, vehicles, etc. is all possible because of the new advancements in Weapon Systems Engineering. In May the Army will test out automated Humvee's to certify them as combat ready vehicles. According to the Army Tank Automotive Research, Development and Engineering Center (TARDEC) this is the first step toward weaponized robotics. The Army is not looking to make killing machines, but machines controlled by humans.

The US Air Force Research Lab (AFRL) assigned Lockheed Martin the job of creating "an aircraft-mounted high-power fibre laser". They must make a weapon that is small enough and light enough, but also can be effective. The laser will be mounted on jet fighters with the ability to disable enemies targeting systems.
