= Mikoyan MiG-29M =

Strike fighter aircraft project

MiG-29M
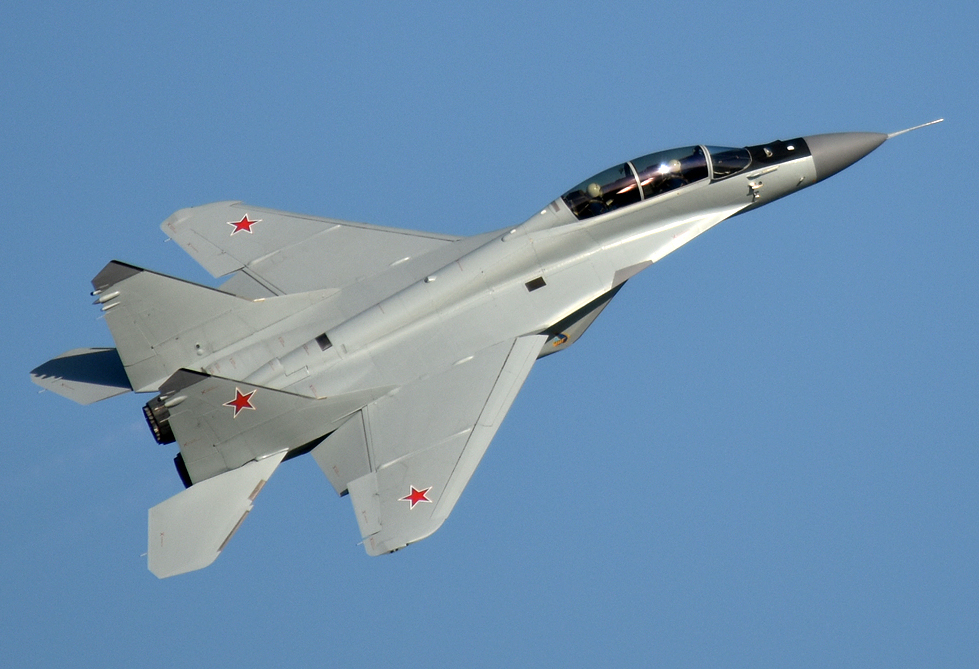
- A Russian MiG-29M2

General information
- Type: Multirole fighter
- National origin: Russia
- Manufacturer: United Aircraft Corporation
- Designer: Mikoyan
- Status: In service
- Primary users: Egyptian Air Force Algerian Air Force

History
- Introduction date: 2017
- First flight: 24 December 2011
- Developed from: Mikoyan MiG-29
- Developed into: Mikoyan MiG-35

The Mikoyan MiG-29M (Russian: Микоян МиГ-29M; NATO reporting name: Fulcrum-E) is a Russian multirole fighter that first flew in 2005. The unified platform that is the MiG-29 is now comprised by the MiG-29M and a naval carrier variant, the MiG-29K. A direct predecessor of the MiG-29M, sometimes known informally as the "MiG-33", was developed by the Mikoyan design bureau in the mid-1980s.

== Development ==
In the mid-1980s, a development of the original MiG-29 was proposed to meet the Soviet western frontline requirement. It was required to be a multirole fighter for the frontline defensive air force to gain offensive strike ability. This development resulted in a single-seat and a two-seat variant. The proposal was then grounded as a result of shifts in military strategy. The model was named "MiG-33" and later received the MiG-29ME designation for the export market in the mid-1990s. A two-seat model of the standard, commonly known as the MiG-29MRCA, was the MAPO-MiG's primary contender for many international fighter aircraft bids, later evolved into the Mikoyan MiG-35. Six of these models were built before 1990. They were constantly upgraded with various components and one received experimental vector thrust engines which eventually became the MiG-29OVT.

Current land-based model with designation MiG-29M is shares avionic and other components with the carrier-based MiG-29K and now belongs to the "new unified family" instead of the "MiG-29 fighters family" which comprise the older variants. MiG-29M2 represents two–seat variant of MiG-29M.

=== MiG-33 ===
During the early 1990s, it became briefly popular for Sukhoi and Mikoyan to assign new designations for upgraded models to make them appear "new and improved" instead of just "improved". The VVS did not accept these marketing designations and most were soon dropped. Following Sukhoi's initiative in this approach, Mikoyan's first such offering was the MiG-29ME, which first publicly appeared as the MiG-33 at the 1994 Farnborough Airshow. The MiG-29ME was the export version of the MiG-29M (Product 9.15) "Super Fulcrum", a comprehensively upgraded, fully multirole version of the MiG-29.

Although the MiG-33 designation was soon dropped, the MiG-29M may have merited a new designation in that it is in many ways a thoroughly redesigned version of the MiG-29. While external differences are few, the MiG-29M was a fully "multifunctional" fighter capable of performing air-to-ground combat with precision-guided munitions (PGMs), along with air-to-air roles of earlier MiG-29 versions. Pilot-aircraft interfaces in the cockpit were also improved and a wide range of new-generation equipment installed. The aircraft's internal fuel capacity was also increased to add combat range.

=== Procurement ===
In November 2013, it was reported that Egypt and Russia were negotiating an order of 24 MiG-29M/M2s for the Egyptian Air Force. In April 2015, Egypt became the first export customer when it signed a $2 billion contract for the purchase of 46 MiG-29M/M2 multi-role fighters On 26 October it was reported that Algeria become second country outside Russia to procure the MiG-29M. In March 2021 there were talks between Argentina and Russia regarding the purchase of MiG-29M and MiG-35.

== Design ==
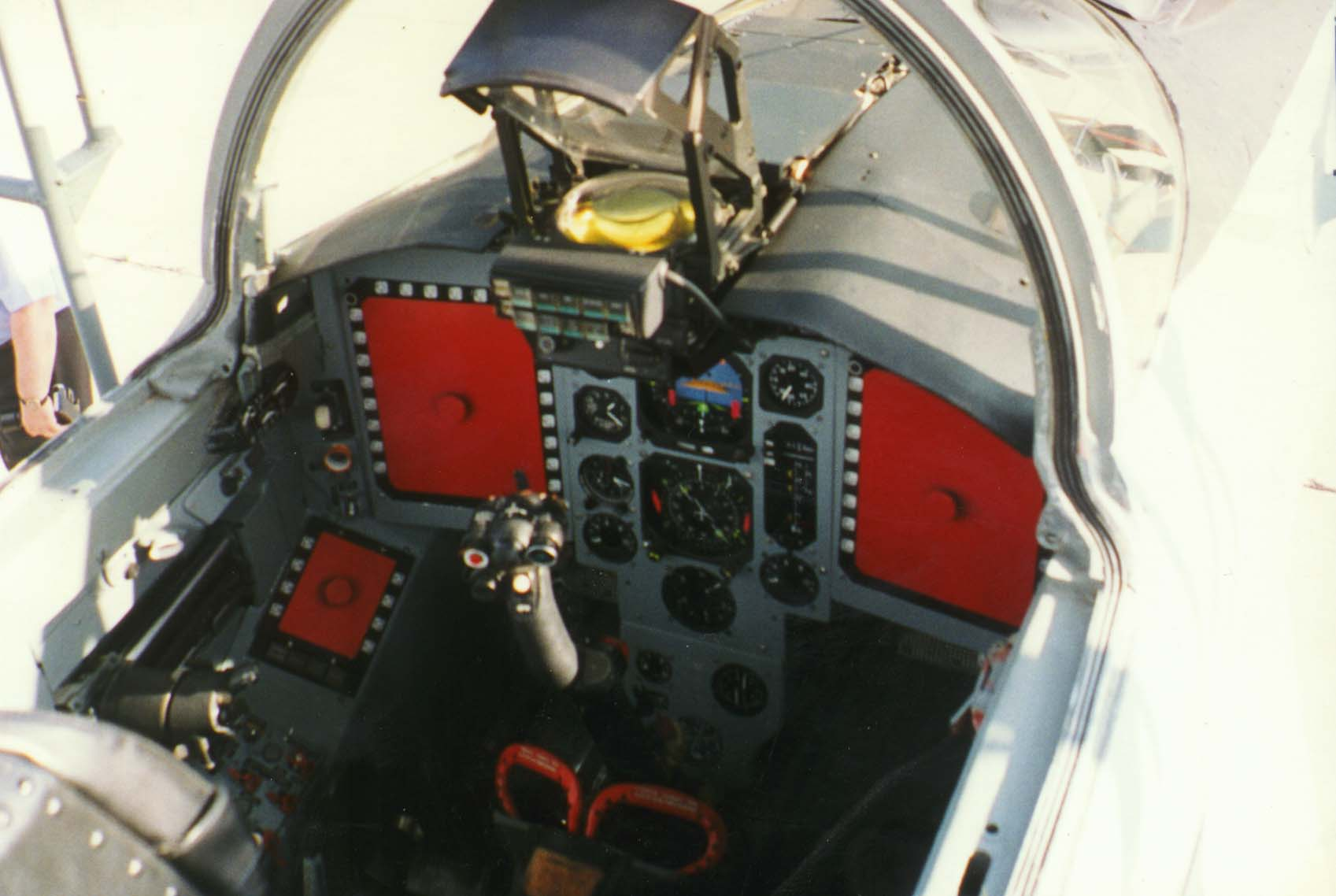
Cockpit of a MiG-29M at MAKS 1997

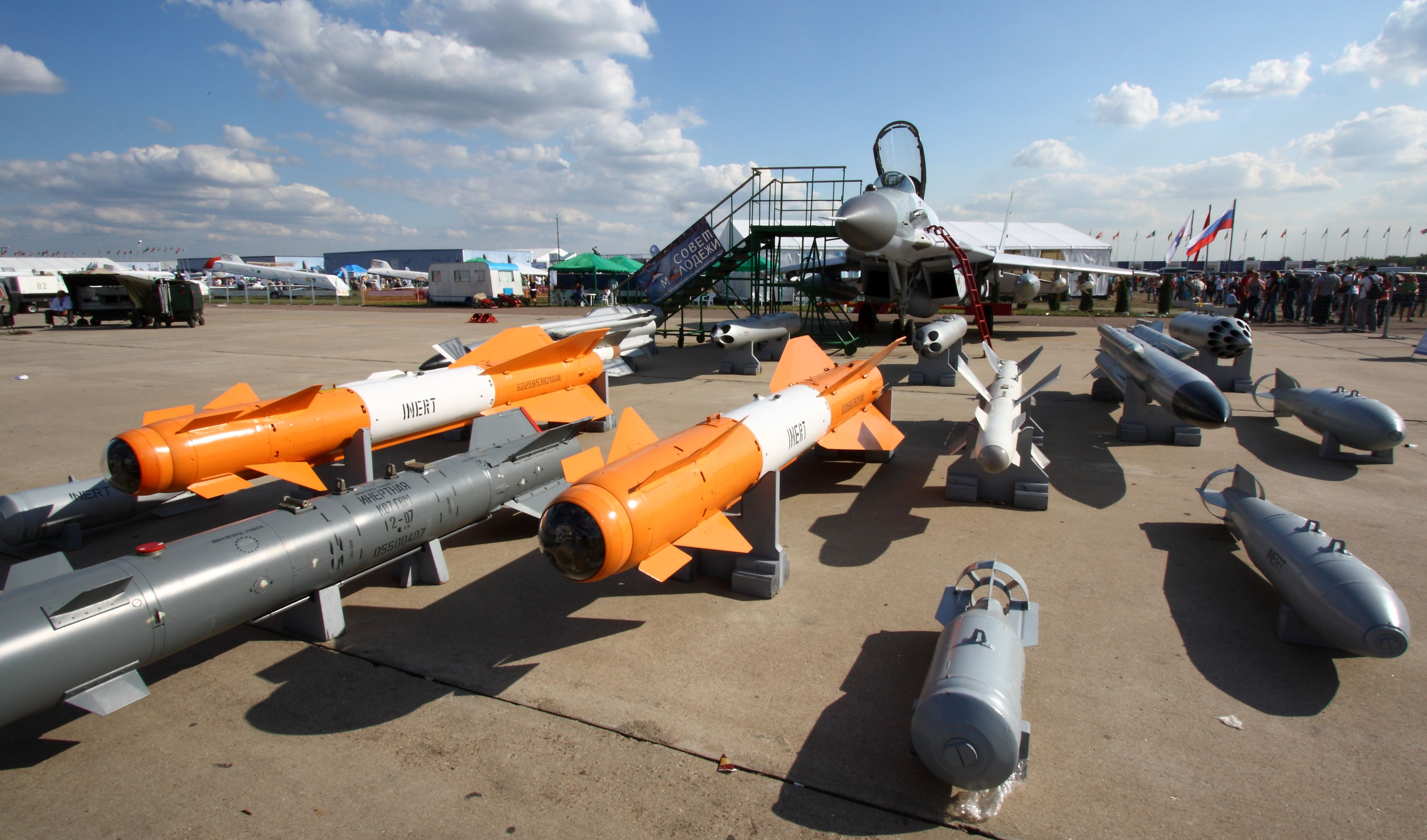
Weapons load display of a MiG-29SMT at MAKS 2011

The MiG-29M/M2 aircraft is a revision of the basic MiG-29. It achieved a more multi-role capability with enhanced use of air-to-air and air-to-ground high-precision weapons. It also featured a considerably increased combat range, owing to an increase in its internal fuel capacity.

A few changes took place during the aircraft's development. The redesigned airframe was constructed from a lightweight Aluminium-lithium alloy to increase the thrust-to-weight ratio. The air intake ramps' geometry was revised, the upper intake louvers were removed to make way for more fuel in the LERXs, mesh screens introduced to prevent foreign object damage (FOD) and inlet dimensions were enlarged for higher airflow.

The aircraft is built with an inflight-refueling (IFR) probe and is able to carry three fuel drop tanks. The redesigned airframe also significantly increased internal fuel capacity in the dorsal spine and LERXs fuel tanks. These give the single-seat aircraft an operational range of 2,000 km with internal fuel, 3,200 km with three fuel drop tanks, and 6,000 km with three drop tanks and inflight refueling.

=== Powerplant ===
The RD-33MK, the latest revision of the RD-33, has 7% more power in comparison to the baseline model due to the use of modern materials on the cooled blades, and provides a thrust of 9,000 kgf. In response to longtime criticism, the new engines are smokeless and contain improvements that reduce its infrared visibility. Thrust vectoring nozzles are now offered upon customer's request. Dry weight is 1,145 kilograms (2,520 lb) compared to the baseline model through modern materials used on the cooled blades, although it retains the same length and maximum diameter. Incorporated is an infrared and optical signature visibility reduction system. Service life has been increased to 4,000 hours.

=== Sensors ===
Main upgrades consist of the Zhuk-ME pulse-Doppler airborne radar, along with revised IRST systems, a helmet-mounted target designation system and electronic countermeasures. According to PHAZOTRON's product brochure, new radar is capable of detecting air targets at ranges up to 80 km, track-while-scan of ten targets, track four targets and attack two targets at a time.

== Operational history ==
=== Algeria ===
Algeria procured 14 MiG-29M/M2 fighters according to a contract signed in 2019 during the MAKS international military fair. Deliveries started in October 2020.

=== Egypt ===
Egypt signed a contract for 46 MiG-29M/M2 in April 2015, with deliveries to be completed by 2020. The Egyptian variant is designated as the MiG-29M (9.41SM) for the single seater, and MiG-29M2 (9.47SM) for the two seater. They are in many aspects similar to the MiG-35, which was first displayed in Lukhovitsy in January 2017.

The Egyptian MiG's include the upgraded RD-33MK smokeless engines, Zhuk-ME pulse-doppler radar, latest OLS-UE electro-optical targeting station, which feeds both TV and IR imagery to the cockpit display and includes a laser rangefinder, unlike previous IRSTs installed on MiG-29s that only featured IR imagery, and the T220/e targeting pod, allowing the utilization of precision-guided munitions, as well as unguided bombs with a low circular error probability. For electronic warfare purposes, the aircraft will be supplied with the MSP-418K active jammer pod which uses DRFM technology to spoof radar-guided missiles. The pod was previously displayed at MAKS air shows and is yet to enter service with the Russian Air Force.

The country received its first batch of MiG-29M/M2s in April 2017, and by the end of the year had 15 aircraft in its inventory. A proposed modernization is intended to follow in 2020, providing refinements to the airborne radar, software and other avionics. The Egyptian Air Force is expected to keep its MiG-29Ms in service until 2060.

On 3 November 2018, an Egyptian Air Force MiG-29M crashed due to a technical malfunction when on a routine training flight. The pilot ejected safely.

On 5 December 2019, an Egyptian Air Force MiG-29M crashed due to a malfunction while on a military training flight southwest of Alexandria. The pilot ejected safely.

==== Egyptian presence in Sudan ====
Five of the MiG-29s were at Merowe Air Base at the start of the 2023 Sudan clashes where they were captured by the Rapid Support Forces. By 17 April 2023, satellite imagery appeared to show at least one had been destroyed and two damaged.

=== Upgraded Airframes ===
==== Syria ====
A first contract for 12 of the new fighters was signed in 2007, making the Syrian Air Force the very first client to have ordered the MIG-29M, with deliveries set to be completed by 2012. Syria reportedly agreed to buy 12 additional MiG-29M/M2s in 2012. In July 2012 at the Farnborough Air Show, Russia announced it would not deliver weapons, including combat aircraft, to Syria due to the ongoing Syria Civil War. On 31 May 2013, RSK MiG's director general, Sergei Korotkov, stated that the company plans to sign a contract with Syria to deliver "more than 10" MiG-29 M/M2 and that a Syrian delegation was in Moscow to discuss terms and deadlines of a new contract supplying fighter jets to Syria. At the end of May 2020, a batch of 12 MiG-29SMTs has been delivered. Note that it is unclear if any second generation MiG-29M/M2s were delivered to Syria (MiG-29SMT is an upgrade of first generation MiG-29).

==== Serbia ====
The Serbian Air Force intended to buy several MIG-29M/M2s to replace its aging MiG-21 fleet. In 2013, media reports indicated that Serbia planned to purchase six MiG-29M/M2 fighters. Instead of buying MiG-29M in October 2017, Russia donated six used MiG-29 fighters to the Serbian Air Force, with Serbia paying to upgrade them.

=== Russia ===
On 5 October 2018, a MiG-29 operated by the Gromov Flight Research Institute crashed due to a control system malfunction when on a routine training flight from Zhukovsky International Airport. Both pilots ejected safely.

== Variants ==
MiG-29M (Product 9.41S)

Cancelled single-seat variant for Syria.

MiG-29M2 (Product 9.47S)

Cancelled two-seat variant for Syria.

MiG-29M (Product 9.41SM)

Single-seat model featuring an aerial refueling probe, Zhuk-M1SE radar, I-219/ESM OLS-UE infrared search and track, NSTsI-KOS-SM helmet-mounted display, an I-222SM missile approach warning system and the L150M-02 radar warning receiver.

MiG-29M2 (Product 9.47SM)

Two-seat model featuring an aerial refueling probe, Zhuk-M1SE radar, I-219/ESM OLS-UE infrared search and track, NSTsI-KOS-SM helmet-mounted display, an I-222SM missile approach warning system and the L150M-02 radar warning receiver.

MiG-29UBM (Product 9.61)

Two-seat training variant of the MiG-29M. Never built. Effectively continued under the designation 'MiG-29M2'.

MiG-29M2 / MiG-29MRCA

Two-seat version of MiG-29M. Identical characteristics to MiG-29M, with a slightly reduced ferry range of 1,800 km. RAC MiG presented in various air shows, to name a few, Fifth China International Aviation and Aerospace Exhibition (CIAAE 2004), Aero India 2005, and MAKS 2005. It was once given the MiG-29MRCA designation for marketing purposes and has evolved into the MiG-35. The MiG-29M2's number of the hardpoints increased to nine and maximum external payload increased to 6,500 kg, depends on type of equipment and armament.

== Operators ==
Algeria

- Algerian Air Force – 25 MiG-29M/M2s.

Egypt

- Egyptian Air Force – 46 MiG-29M/M2s ordered in 2015, all delivered.

== Specifications (MiG-29M) ==
Data from Mikoyan, globalsecurity.org, deagel.com, Jane's, Armedconflicts.com, airwar.ru warshistory.ru, redstar.gr, and migavia.ru

General characteristics

- Crew: 1 or 2
- Length: 17.37 m (57 ft 0 in)
- Wingspan: 11.99 m (39 ft 4 in)
- Height: 4.4 m (14 ft 5 in)
- Wing area: 42 m^{2} (450 sq ft)
- Empty weight: 11,600 kg (25,574 lb)
- Gross weight: 17,500 kg (38,581 lb)

19,000 kg (41,888 lb) for MiG-29M2

- Max takeoff weight: 26,500 kg (58,422 lb)
- Powerplant: 2 × Klimov RD-33MK afterburning turbofan engines, 88.26 kN (19,840 lbf) with afterburner

Performance

- Maximum speed: 2,100 km/h (1,300 mph, 1,100 kn) / M2.25 at high altitude

1,400 km/h (870 mph; 760 kn) / M1.13 at low altitude

- Range: 2,000 km (1,200 mi, 1,100 nmi)

1,700 km (1,100 mi; 920 nmi) for MiG-29M2

- Ferry range: 3,000 km (1,900 mi, 1,600 nmi) with 3x drop tanks

2,700 km (1,700 mi; 1,500 nmi) for MiG-29M2

- Service ceiling: 16,000 m (52,000 ft)

16,200 m (53,150 ft) for MiG-29M2

- g limits: +8 to +9
- Rate of climb: 330 m/s (65,000 ft/min)
- Wing loading: 442 kg/m^{2} (91 lb/sq ft)
- Thrust/weight: 1.02

Armament

- Guns: 1 × 30 mm Gryazev-Shipunov GSh-30-1 autocannon with 150 rounds
- Hardpoints: 9 × hardpoints (8 × underwing, 1 × fuselage) with a capacity of up to 5,500 kg (12,100 lb) of stores, with provisions to carry combinations of:
  - Rockets:
    - 4 × S-8
    - 6 × S-25
  - Missiles:
    - Air-to-air missiles:
      - 4 × R-73E
      - 4 × R-77
      - 4 × R-27R/ER/T/ET
    - Air-to-surface missiles:
      - 2 × Kh-29L/T/D
    - Anti-ship missiles:
      - 2 × Kh-31A
      - 2 × Kh-35U
    - Anti-radiation missiles:
      - 2 × Kh-31P
  - Bombs:
    - 2 × KAB-500KR TV-guided bombs
    - 2 × KAB-500L laser-guided bombs
    - 2 × KAB-500OD bombs

Avionics

- Phazotron Zhuk-M / Zhuk-ME radar
- OEPS-29 electro-optical targeting system

== See also ==
Related development

- Mikoyan MiG-29K
- Mikoyan MiG-35

Aircraft of comparable role, configuration, and era

- Chengdu J-10A
- Dassault Rafale
- Sukhoi Su-27
- Eurofighter Typhoon
- General Dynamics F-16 Fighting Falcon
- McDonnell Douglas F/A-18 Hornet

Related lists

- List of military aircraft of the Soviet Union and the CIS
- List of fighter aircraft
