= Mikoyan MiG-35 =

Russian fighter aircraft

MiG-35
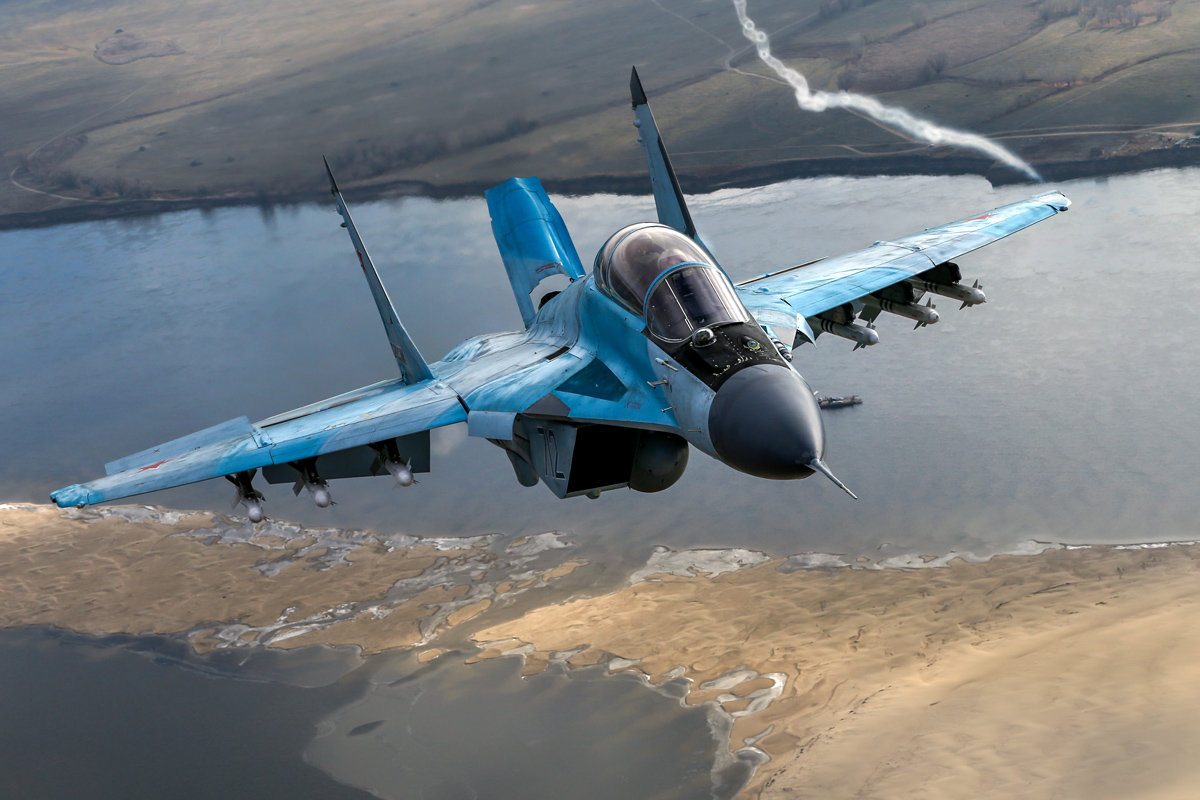
- A pre-series MiG-35UB of the Russian Air Force

General information
- Type: Multirole fighter
- National origin: Russia
- Manufacturer: United Aircraft Corporation
- Designer: Mikoyan
- Status: In service
- Primary user: Russian Aerospace Forces
- Number built: 6+ serial and 2 to 8 test aircraft

History
- Manufactured: 2016–2024
- Introduction date: 17 June 2019
- First flight: December 2016; 9 years ago
- Developed from: Mikoyan MiG-29M; Mikoyan MiG-29K

The Mikoyan MiG-35 (Russian: Микоян МиГ-35; NATO reporting name: Fulcrum-F) is a Russian multirole fighter that is designed by Mikoyan, a division of the United Aircraft Corporation (UAC). Marketed as a 4++ generation jet fighter, it is a further development of the MiG-29M/M2 and MiG-29K/KUB fighters. According to a Russian defense industry source, the Mikoyan MiG-35 is essentially an upgraded variant of the MiG-29KR. Many consider MiG-35 a new name given by Mikoyan for marketing. The first prototype was a modification of the aircraft that previously served as a MiG-29M2 model demonstrator given temporary name MiG-35 but a later prototype was a different model with different equipment that served as the base for the MiG-35 as is known today. Mikoyan first officially presented the MiG-35 internationally during the 2017 Moscow air show; the first two serial production aircraft entered service in 2019. Mikoyan built the aircraft primarily for the export market, but the company secured neither foreign buyers nor substantial domestic orders. This effectively marks the end of the MiG brand as a frontline fighter designer company.

The single-seat version is designated MiG-35S and the two-seat version MiG-35UB. The fighter has vastly improved avionics and weapon systems compared to early variants of MiG-29, notably new precision-guided targeting capability and the uniquely designed optical locator system, which relieves the aircraft from relying on ground-controlled interception systems and enables it to conduct independent multirole missions. Serial production aircraft use a mechanically scanned radar, though there is also an option available for an AESA radar that has been mounted on a testbed. The serial production aircraft does not have thrust vectoring as previously planned, but thrust vectoring nozzles can be installed if the customer requests.

== Development ==
=== Initial design ===
There were references in the late 1980s to a very different design also identified as "MiG-35". This design was a single-engine combat aircraft for air-to-air and secondary air-to-ground roles. According to unidentified Indian sources, the aircraft was evaluated by Indian pilots in the Soviet Union and was probably suggested as an alternative for the Indian LCA being developed at that time.

=== MiG-29/35 for MRCA ===
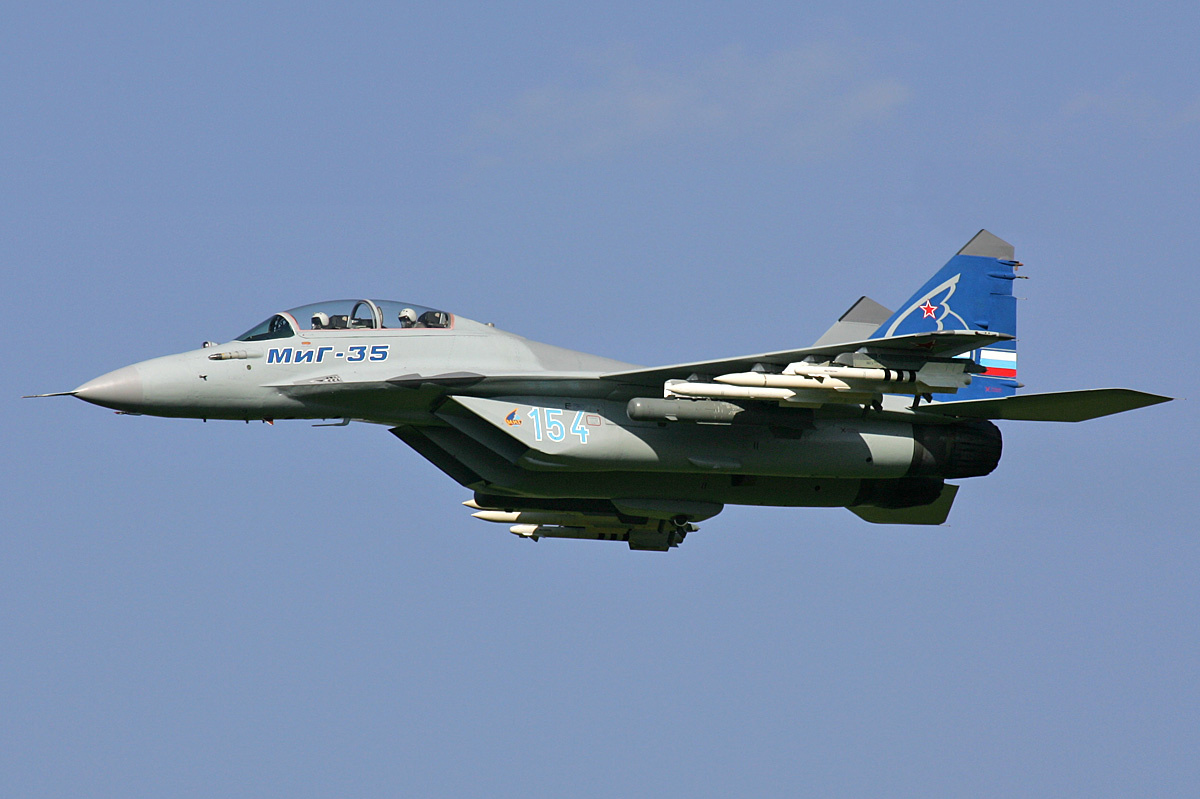
A pre-series MiG-35D at the 2007 Aero India air show

Russia unveiled a model of MiG-29M that was given the temporary name "MiG-35" for marketing and export purposes at the 2007 Aero India air show in Bangalore, India amid Moscow's desire to sell these planes to the nation. The MiG-35 was a contender with the Eurofighter Typhoon, Boeing F/A-18E/F Super Hornet, Dassault Rafale, Saab JAS 39 Gripen, Sukhoi Su-35 and General Dynamics F-16 Fighting Falcon in the Indian MRCA competition for 126 multirole combat aircraft to be procured by the Indian Air Force. Deficiencies with the MiG-35's radar and its RD-33MK engines led to the fighter being ousted from the contest in April 2011.

In May 2013, it was reported that Russia intended to order 37 aircraft.

The state tests of the MiG-35 were to begin in 2017 with completion in mid-2018 after the serial production of the aircraft would have started. According to Viktor Bondarev, Russian Aerospace Forces plan to replace their whole fleet of light fighters with MiG-35s and thus there is a need for at least 170 of such aircraft.

During 2016, the first two pre-production aircraft were being built at the Production Center No.1 in Lukhovitsy. Both aircraft were delivered at the end of the year.

=== New MiG-35 ===
On 26 January 2017, Mikoyan demonstrated the new MiG-35 to Russian Government, in a widely publicized event with subsequent demonstration for export customers was carried out the next day. Significant upgrades on the MiG-35 include a new fly-by-wire flight control system, improved cockpit, upgraded avionics and integrated precision-guided targeting capability for air-to-ground weapons. MiG-35 is fitted with a Russian non-removable NPK-SPP OLS-K electro-optical targeting and surveillance system pod, mounted directly to the aircraft below the right (starboard) fuselage on the engine nacelle in front of the elevators. This marked an overall design philosophy that provides an enhanced degree of operational autonomy on the MiG-35 compared to earlier Russian combat aircraft.

In July 2017, during the MAKS 2017 International Aviation and Space Salon, the Russian Defence Ministry agreed it will buy 24 MiG-35s as a part of the new state armament program for 2018–2027. Six out of the 24 MiG-35s will replace the aging MiG-29s of the Russian Swifts aerobatic team. On 22 August 2018, during the International Military-Technical Forum «ARMY-2018», the first contract for six MiG-35s was signed. The Russian Aerospace Forces plans to sign a second contract for delivery of 14 MiG-35s in 2020.

On 17 June 2019, Russian Aerospace Forces received the first two serially produced MiG-35s, marking the introduction of the variant into service.

On MAKS 2019, Mikoyan unveiled a full scaled mockup of MiG-35 with revised tailfin aimed for export market. According to Tarasenko, the new version features further-refined geometry of the airframe, uprated Klimov RD-33MK engines with thrust at full afterburner of nine tonnes, an advanced electro-optical reconnaissance system, and an active-array (AESA) radar capable of tracking up to 30 targets simultaneously. Additionally, RAC MiG's press release also mentions “renewed mission equipment” and “other improvements made to meet the requirements of potential foreign customers." The mockup also featured a new head-up display with extra-wide field of view, part of a new mission equipment suite from Ramenskoye PKB.

=== Initial flight testing ===
By April 2010, pictures and additional information surfaced of two new MiG-35 demonstrators, the single-seat MiG-35 "961" and the two-seat MiG-35D "967". According to Russian media, they first flew in autumn of 2009, and subsequently took part in MMRCA trials in India in October 2009. Both have a very high commonality with the previous MiG-29K/KUB airframes, an immediate visible difference being the braking parachute installed in place of the hook, present on the naval aircraft. Subsequently, the MiG-35D "967" appears to have been equipped with a similar AESA radar as fitted to the older MiG-35 demonstrator "154", identifiable by the dark grey short nose radome.

On 6 September 2016, according to the general designer of the United Aircraft Corporation Sergei Korotkov, first MiG-35s were to be delivered in November 2016 to the Russian Aerospace Forces for flight testing to confirm the technical characteristics of the aircraft.

On 26 January 2017, MiG officially demonstrated one of the two pre-production aircraft, MiG-35UB "712", to the Russian government, followed by subsequent demonstration for export customers on the next day. The newly presented MiG-35 appeared to be a bit different than the one unveiled in 2007: the aircraft was allegedly equipped with neither AESA radar nor with thrust vectoring control, supposedly to keep procurement cost low so as not to deter foreign customers.

In February 2017, it was announced that a contract was signed to build another two pre-production aircraft that will join the testing. It was also expected state trials will begin at Chkalov State Flight Test Centre in Akhtubinsk the same year. In July 2017, the director general of the MiG, Ilya Tarasenko, told the press: "We are now testing, and after the results will begin mass production. Serial production will begin within the next two years."

In February 2018, MiG Aircraft Corporation announced that it had completed factory trials of the MiG-35, the certificate of the trials completion having been signed in December 2017.

In May 2018, head of the United Aircraft Corporation Yuri Slyusar reported that state trials of the MiG-35 had begun.

In May 2021, MiG-35 has received a preliminary certificate for the limited series production even as it is undergoing state joint trials, Director of the MiG-29M and MiG-35 Aircraft Programs Directorate at the MiG Aircraft Corporation, Musheg Baloyan was quoted as saying by TASS on 5 May 2021.

== Design ==
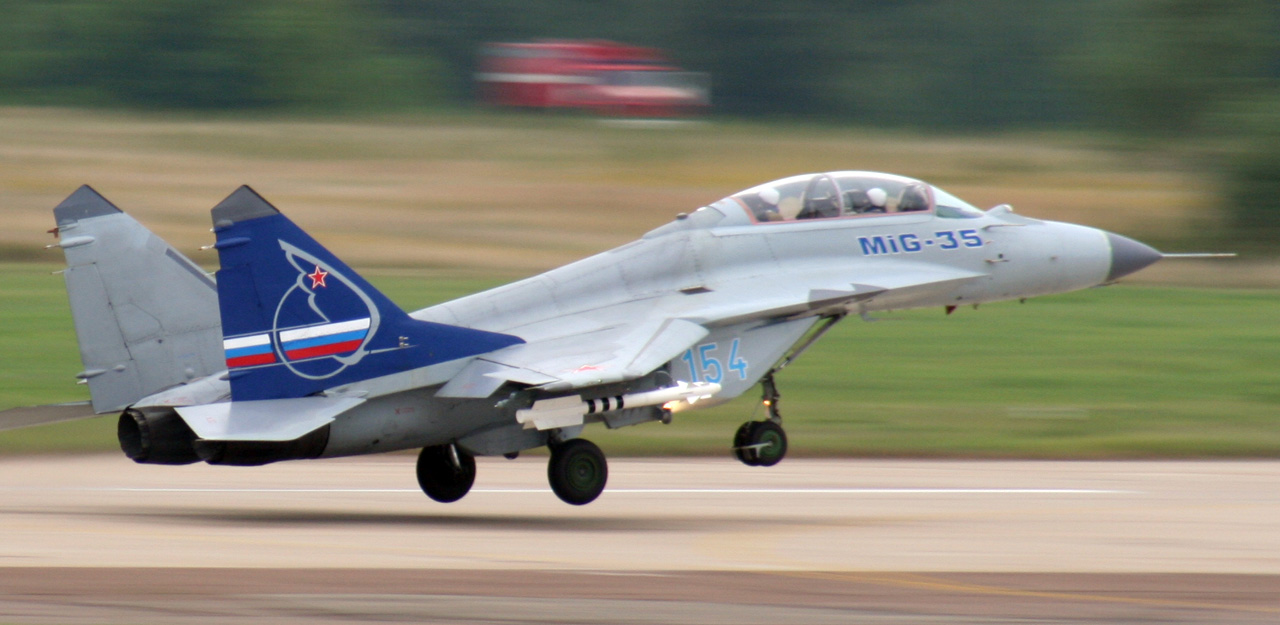
A pre-series MiG-35D taking off

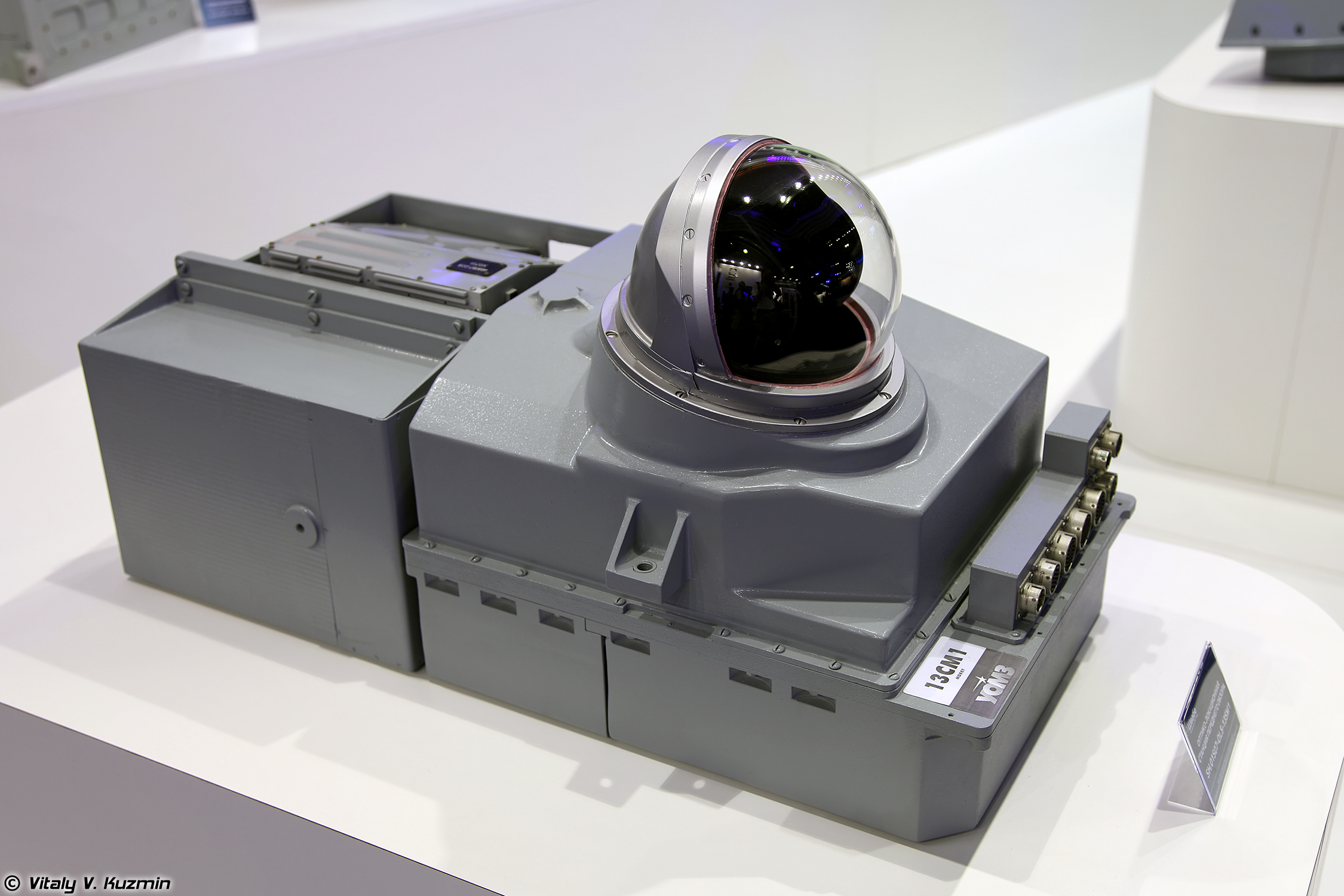
13SM-1 optical-location station of the MiG-35

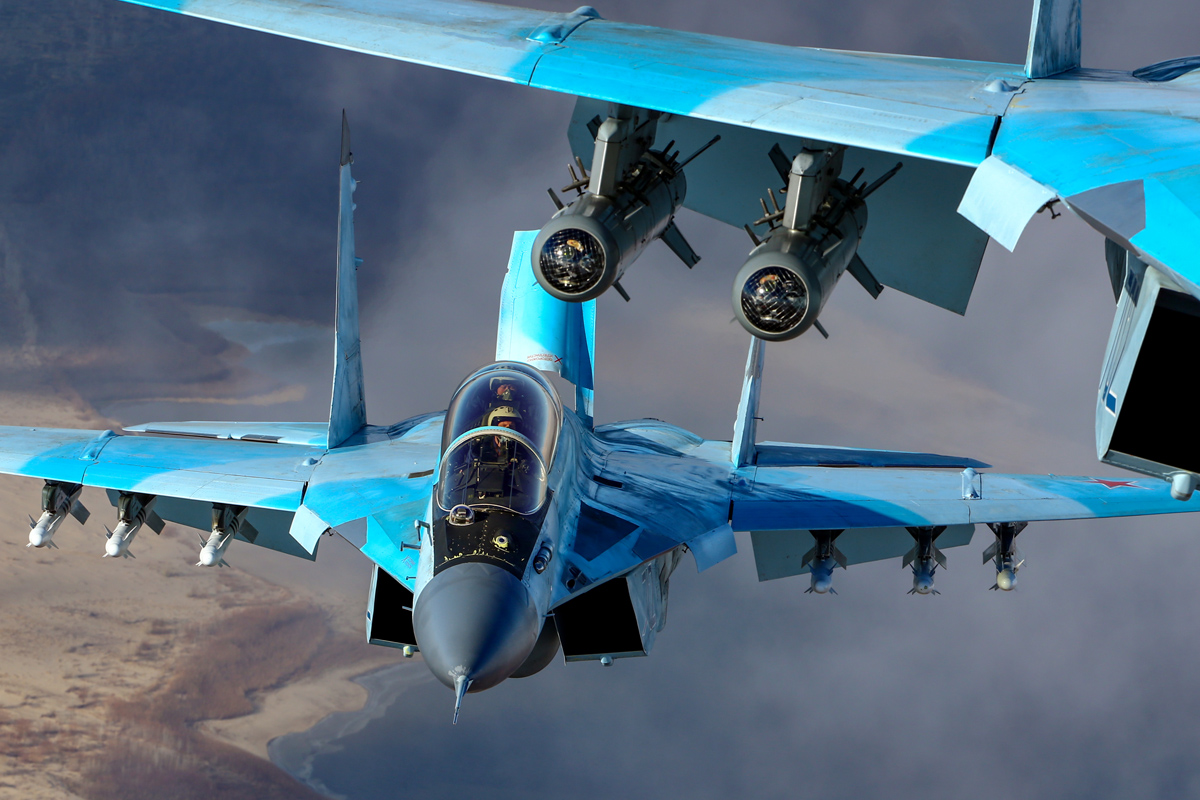
KAB-500KR TV-guided bombs and R-73 air-to-air missiles featured on the MiG-35.

The MiG-35/MiG-35D incorporate advancements of the MiG-29K/KUB and MiG-29M/M2 fighters in combat efficiency enhancement, universality and operational characteristics improvement. The main features of the new design are the fifth-generation information-sighting systems, compatibility with Russian and foreign weapons applications and an integrated variety of defensive systems to increase combat survivability. The new overall design overtakes the design concepts of the baseline model and enables the new aircraft to conduct full-scale multirole missions as their western counterparts.

New avionics are intended to help the MiG-35 gain air superiority as well as to perform all-weather precision ground strikes, aerial reconnaissance with opto-electronic and radar equipment and to conduct complex joint missions. This includes the RD-33MK engines and the newly designed optical locator system, OLS-35. The number of weapon stations has increased to 9 (similar to MiG-29M2), flight range has increased by 50%, and radar visibility has been reduced.

The final configuration of the MiG-35's onboard equipment has been left open intentionally using the MIL-STD-1553 bus. Maximum payload is 6.5 tons.

=== Engines ===
The MiG-35 is powered by two FADEC RD-33MK Morskaya Osa (Russian: Морская Оса, literally: "Sea Wasp" or Chironex fleckeri) turbofans. The RD-33MK is a highly improved variant and the latest version of the Klimov RD-33 turbofan and was intended to power the MiG-29K and MiG-29KUB. It has 7% more power compared to the baseline model due to the use of modern materials in the cooled blades, providing a higher thrust of 9,000 kgf. In response to earlier criticism, the new engines are smokeless and include systems that reduce infrared and optical visibility.

According to episode 160 of the Russian military documentary film "Combat Approved", plans for a thrust vectoring variant of MiG-35 were cancelled due to increased weight ratio and the need to reduce costs. A previously planned thrust vectoring MiG-35 variant was planned to include thrust vectoring nozzles that could direct thrust on two different axes. But Rosoboronexport also stated that, "at customer's request, engine may be equipped with a thrust vectoring nozzle".

=== Armament ===
In January 2017, during a conference call with Russian president Vladimir Putin, Yuri Slyusar, president of the UAC, reported that the MiG-35 could possibly use a kind of laser weaponry in the future. The MiG-35 is also planned to be capable of launching the Kh-36 Grom-1 cruise missile, giving it a long-range strike capability that the MiG-29 does not possess.

=== Cockpit ===
The MiG-35D uses a tandem cockpit while single-seat versions of the MiG-35 uses the rear cockpit to store extra fuel, while retaining a two-seat canopy.

=== Avionics ===
Serial production MiG-35s are now equipped with a mechanically scanned radar of the Zhuk family. Russia also offered Zhuk-A/AM AESA radar for export market. Some sources stated the MiG-35 was to be equipped with the new Phazotron Zhuk-A/AE AESA radar, the first radar of this kind installed on a Russian fighter aircraft.

For detection of targets in the infrared spectrum, the MiG-35 is equipped with the OLS-UEM electro-optical targeting station with lookdown capability against ground, sea and air targets. Its forward-looking infrared (FLIR) sensor is capable to detect airborne threats up to 55 km and provides coverage in azimuth of +/- 90-degree and +60-degree to −15-degree in elevation. The OLS-UEM consists of:

- Infra-red search and track sensor
- TV camera with infrared search and track capability
- Multimode laser rangefinder with detection range up to 20 km

There is also the OLS-K/OLS-KE podded electro-optical targeting system mounted under the right engine nacelle. It is designed to search, detect and track ground and sea targets. The system consists of infrared sensor and TV camera and is capable to detect ground targets up to 20 km and sea targets up to 40 km.

There has been talk for upgraded ability for MiG-35, including automatic landing, G-force protection systems, and voice assistant.

== Operational history ==
=== Russia ===
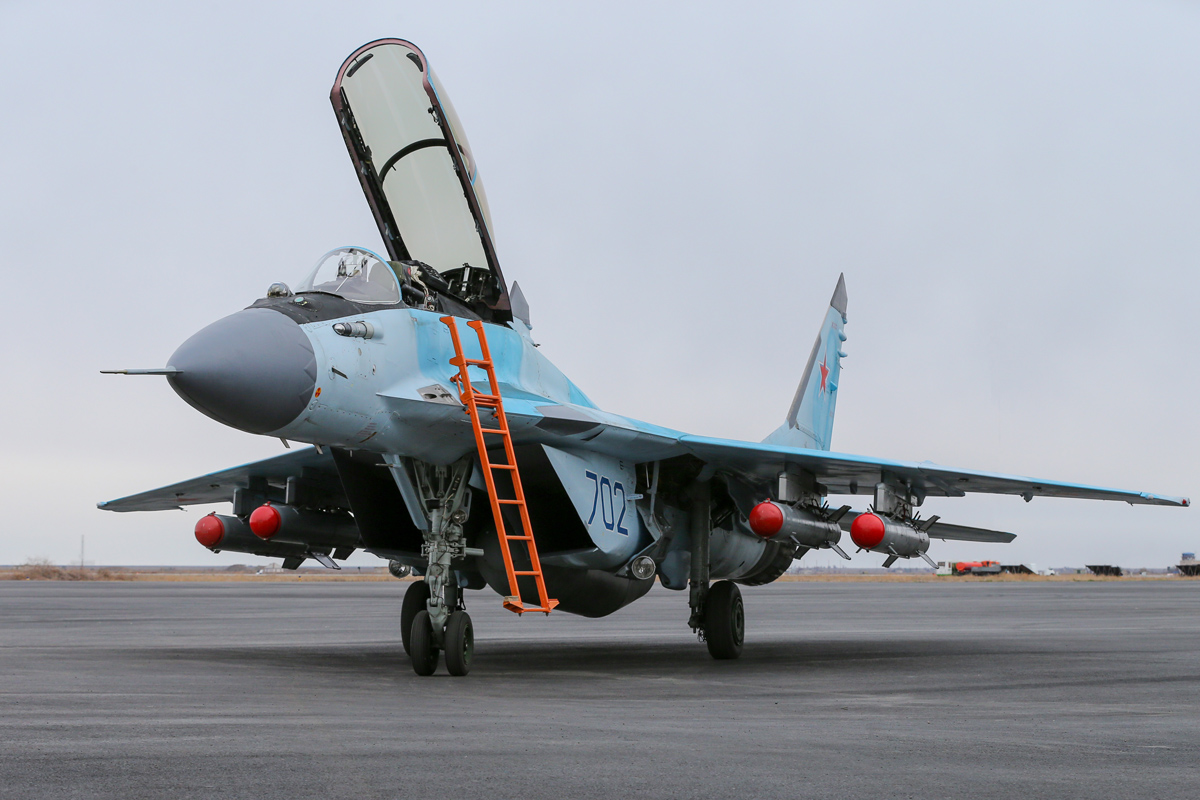
A MiG-35 loaded with KAB-500KR at 929th State Flight Test Centre named for V. P. Chkalov

The Russian Defence Ministry intended to place an order for 37 aircraft in 2013, but the number was reduced to 24 in August 2017. The first batch of six MiG-35s was ordered in August 2018, and first two serial aircraft were delivered to the Russian Aerospace Forces on 17 June 2019.

==== Ukraine War ====
The MiG-35 first saw service during the Russo-Ukrainian war when in May 2025, the Russian MoD confirmed that it had deployed MiG-35s, for their "first known operational use", to defend Moscow from Ukrainian drone strikes.

=== Failed bids ===
==== Egypt ====
In 2014, Egypt planned to sign a large arms deal with Russia for the purchase of 24 MiG-35 fighters. In February 2015, MiG Director General Sergei Korotkov announced that the company was ready to supply the MiG-35 jets to Egypt should the country request them. However, in April 2015, Egypt signed a $2 billion contract for the purchase of 46 MiG-29M/M2 multi-role fighters instead.

==== India ====
The MiG-35 was a contender with the Eurofighter Typhoon, Boeing F/A-18E/F Super Hornet, Dassault Rafale, Saab JAS 39 Gripen and General Dynamics F-16 Fighting Falcon in the Indian MRCA competition for 126 multirole combat aircraft to be procured by the Indian Air Force. During the competition however, India's Ministry of Defence was frustrated with the problems of the aircraft's avionics with the radar not able to achieve the maximum targeting distance during tests. Also, the RD-33MK engines were not shown to reach sufficient thrust. As a result, the MiG-35 was ousted from the contest in April 2011.

The aircraft is now competing with six other aircraft in a fresh tender, referred to as MMRCA 2.0 in the Indian media, for the procurement of 114 multi-role combat aircraft. In March 2020, Russia announced that they will offer an upgraded MiG-35 fighter jet equipped with an automatic landing and G-force protection systems as its entry for the Indian light fighter jet competition.

==== Argentina ====
In 2021, Russia offered Argentina MiG-35s equipped with Kh-35 anti-ship missile and Kh-38 air-to-surface missiles. In an interview with the website infodefensa.com Air Force chief Xavier Isaac called the Mig-35 one of candidates for the new fighter jet of the Argentine Air Force.

==== Bangladesh ====
On 2 March 2017, Bangladesh government floated a closed tender for eight fighters. The tender issued by Directorate General of Defence Purchase (DGDP) was controversial from the beginning as opposition Bangladesh Nationalist Party accused government Awami League of using Indian funding to buy obsolete aircraft from Russia. MiG-35 was one of the contenders, along with Sukhoi Su-30 fighter with European origin AESA radar. The Bangladesh government allocated almost $400 million for the procurement and Russia had negotiated with Bangladesh for a year for the sale of MiG-35. The Bangladesh government later terminated the tender due to funding shortage, and the acquisition of the Su-30 by the Myanmar Air Force (a regional rival) in 2018. Italian Elettronica SPA is also unable to work with any Russian company to fulfill Bangladesh's requirements due to international sanctions on Russia.

==== Malaysia ====
In 2019, there were reports that the Russian government had proposed providing two squadrons of MiG-35s to the Royal Malaysian Air Force, to replace its MiG-29N fleet. The RMAF had previously mothballed its MiG-29s due to high maintenance costs and downtime. As part of the deal, Malaysia would have returned 18 MiG-29Ns to Russia. This was the essence of an offer made by Russian president Vladimir Putin to Malaysia in August 2019.

In 2021 Rosoboronexport said Russia will send Mikoyan MiG-35 as the contender of RMAF's LCA program.

=== Potential operators ===
Peru and Myanmar were among other countries interested in acquiring MiG-35 fighters. The MiG-35 is also considered as a potential candidate to replace the retired MiG-21 and aging Su-22 fleets of the Vietnam People's Air Force.

== Variants ==
MiG-35S (Product 9.41SR)
Single-seat serial production variant. The variant has an extra fuel tank in the place of second pilot seat.
MiG-35UB (Product 9.47SR)
Two-seat serial production variant.
MiG-35 (Product 9.61)
Single-seat export variant, converted from MiG-29K or M for Indian demonstrations.
MiG-35D (Product 9.67)
Two-seat export variant, converted from MiG-29K or M for Indian demonstrations.

Naval version
According to the General Director of Mikoyan, Ilya Tarasenko, a carrier-based version of the MiG-35 is under development. Concern Radio-Electronic Technologies has already adapted a new landing system to the BINS-SP-2 deck for the MiG-35.

Export version
According to the General Director of UAC, Yuri Slyusar, they will create an export version of the MiG-35 fighter with a new cockpit. RAC MiG initially planned to fit in an AESA radar into the MiG-35. However, during series production, MiG has removed the Zhuk-A/AM AESA radar and TVC from the MiG-35 as the AESA is still under development. Export customers have to choose a Zhuk-M with a mechanically steered antenna.
Still, a 2024 Rosoboronexport commercial reaffirmed that the export MiG-35 would have AESA radar.

== Operators ==
Russia

- Russian Aerospace Forces

== Specifications (MiG-35) ==
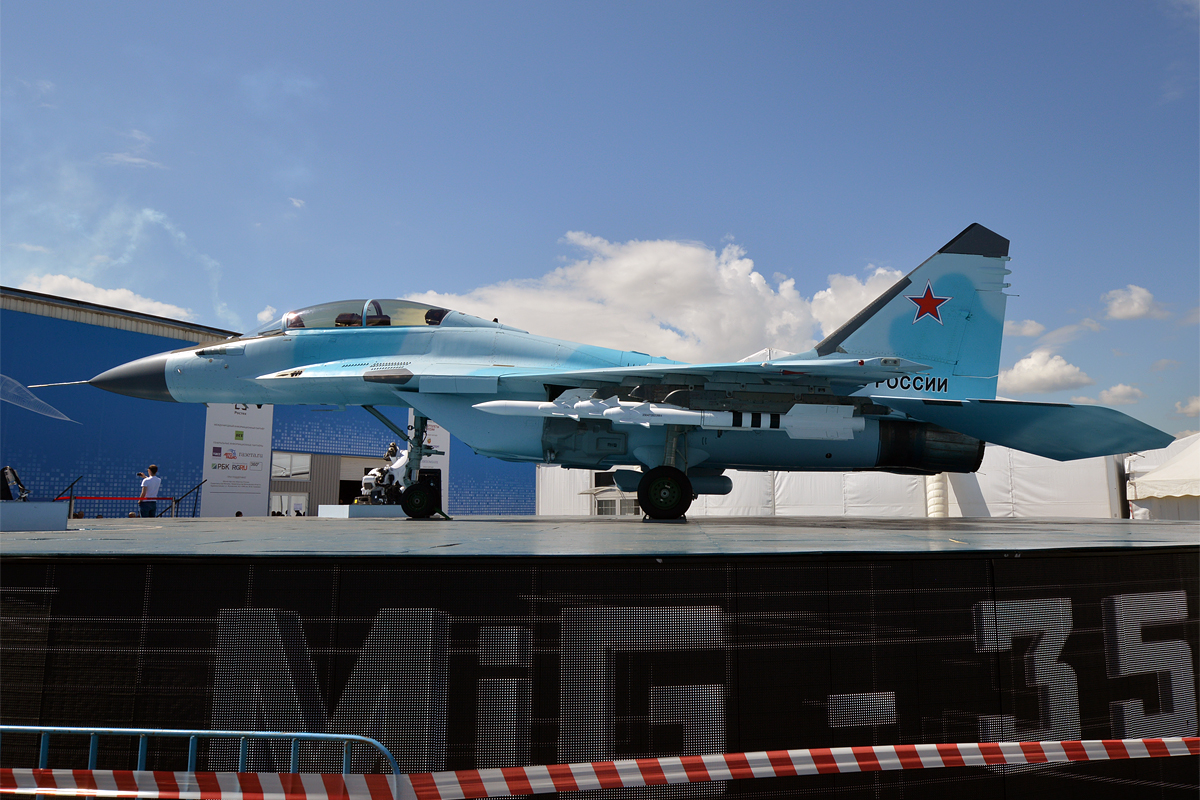
MiG-35UB pre-series at the MAKS 2017 International Aviation and Space Salon

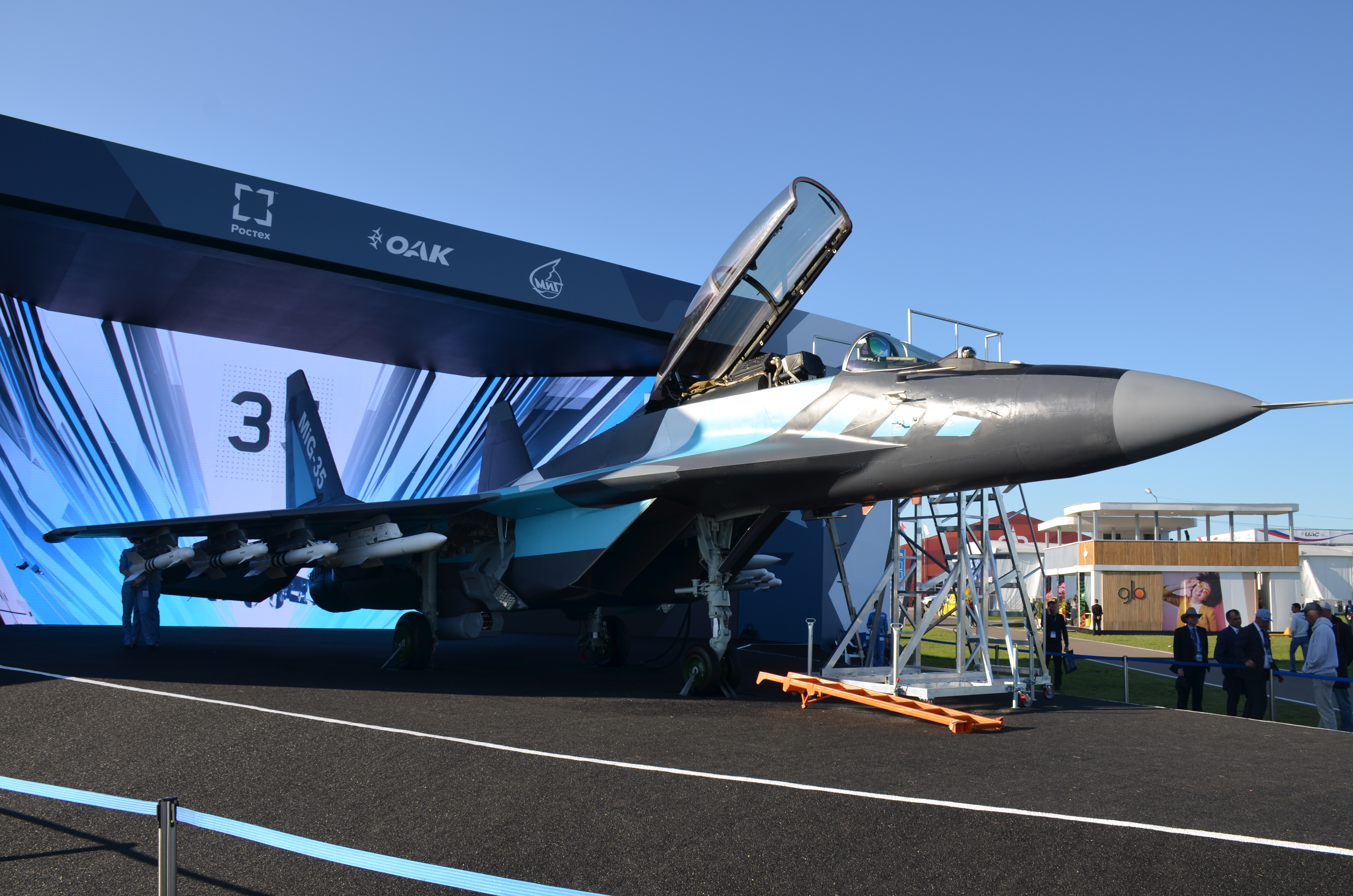
Export version of MiG-35 at the MAKS 2019 International Aviation and Space Salon

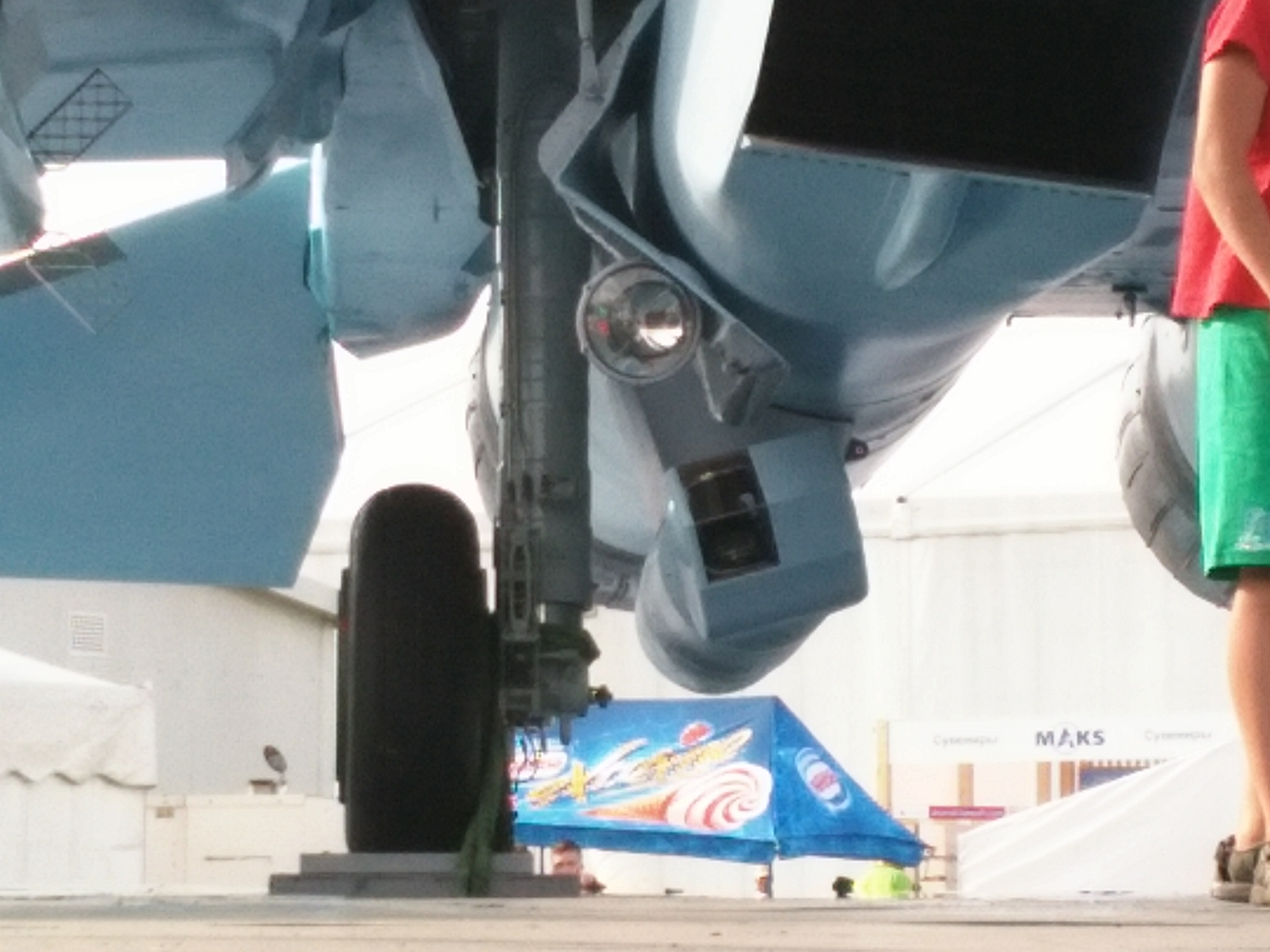
T220 targeting pod on a MiG-35 model

Data from Rosoboronexport MiG-35/35D, Mikoyan MiG-29M2 basic dimensions, deagel.com, airforce-technology.com

General characteristics

- Crew: 1 or 2
- Length: 17.3 m (56 ft 9 in)
- Wingspan: 12 m (39 ft 4 in)
- Height: 4.7 m (15 ft 5 in)
- Wing area: 41 m^{2} (440 sq ft)
- Empty weight: 11,000 kg (24,251 lb)
- Gross weight: 17,500 kg (38,581 lb)
- Max takeoff weight: 24,500 kg (54,013 lb)
- Max landing weight: 16,800 kg (37,000 lb)
- Powerplant: 2 × Klimov RD-33MK afterburning turbofan engines, 52 kN (12,000 lbf) thrust each dry, 88.2 kN (19,800 lbf) with afterburner

Performance

- Maximum speed: 2,100 km/h (1,300 mph, 1,100 kn) at altitude

1,400 km/h (870 mph; 756 kn; Mach 1.14) at sea level

- Maximum speed: Mach 2.25
- Cruise speed: 804.7 km/h (500.0 mph, 434.5 kn)
- Range: 2,100 km (1,300 mi, 1,100 nmi)
- Combat range: 1,000 km (620 mi, 540 nmi)
- Ferry range: 3,000 km (1,900 mi, 1,600 nmi) With 3 external fuel tanks

6,000 km (3,700 mi; 3,200 nmi) One in-flight refuelling and 3 external fuel tanks

- Service ceiling: 16,000 m (52,000 ft)
- g limits: +9 -3
- Rate of climb: 330 m/s (65,000 ft/min)

Armament

- Guns: 1 × 30 mm Gryazev-Shipunov GSh-30-1 autocannon with 100 rounds
- Hardpoints: 9 hardpoints with a capacity of up to 6,500 kg, with provisions to carry combinations of:
  - Rockets:
    - S-8
    - S-13
    - S-25L (LD) laser-guided variant
    - S-25-O with fragmentation warhead and radio proximity fuze
    - S-24
  - Missiles:
    - Air-to-air missiles:
      - R-73
      - R-77
    - Air-to-surface missiles:
      - Kh-25 MAE
      - Kh-29L/TE
      - Kh-38ME
      - Kh-38 Grom-E1
    - Anti-radiation missiles:
      - 4 × Kh-31PD
    - Anti-ship missiles:
      - 4 × Kh-31AD
  - Bombs:
    - KAB-500KR TV-guided bomb
    - KAB-500L laser-guided bomb
    - KAB-500S-E GLONASS guided bomb

Avionics

- Zhuk-M mechanically scanned radar (serial production) / Phazotron Zhuk-A/AM active electronically scanned array radar (optional for export)
- OLS-13SM-1 Infrared search and track (IRST)
- OLS-UEM electro-optical targeting system
- OLS-K electro-optical targeting system or T220 targeting pod
- MIL-STD-1553 Data bus

== See also ==
Related development

- Mikoyan MiG-29K
- Mikoyan MiG-29M

Aircraft of comparable role, configuration, and era

- Boeing F/A-18E/F Super Hornet
- Chengdu J-10C
- Dassault Rafale
- Eurofighter Typhoon
- Lockheed Martin F-16V Viper
- Mitsubishi F-2
- Saab JAS 39 Gripen
- Sukhoi Su-35

Related lists

- List of fighter aircraft
- List of military aircraft of the Soviet Union and the CIS
