= Pirometer Plant =

Pirometer Plant (Russian: Завод «Пирометр») is a company based in Saint Petersburg, Russia. It is part of the Concern Radio-Electronic Technologies holding (Rostec group).

The Pirometer Plant makes many types of electronic products with uses in a wide range of applications, including infrared electronics and electronic warning signaling equipment. It is part of the NPO Elektroavtomatika.
