= Klimov RD-33 =

Russian fighter aircraft engine

RD-33
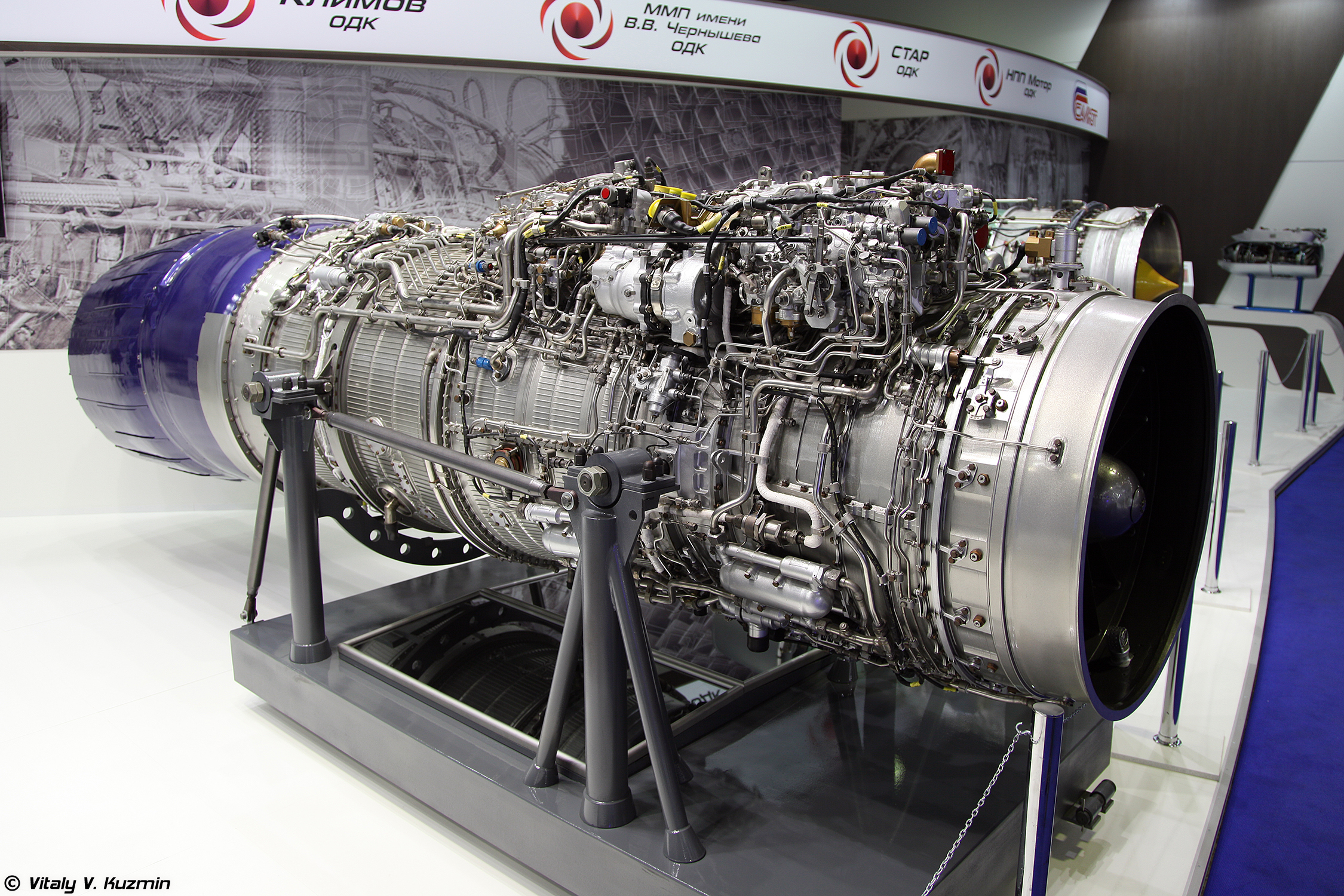
- RD-33MK as displayed during MAKS 2015
- Type: Turbofan
- National origin: Soviet Union
- Manufacturer: Klimov / Hindustan Aeronautics Limited
- First run: 1974
- Major applications: CAC/PAC JF-17 Thunder; Mikoyan MiG-29; Mikoyan MiG-29M/K; Mikoyan MiG-35; Shenyang FC-31

The Klimov RD-33 is a turbofan jet engine for a lightweight fighter jet and which is the primary engine for the Mikoyan MiG-29 and CAC/PAC JF-17 Thunder. It was developed in OKB-117 led by S. P. Izotov (now OAO Klimov) from 1968 with production starting in 1981. Previous generations of Russian supersonic fighters such as the MiG-21 and MiG-23 used turbojets, but western fighters such as the F-111 and F-4K introduced the use of afterburning turbofans in the 1960s which were more efficient.

The RD-33 was the first afterburning turbofan engine produced by the Klimov company of Russia in the 8,000 to 9,000 kilograms-force (78 to 88 kN; 18,000 to 20,000 lbf) thrust class. It features a modular twin-shaft design with individual parts that can be replaced separately.

== Variants ==
In early 1970s the RD-33 was selected for new light fighter jet, later becoming Mikoyan MiG-29, the other option was Tumansky R-67-300. Years of development has built an extensive engine family. A newly designed thrust vectoring nozzle (TVN) is now available. New models of the RD-33 family include BARK digital monitoring and control systems. Repair and maintenance of RD-33 engines takes advantage of an information and diagnostics system (IDS).

=== RD-33 ===
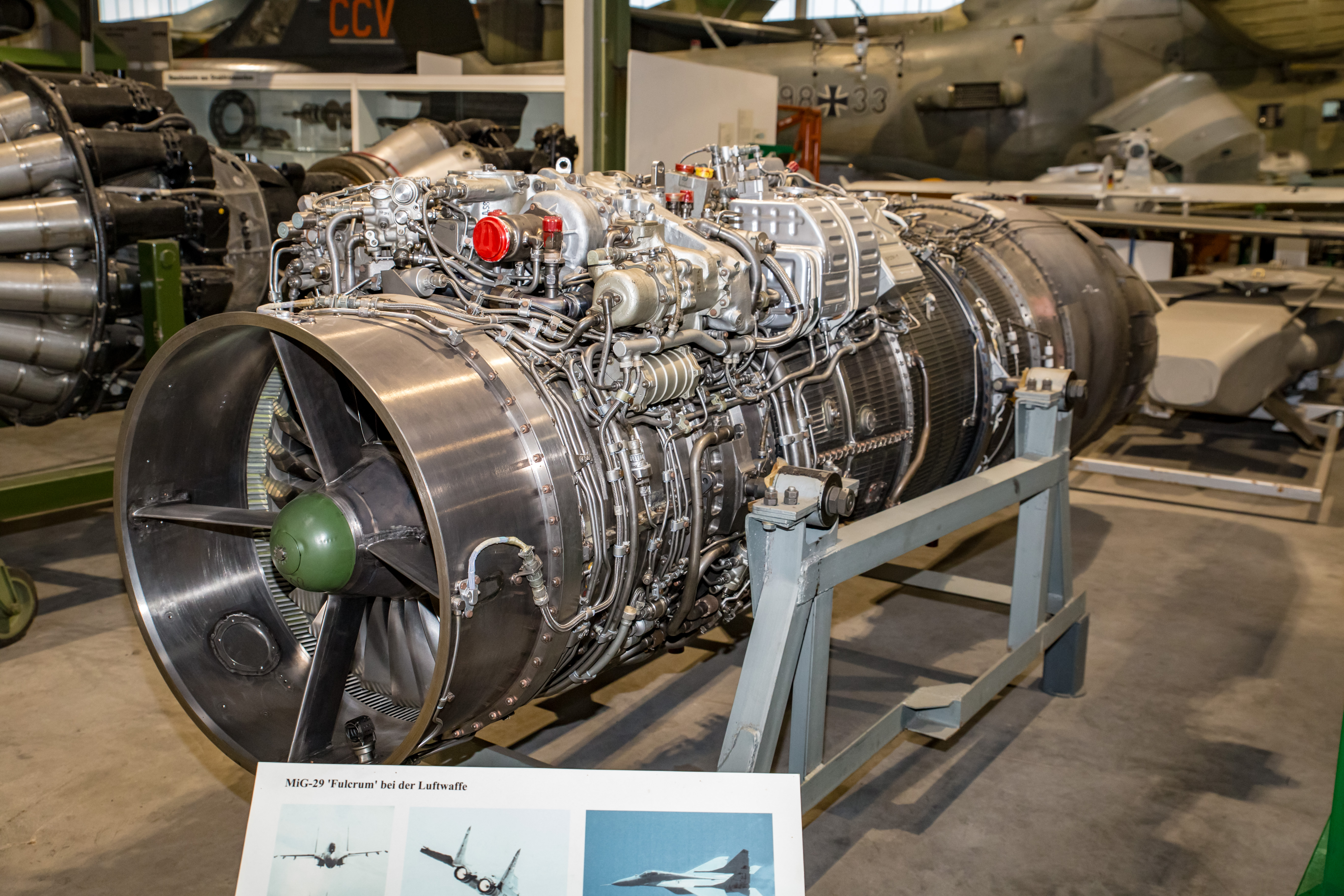
A legacy RD-33 engine being preserved in Germany.

Baseline model developed in 1976 to power the MiG-29. Development work started in 1968 at the Klimov Design Bureau, led by Sergey Isotov. The first few engines for the 9.01 MiG-29 prototype were equipped with a longer nozzle, without the double wall design, which is featured on the current RD-33 and RD-33MK models. This design had an extra controllable section after the critical cross section in the Laval type nozzle. The reason was the control of the jet blast contour at high altitude, low ambient air pressure, where the exhaust gases over expanding after the exhaust section. Right after the first few example and the first few MiG-29 prototype models, this difficult control system was removed, due to the operational altitude limit of the upcoming fighter. The first few series of the basic RD-33 version had some issue with the oil system, where a leakage caused a series of problems for the test pilots, because the oil leakage generated toxic particles in the air conditioning system. After the production line was going, these kinds of teething problems were solved. The only disadvantage was a low service life, and heavy smoke, which was fixed only in the later models.

=== RD-33B/NB ===
A model without afterburner for various types of aircraft, such as the Il-102.

=== RD-93/93MA ===
A variant used to power the JF-17 Thunder (FC-1), having "the most significant difference being the repositioning of the gearbox along the bottom of the engine casing." The Klimov poster at Zhuhai 2010 airshow gave the thrust range of the engine to be 49.4 kN to 84.4 kN wet. This was designed specifically for FC-1 with increased thrust and relocated gearbox compared to base RD-33's, although the increase of thrust decreased the service life of RD-93 to 2200 hours from RD-33's 4000 hours. According to Air Commodore Mehmood engines are solid and reliable: “We’ve flown 7,000 hours with the engine and we haven’t had any problems”, he said. The RD-93MA is an upgrade of the RD-93 engine. The thrust of the RD-93MA is expected to 9300 kgf (91,2 kN) compared to 8300 kgf of the RD-93, a significant bump-up in power which will help the jet to carry more armaments and fly at a higher speed. This has been specifically developed to power JF-17 Block III fighter jets.

RD-5000B

A non-afterburning variant used to power the MiG Skat UCAV, 50.4 kN (11,340 lbf) dry thrust.

=== SMR-95 ===
SMR-95

A model for upgrading international 2nd and 3rd generation jet fighters. The accessory gearbox is repositioned below the engine, length can be varied depending on the adopted aircraft fuselage. The engine passed bench tests and flight tests on the Super Mirage F-1 and Super Cheetah D-2 aircraft of the South African Air Force and had achieved an improvement in flight performance and combat efficiency by a factor ranging from 1.2 to 3.0.

=== RD-33 series 3 ===
A revised model with a longer service life used on later or upgraded old variants of the MiG-29 such as MiG-29M and MiG-29SMT. A pair of RD-33 series 3 engines equipped with thrust-vectoring nozzles was used to power the MiG-29OVT jet fighter.

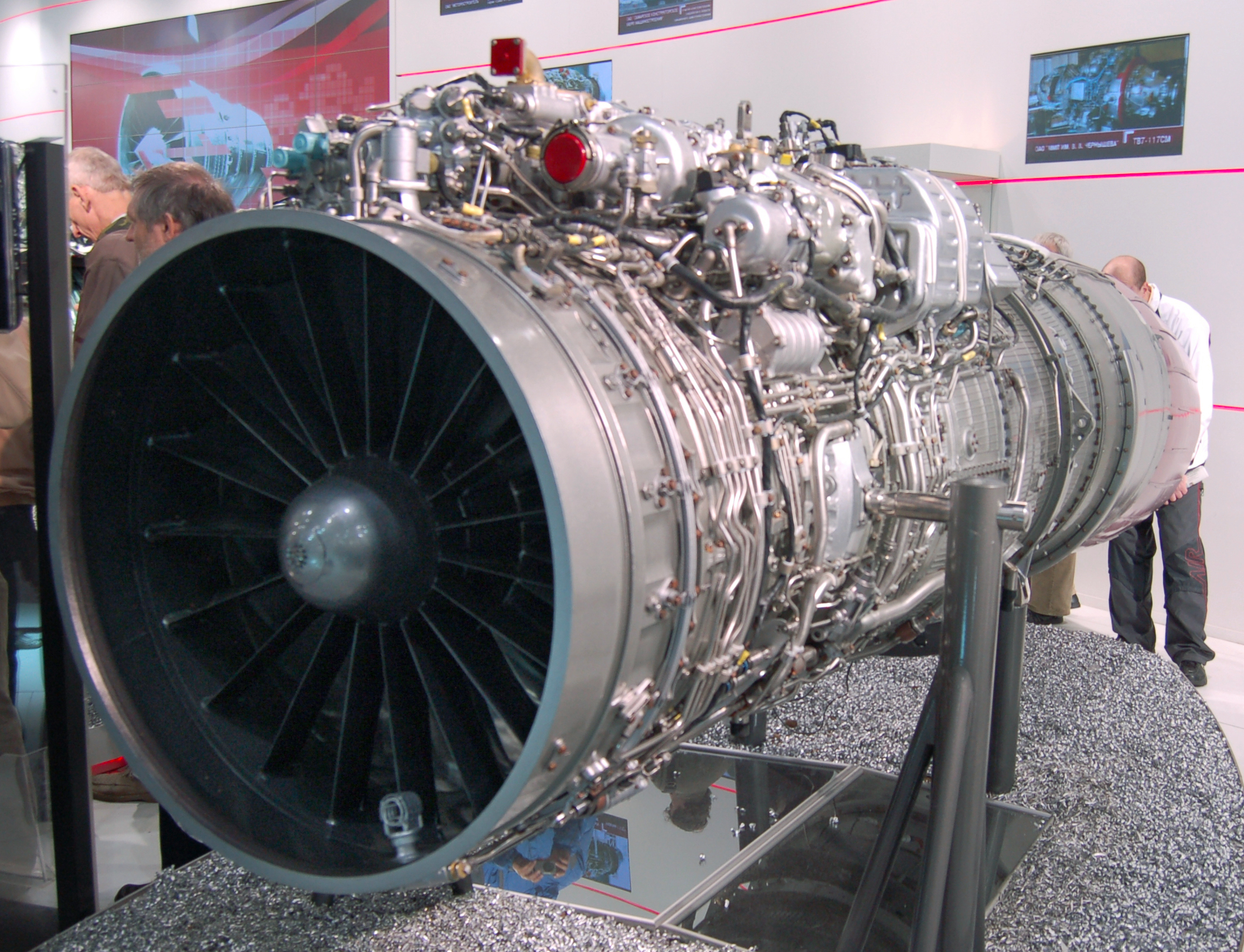
RD-33MK in MAKS 2009.

=== RD-33MK ===
The RD-33MK "Morskaya Osa" (Russian: Морская Оса: "Sea Wasp") is the latest model developed in 2001. It is intended to power the MiG-29K and MiG-29KUB shipborne fighters, however it has also been adopted for the MiG-35. The RD-33MK develops 7% higher thrust, is digitally controlled FADEC and smokeless unlike earlier RD-33 engines, has increased afterburner thrust to 9,000 kilograms-force (88,000 N; 20,000 lbf) and dry weight 1,145 kilograms (2,524 lb) compared to the baseline model through modern materials used on the cooled blades, although it retains the same length and maximum diameter. Infrared and optical signature visibility reduction systems have been added. Service life has been increased to 4,000 hours. The RD-33MK ensures unassisted take-off capability for ship-borne fighters, retains its performance in hot climates, and thereby provides a boost in combat efficiency for the latest variant of the MiG-29 fighter.

India's Hindustan Aeronautics Limited has obtained licensed production for RD-33MK variant in 2007 and so far has produced 140 engines till 2020.

== Applications ==
RD-33

- Ilyushin Il-102
- Mikoyan MiG-29
- Mikoyan MiG-33
- Mikoyan MiG-35

RD-93

- CAC/PAC JF-17 Thunder
- Shenyang FC-31 (initial prototype)

SMR-95

- Dassault Mirage F1 (non-production)

== Specifications (RD-33) ==
Data from Janes Aero Engines, Klimov Website, Leteckemotory

==== General characteristics ====
- Type: afterburning turbofan
- Length: 4,229 mm (166.50 in)
- Diameter: 730 mm (28.74) inlet, 1,040 mm (40.94 in) maximum
- Dry weight: 1,055 kg (2,326 lb)

==== Components ====
- Compressor: 2 spool axial, 4 low pressure stages, 9 high pressure stages
- Combustors: annular combustor
- Turbine: single stage high pressure, single stage low pressure

==== Performance ====
- Maximum thrust: 50.0 kN (11,230 lbf) dry, 81.3 kN (18,285 lbf) afterburning.
- Overall pressure ratio: 21:1
- Bypass ratio: 0.49
- Air mass flow: 75.5 kg/s (166.5 lbm/s)
- Turbine inlet temperature: 1,407 °C (1,680 K; 2,565 °F)
- Specific fuel consumption: 75 kg/(kN·h) (0.77 lb/(lbf·h)) dry, 188.1 kg/(kN·h) (1.85 lb/(lbf·h))
- Thrust-to-weight ratio: 4.82 (dry), 7.9 (afterburning)
- Life expectancy: 4,000 hours

== See also ==
Comparable engines

- General Electric F404
- Snecma M88
- Turbo-Union RB199
- Guizhou WS-13

Related lists

- List of aircraft engines
