= Concern Radio-Electronic Technologies =

Russian defence company

- Company type: Joint-stock company
- Industry: defense industry, electronics industry
- Headquarters: Moscow, Russia
- Products: Electronics, radios, communication equipment, electronic countermeasures, medical equipment
- Revenue: $1.85 billion (2016; 2018)
- Operating income: $262 million (2016)
- Net income: $205 million (2016)
- Number of employees: 42,755 (2016)
- Parent: Rostec
- Website: ktrv.ru

Concern Radio-Electronic Technologies (CRET) (Russian: Концерн Радиоэлектронные технологии, КРЭТ (KRET)) is a holding company within the Russian state-owned Rostec group that develops and manufactures military specialized radio-electronic, state identification, aviation and radio-electronic equipment, multi-purpose measuring devices, detachable electrical connectors and a variety of civil products.

The Corporate Group has developed one of the two existing state radiolocation identification systems.

== Structure ==
Companies of the holding:

- Research and Production Company RITM
- JSC Automatics
- Bryansk Electromechanical Plant
- Vladykinsky Mechanical Plant
- All-Russian Scientific Research Institute Gradient
- State Ryazan Instrument Plant
- Zhigulevsky Radio Plant
- Engineering support of tests Takeoff
- Kazan Instrument-Making Design Bureau
- Kaluga Plant of Radio Engineering Equipment
- Kaluga Research Radio Engineering Institute
- Design Bureau of the plant Russia
- Design Bureau for Radio Monitoring, Navigation and Communication
- Concern Avionika
- Aerospace Equipment Corporation
- Phazotron
- Kursk Plant Mayak
- MKB Compass
- Moscow Institute of Electromechanics and Automation
- Moscow Radio Plant TEMP
- Scientific Research Institute Ekran
- Research Institute of Aviation Equipment
- Research Institute for the Development of Connectors and Specialty Electronics Products
- Scientific-Production Association Kvant
- Scientific Production Association Radioelectronics Shimko
- Scientific-Production Enterprise Izmeritel
- Scientific-Production Enterprise ElTom
- Nizhny Novgorod Research and Production Association named after MV Frunze
- Experimental Design Bureau Electroautomatics named after PA Efimov
- Radium
- Radiopribor
- Ramensky Instrument Making Plant
- Rostov Plant Pribor
- Special Design Bureau of Radio Measuring Equipment
- Taganrog Scientific Research Institute of Communications
- Ulyanovsk Instrument Making Design Bureau
- Ural Instrument Making Plant
- Ufimskoe Instrument-Making Production Association
- FNPTS NNIPI Quartz
- Fazotron-VMZ
- Almetyevsky Plant Radiopribor
- Aeropribor-Voskhod
- Kazan Scientific and Research Technological Institute of Computer Engineering
- Design Bureau of Industrial Automation
- OJSC Microtechnology
- Research Institute of Special Information and Measuring Systems
- Scientific - Production center SAPSAN
- Scientific and technical center of the system and means of state recognition
- JSC Lever
- Bryansk special design bureau
- Stavropol Radio Plant Signal
- Tambov Plant Elektropribor
- Techpribor

== History ==
On July 16, 2014, the Obama administration imposed sanctions through the US Department of Treasury's Office of Foreign Assets Control (OFAC) by adding Concern Radio-Electronic Technologies and other entities to the Specially Designated Nationals List (SDN) in retaliation for the ongoing Russo-Ukrainian War, annexation of the Crimean Peninsula by the Kremlin, and the Russian interference in Ukraine. Despite that, in 2020 KRET participated in a Russian medical aid delivery during the coronavirus pandemic in New York. Delivering its medical equipment like very need ventilators to the US, with reports claiming that the Russian aid was partly paid by the US and the RDIF. Officials from the US administration replied that sanctions aren't applied for medical supply.

== Communications Equipment for Russian Forces ==
United Instrument Manufacturing Corporation of KRET/Rostec is producing fifth-generation Rostec R-168-5UN-2 Military-Transceiver. The VHF band radio with GPS data transmit ability and a digital crypto system and an output power of 8 Watt.

== Sanctions ==
On June 18, 2021, Ukraine added the concern to the sanctions list.

On December 16, 2022, Concern Radio-Electronic Technologies was added to the EU sanctions lists as a developer and manufacturer of military-grade electronic products, bearing responsibility for material or financial support for actions that undermined or threatened the territorial integrity, sovereignty and independence of Ukraine.

The concern is also on the sanctions list of New Zealand.
