= S-25 (rocket) =

Soviet air-to-ground rocket

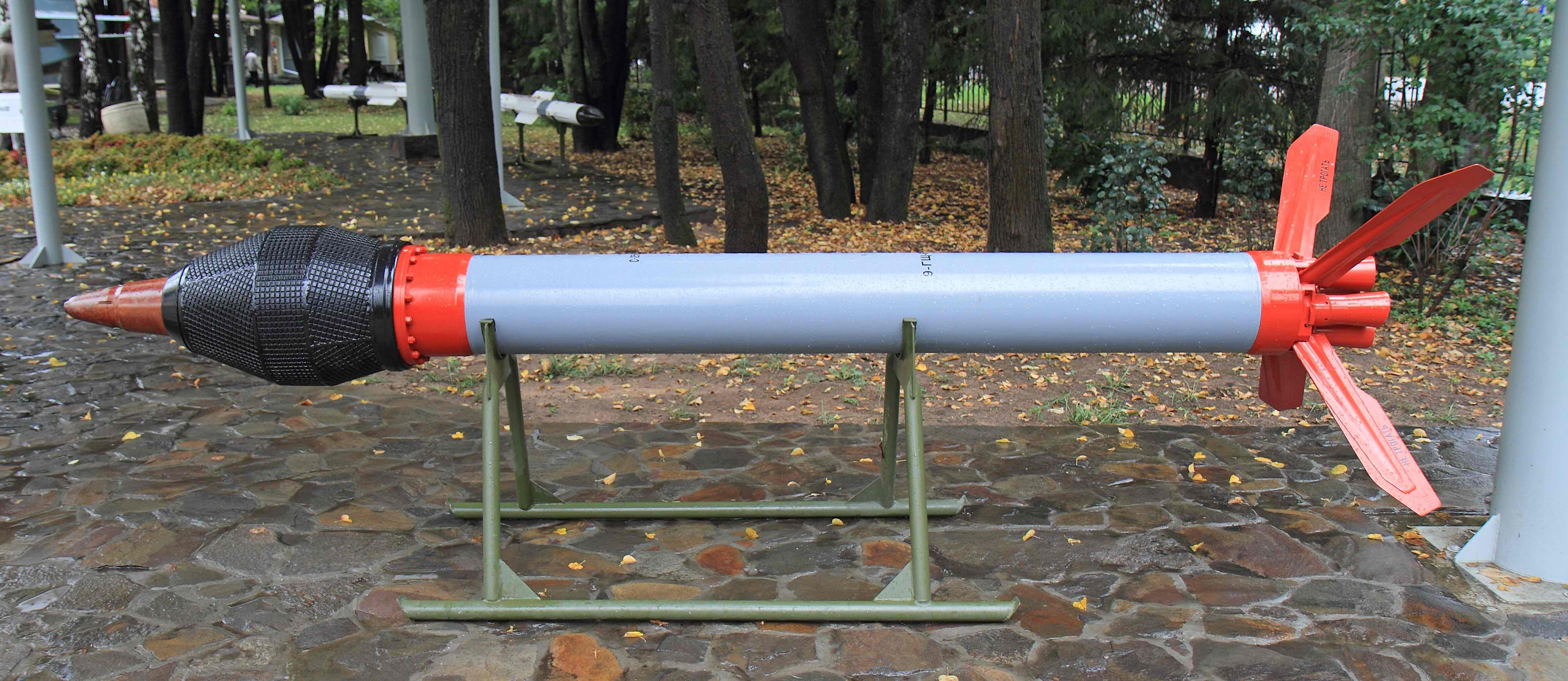
- An S-25 rocket on display.
- Type: Rocket
- Place of origin: Soviet Union

Service history
- Used by: Russian Aerospace Forces; Ukrainian Air Force
- Wars: Russo-Ukrainian War

Production history
- Variants: S-25-OF (high explosive-fragmentation warhead); S-25-O (fragmentation warhead and radio proximity fuze); S-25-OFM (hardened targets); S-25L (laser-guided)

Specifications
- Mass: 820 lb (370 kg)
- Length: 140 in (3.56 m)
- Diameter: 13 in (340 mm)
- Maximum speed: 700 m/s
- Guidance system: unguided / laser-guided (S-25L)
- Launch platform: Su-25, Su-25T, Su-25TM, Su-27, Su-34, Su-35

The S-25 is a Soviet air-to-ground rocket launched from aircraft. It is launched from the O-25 pod which can hold one rocket. The rocket first entered service with the Soviet Air Force in 1975.

== Variants ==
The rocket has four variants:

- S-25-OF with high explosive-fragmentation warhead
- S-25-O with fragmentation warhead and radio proximity fuze
- S-25-OFM for use against hardened targets
- S-25L (LD) laser-guided variant
