= Phazotron-NIIR =

Russia's largest developer of military radars and avionics

JSC Phazotron-NIIR
- Formerly: OKB-339
- Company type: Joint stock company
- Industry: Defense industry Aerospace industry
- Founded: 1917
- Headquarters: Moscow, Russia
- Products: Electronics, avionics, radars
- Parent: Concern Radio-Electronic Technologies (Rostec)
- Website: phazotron.com

Phazotron-NIIR (Phazotron-NIIR, Russian: ОАО «Корпорация «Фазотрон-НИИР») is Russia's largest developer of military radars and avionics. Named after one of its major projects, the first cosmotron in the former-USSR, it was formed in June 1917 to produce aviation instruments. Its main office is located in Moscow and it has 25 affiliated companies, branches and separate units in Moscow and other cities in Russia and Belarus. It employs an estimated 5000 employees. During the Soviet era, it was commonly known as the Scientific Research Institute of Radar, NII Radar or NIIR (not to be confused with NII Radio, also NIIR).

One of its former chief designers was Adolf Tolkachev, who became an American spy and over the years between 1979 and 1985, supplied a great deal of information about such projects R-23, R-24, R-33, R-27, and R-60, S-300, as well as about fighter-interceptor aircraft radars used on MiG-29, MiG-31, and Su-27 and other avionics directly to the CIA.

The main competitor of Phazotron in the former Soviet Union and Russia is the Tikhomirov Scientific Research Institute of Instrument Design, or NIIP, and both design houses were briefly joined but then separated again.

== Products ==
Phazotron builds radars and radar weapon and defense control systems for aircraft, gun-missile ground-based and ship-borne air defense systems. Phazotron also builds radars for space vehicles. In addition to its military products, Phazotron also develops weather radars and civil products.

=== Radars ===
- N010 Zhuk Airborne Radar
- N007 Zaslon Airborne Radar

== See also ==
- Vega Radio Engineering Corporation
- Aviadvigatel
