= Zhuk (radar) =

Family of aircraft radar systems

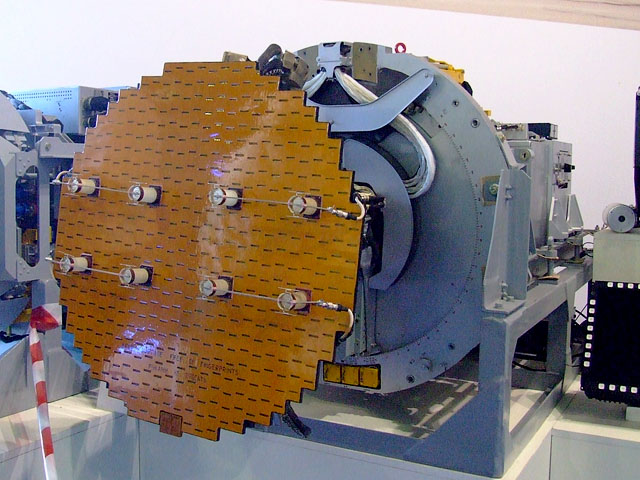
- Zhuk-ME Antenna at MAKS 2007
- Country of origin: Russia
- Type: Slotted Planar/PESA/AESA
- Frequency: X-band
- Range: 90 to 260 km, depending on variant

The N010 Zhuk are a family of Russian (former USSR) all-weather multimode airborne radars developed by NIIR Phazotron for multi-role combat aircraft such as the MiG-29. The PESA versions were also known as Sokol.

== Description ==
The Zhuk (Beetle) family of X band pulse-Doppler radars provide aircraft with two modes of operation, air-to-air and air-to-surface. The air-to-air mode of the Zhuk is capable of detecting targets and measuring their coordinates, range and speed. The radar has a look-down/shoot-down capability for air targets against a cluttered or water background and a variety of search modes are available. Individual targets can be tracked or multiple targets can be tracked and engaged at once while searching for new targets in track while scan mode. The Zhuk radar can identify detected targets by class and prioritise multiple targets for engagement. A variety of close combat scanning modes are featured including vertical scan, HUD view, boresight and slewable are available as well as locking onto a visually acquired target. The Zhuk radar also offers the ability to track and engage helicopters even when they are hovering. The Zhuk is compatible with a variety of air-to-air weapons including the radar guided R-77 and R-27 missiles to which it can provide targeting, target brightening and radio adjustment. The radar is compatible with optically guided missiles like the R-73 and can also provide fire control for aircraft cannon.

In the air-to-surface mode the N010 radar offers a mapping capability using either Synthetic aperture radar (SAR), real beam or doppler beam narrowing modes with a resolution of up to 3x3m with zooming and image freezing functions. The radar can detect and track with measurement of range and speed both moving and static ground and naval targets. The Zhuk radar can support low altitude terrain following flying and can also detect dangerous weather patterns during flight. The radar is compatible with a variety of air-to-surface weaponry, including Kh-29 air-to-surface missiles as well as Kh-31 anti-radiation missiles.

== Variants ==
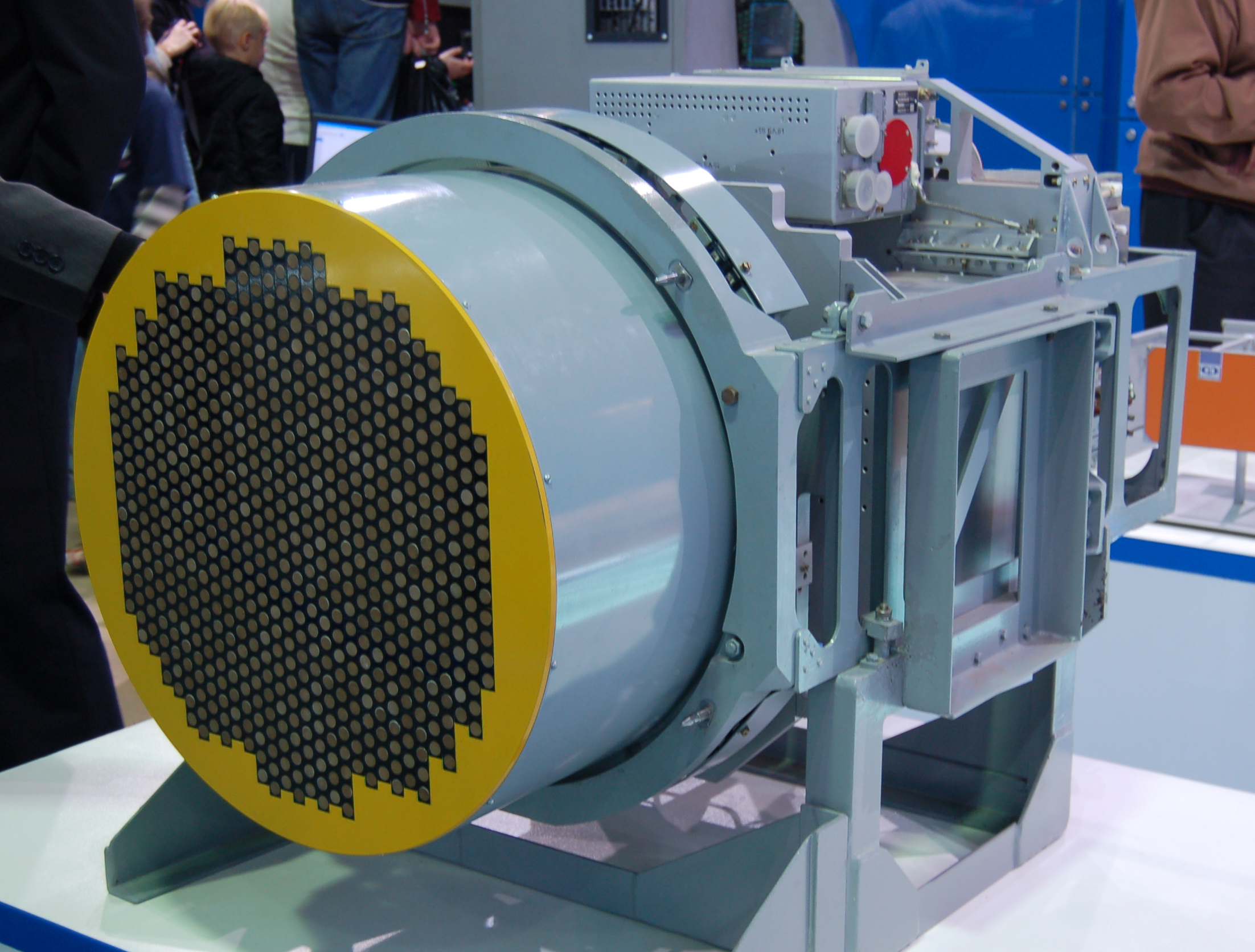
Picture of the original FGA-29

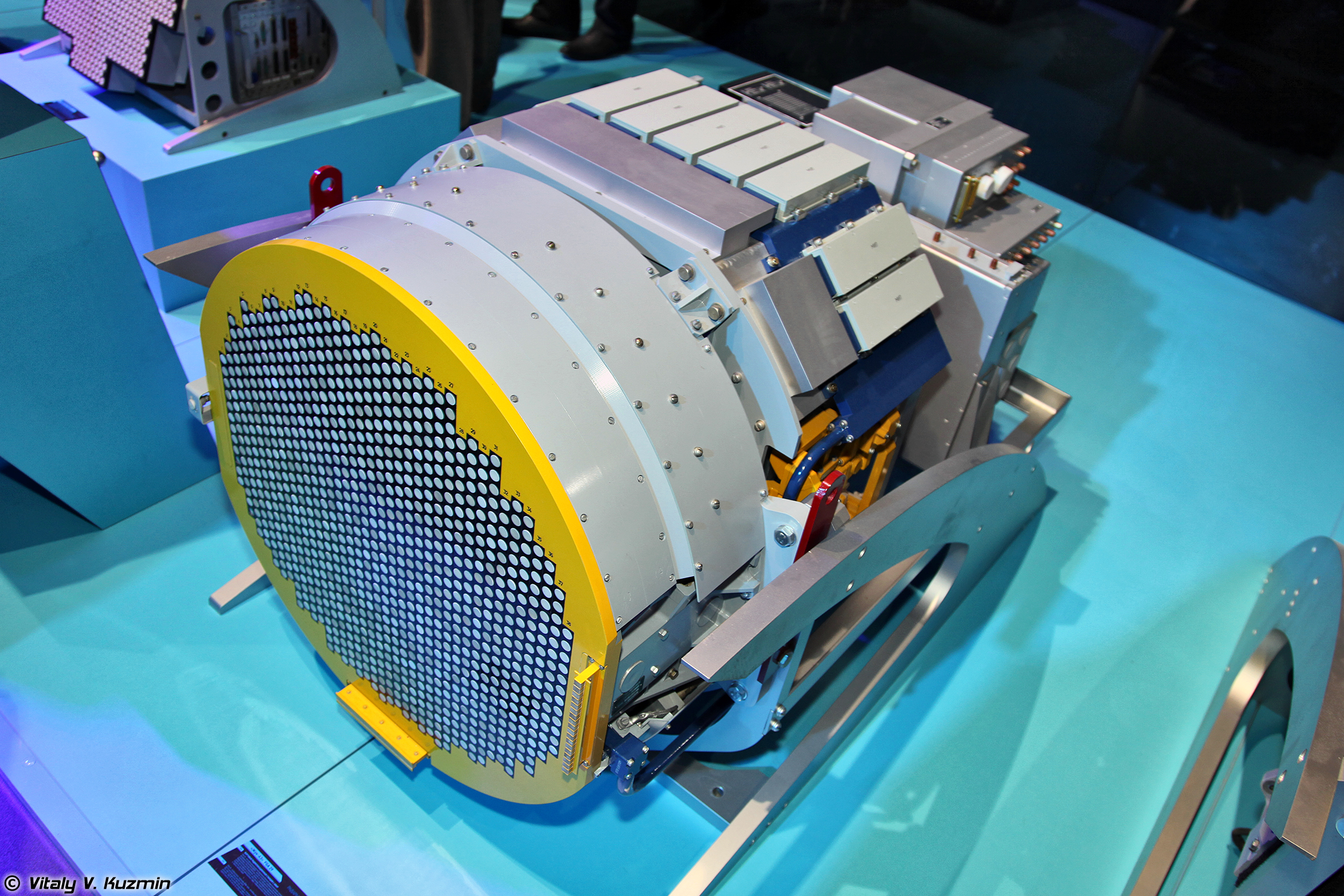
Picture of FGA-35 (Now labeled as FGA-29)

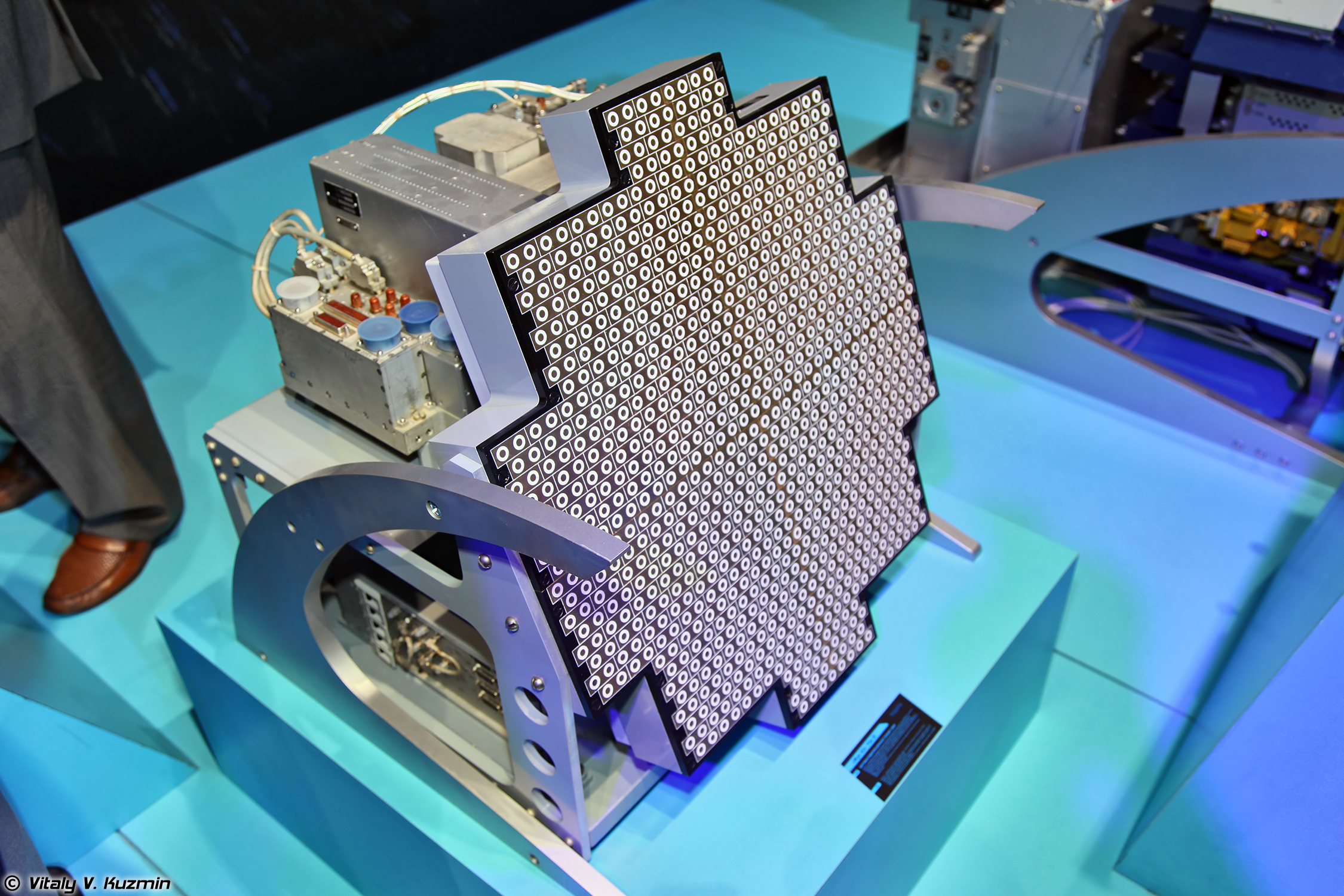
Picture of FGA-35(3D) shown at MAKS 2013 (was relabeled as FGA-35)

=== Zhuk ===
The Zhuk (N010) radar was first tested in 1987 for installation on the MiG-29M fighter upgrade and was also proposed as a radar upgrade for the MiG-23 fighter. The original Zhuk radar was only capable of air-to-air combat and never made it into service with the Russian armed forces due to the cancellation of the MiG-29M upgrade program. The Zhuk has a weight of 250 kg and uses a 680 mm electronically scanned slotted planar array antenna which offers a detection range of 90 km against a target with a 5 m^{2} radar cross-section (RCS). The radar can track 10–12 targets while engaging 2–4 of them with a scanning area of +/- 90 degrees in azimuth and +55/-40 degrees in elevation; its power output was rated at 5 kW peak.

=== Zhuk-8II ===
An export variant of the Zhuk radar developed for the Shenyang F-8-II Finback-B with similar performance to the Zhuk radar, only with a slightly reduced weight of 240 kg. Scan sector is +85° in azimuth and +55/-40° in elevation, with a range of 90 km against bombers and 70 km against fighters. The radar can simultaneously detect 10 targets, track 2 of the 10 detected and engage 1 of the 2 tracked.

=== Zhemchoug ===
Zhemchoug (Pearl) of Zhuk series radar is a radar developed for Chengdu J-10 and FC-1 project with planar slotted array antenna. Weight is reduced by approximately a third to 180 kg, and the search and tracking range is 80 km and 60 km respectively. Zhemchoug can simultaneously detect 20 targets and track 4 of 20 detected, and engage the 4 tracked. However, China did not choose this radar for their J-10 fighter.

=== Zhuk-10PD ===
Zhuk-10PD is a further upgrade of earlier Zhemchoug also intended for Chinese J-10, with search range increased to 160 km (85 nm), and the targets that can be simultaneously tracked increased to 6. However, once again Chinese didn't choose this radar due to the successful development of their active phased array airborne radar (AESA) radar.

=== Zhuk-27 ===
Designed for the Su-27 but with similar tracking and scanning performance to the Zhuk radar, the Zhuk-27 weighed slightly more than the Zhuk at 275 kg but had a superior detection range of 130 km vs a 5 m^{2} RCS target.

=== Zhuk-M (Export Designation Zhuk-ME) ===
The N010M Zhuk-M is a further development of Zhuk radar. The radar forms part of the MiG-29 and its variations. The Zhuk-ME finding success on export MiG-29K aircraft to India. The radar features improved signal processing and has a detection range of up to 120 km vs a 5 m^{2} RCS target for the export variant, and up to 10 targets tracked and up to 4 attacked at once in air-to-air mode. In air-to-surface mode the radar can detect a tank from up to 25 km away and a bridge from 120 km away, a naval destroyer could be detected up to 300 km away and up to two surface targets can be tracked at once. The radar has a weight of 220 kg and a scanning area of +/- 85 degrees in azimuth and +56/-40 degrees in elevation. The antenna is a mechanically scanned slotted planar array and has a diameter of 624 mm. The Indian Navy has reportedly had multiple Radar failures with the Zhuk-ME radar used on both the MiG-29K/KUB with its serviceability dropping to around 60-hours before becoming defective. This was also confirmed by leaked documents released by Black Mirror Hackers, a Ukrainian hacking group.

=== Zhuk-MS (Export Designation Zhuk-MSE) ===
Zhuk-M radar developed for the Su-27 and its derivatives, the export Zhuk-MSE is suggested as being exported to China for use in PLAAF Su-30MKK aircraft. The antenna is an electronically scanned slotted planar array and has a diameter of 980 mm with a peak output of 6 kW. The Zhuk-MSE offers detection performance up to 150 km vs a 5 m^{2} RCS target with up to 10 targets tracked and up to 4 attacked at once in air-to-air mode. The radar has a weight of 275 kg

=== Zhuk-F/Zhuk-PH ===
An original Zhuk radar started in the late 80s featuring a passive electronically scanned array (PESA) antenna instead of a slotted planar array. The radar never made it into service or out of development despite being offered for export. Designed for the Su-27 the Zhuk-F had predicted 165 km ~ 140 km detection range against a 3 sq m RCS. Capability to detect 24 targets and track up to 8 with ability to engage 2 of them. Some sources note 24 targets could be tracked at once, and ability to engage 6 to 8. (It is possible that during development the target tracked and engagement capability had been increased.) The size of the PESA antenna was 980 mm. The radar had a weight of 275–300 kg and a scanning area of +/- 70 degrees in elevation and azimuth.

=== RP-35 ===
Is a development of Phazotron's first PESA radar Zhuk-F for original MIG-35. The RP-35 adopts the traditional linear radar field distribution typical among most PESA radars. The radar can simultaneously track 24 targets with a range against a 3 m^{2} RCS target 140 km head on, 65 km pursuit. The radar has an 800mm sized antenna, with volume of 500 dm^{3}, and weighs 220 kg. RP-35 and similar PESA radars with traditional linear radar field distribution is no longer actively developed by Phazotron, which is concentrating on non-equidistant design, which Phazotron claims, offers a fivefold radar cost reduction.

=== Zhuk-MF (Export Designation Zhuk-MFE) formerly part of the Sokol PESA development ===
N031 Sokol series were originally separate radar family from Zhuk family. But was later relabeled under "Zhuk" label. Sokol/Zhuk-MF use Phazotron's unique radial distribution arrangement in the backplane waveguide feed, and proprietary radiating element placement. Featuring a 700 mm antenna. The Zhuk-MFE offered initial detection performance of up to 120 km. With capability of tracking up to 20 targets and engaging up to 4 engaged of those at once. Zhuk-MF like the former Sokol is designed for high reliability, and is frequency agile with LPI and anti-ECM features. The radar has a weight of 285 kg. Further work on Sokol/Zhuk-MF was stopped.

=== Zhuk-MSF (Export Designation Zhuk-MSFE) former N031 Sokol series ===
N031 Sokol series were originally separate radar family from Zhuk family. But were relabeled under "Zhuk" label. Offered for Sukhoi family and also as an alternative radar for the MiG-31 interceptor as opposed to the standard N007 Zaslon radar. Sokol/Zhuk-MFSE use Phazotron's unique radial distribution arrangement in the backplane waveguide feed, and proprietary radiating element placement. The Zhuk-MFSE offers detection performance up to 180 km vs a 5 m^{2} RCS target with up to 30 targets tracked and up to 6 attacked at once in air-to-air mode. The radar has a weight of 305 kg. The radar uses a PESA antenna, which has a diameter of 980 mm with a peak power output of 8 kW with 16 carrier frequencies. Sokol/Zhuk-MF is also frequency agile with LPI and anti-ECM features.

=== Zhuk-MA/MAE ===
The first incarnation of the Zhuk radar family featuring an Active electronically scanned array (AESA) based on N031 Sokol series was introduced in 2005 at MAKS. The Zhuk MA (MAE for export) used 1088 transceiver modules divide into 272 blocks and an antenna of 700 mm diameter. With a range of 200 km and ability to track 30 targets and engage 8 out of those. Was aimed for Su-27's and MiG-29's. However, the large size and weight (about 400~500 kg) it was deemed too heavy. (Official placard from 2005 MAKS contradicts this and puts the weight at 285 kg.) It could be that Zhuk-MA was confused with the first Phazotron-NIIR AESA of which only the antenna was shown at MAKS 2001. (Internally also known as FGA01)

=== Zhuk-A/AE ===
The second incarnation of the Zhuk radar family shown at MAKS 2007 featuring an Active electronically scanned array were the Zhuk-A (AE for export). Two variants of the Zhuk-A's exist: the FGA-29, and the bigger FGA-35.

The FGA-29 features a 575 mm antenna and 680 T/R modules. Was stated for initial stage performance to have a detection range of 120 km (Later advertised as 130 km) for 3 m^{2} targets and able to track 30 targets and engaged 6 of those at any one time. Later the performance was raised to 148 km for detection and tracking and was expected to reach a detection range up to 250 km and had a weight of 220 kg (later advertised 200 kg) Work on FGA-29 was stopped. and the FGA-29 label was given to 1016 T/R modules FGA-35 radar.

The FGA-35 featured 688mm antenna and 1016 T/R modules (originally planned 1064) with initial stage performance of a 200 km detection range for 3 m^{2} RCS target. Later detection range was raised up to 250 km. Able to track 30 targets and engage 6 of those at any one time. (Later reports mentioned capability of detecting 60 targets and tracking 30 with ability to engage 8 of those. Some western and Russian sources erroneously reporting 60 targets tracked instead of detected. ) The FGA-35 was later relabeled as FGA-29.

=== FGA-35(3D) ===
The FGA-35(3D) was first shown at MAKS in 2013. It is a GaN-based AESA, scalable, meant for various platforms with the version shown at MAKS having a 688mm(?) antenna and 960 T/R's. In an interview the new radar was mentioned to be weighing about 130 kg (for fighter planes) and having a 200 km range for a 5-ton UAV version. FGA-35(3D) was relabeled as FGA-35 while the original FGA-35 was relabeled as FGA-29.

=== Zhuk-AM/AME ===
In 2016 aerospace exhibition, held in Zhunhai Phazotron unveiled a new AESA radar named Zhuk-AM/AME which is likely further evolution of FGA-35 and renamed as Zhuk-AM/AME. According to Janes, the Zhuk-AME (or FGA-50) can track up to 30 targets and can simultaneously attack up to six aerial targets and has detection range up to 260 km, which is an improvement of 50% compared with previously developed variants of the Zhuk radar. The source added that the new radar weighs about 100 kg.

During 2015 Aero India Phazotron showcased a placard of Zhuk FGA-35, the radar in the placard looking like Zhuk-AM/AME instead of the FGA-35 (which was besides the placard). and was also marketed for HAL LCA.

During MAKS 2019 international air show Phazotron unveiled the latest offered AESA radar for Mig-35. The radar has 1,000 solid-state transceiver-receiver module. Export customers can choose this radar instead of PESA radar of serial production MiG-35.

=== Zhuk-AU/AUE ===
On-board radar system with active phased array antenna, made with the same technology as Zhuk-AM, standardized for installation on different types of aircraft including drones. Can also be installed/carried in pods.

Zhuk-AU/AUE comes in following versions:

- FGA 51.1 - A forward-looking "X" band AESA radar
- FGA 51.2 - A side-looking "X" band AESA radar
- FGA 51.3 - A side-looking "P" band AESA radar

== See also ==
- List of radars
