= TJV =

TJV may refer to:

- TJV, the IATA code for Thanjavur Air Force Station, Tamil Nadu, India
- TJV, the UCI code for Team Jumbo–Visma (men's team), Netherlands
