= No. 102 Squadron IAF =

No. 102 Squadron Trisonics
- No. 102 Squadron IAF "Trisonics"
- Active: 25 August 1981 – 1 May 2006; January 2011 – present
- Country: Republic of India
- Allegiance: Indian Armed Forces
- Branch: Indian Air Force
- Role: Reconnaissance
- Garrison/HQ: AFS Chabua
- Nickname: "Trisonics"
- Motto: Samdhanam Ripudamanayah

Aircraft flown
- Fighter: Su-30MKI

No. 102 Squadron IAF nicknamed as Trisonics is an Indian fighter squadron, equipped with the Su-30MKI and based at Chabua Air Force Station.

== History ==
The squadron was raised as the 102 Survey Flight at Barrackpore in December 1951 with one B-24M. Later two Dakotas and two Doves were added and the unit moved to Palam.

In 1959, they were merged with the 106(SR) Squadron "Lynx".

102 Squadron reformed on the MiG-25RBK/RU Foxbat (Garuda) in August 1981.

The Squadron ceased to exist in 2003 and all assets were transferred to 35 Squadron "Rapiers".

The squadron was re-formed in March 2011 and now fly the Su-30MKI.

== Secret Reconnaissance Mission ==
In May 1997, a MiG-25RBK aircraft from 102 Squadron broke the sound barrier over Islamabad while undertaking one of its many secret reconnaissance missions over Pakistan, emitting a sonic boom. The sound was mistaken for a bomb blast. While the Indian Air Force made no official claims about this secret reconnaissance mission, Pakistan did make a statement. It claimed that the pilot aboard the Indian MiG-25 aircraft deliberately sent the sonic boom to remind the Pakistan Air Force that it had no equal in its inventory. Despite a fully loaded weight of 40 tonnes, it flew 50 km per minute, faster than a bullet. At its fastest speed, it could even zip faster than missiles. Thus, it was considered the right weapon for spying. The MiG-25 was fitted with powerful 1,200 mm cameras that captured photographs even as it flew thrice the speed of sound, at an altitude three times the height of Mount Everest. Its cameras could check on Delhi without leaving Bareilly. This meant that if it flew over Punjab or Kashmir, it could easily check on Pakistan too.

== Aircraft ==
Aircraft types operated by 102 Squadron
Aircraft type	From	To	Air base
MiG-25RBK	September 1981	1 May 2006	
Su-30MKI	January 2011	Present	AFS Chabua
