= No. 222 Squadron IAF =

No. 222 Squadron Tigersharks
- Insignia of The No. 222 Squadron "Tiger Sharks"
- Active: 15 September 1969 — May 1981; December 1985 — March 2011; 20 January 2020 — Present
- Country: Republic of India
- Allegiance: Indian Armed Forces
- Branch: Indian Air Force
- Role: Maritime Strike
- Garrison/HQ: Thanjavur AFS
- Nickname: "Tigersharks"
- Mottos: विनाशाय च दुष्कृताम् Destroyer of Evil
- Equipment: Sukhoi Su-30MKI

No. 222 Squadron also known as Tigersharks is a maritime strike unit based in Thanjavur. It is the first Sukhoi Su-30 MKI squadron based in southern India and is the also the first squadron equipped with air launched BrahMos cruise missile.

== History ==
=== 1971 Indo-Pakistan War ===
A Su-7 used by the Tigersharks

No. 222 Squadron was raised at Ambala on 15 September 1969, with Sukhoi Su-7 aircraft. In July 1971, the Squadron was moved to Halwara, and was soon engaged in combat with the PAF.

The squadron carried out counter-air strikes against Risalewala and Chander airfields with immense success, despite stiff opposition. It provided CAS to ground units in the Dra-Baba-Nanak, Husseinwala and Firozpur sectors. The squadron virtually paralysed the Pakistani armour thrust, due to numerous strikes against enemy gunning positions, armour, and troops, exposing weak flanks to the ground forces.

Short term interdiction missions were directed against rolling stock, rail tracks, marshalling yeards, bridges and enemy convoys. In this the Squadron achieved remarkable success. It conducted photo recon missions against enemy radar positions, deep inside enemy territory.

The Squadron was highly decorated for its role in the war, including one MVC, 3 VrCs, 3 VMs, and two Mentions in Despatches.

=== Post-War period ===
In May 1975, the squadron was shifted back to Ambala, and continued to operate there until 1981, when it shifted to Hindon on 14 May 1981. In December 1985, the Tigersharks became the first Indian squadron to be equipped with the MiG 27 Bahadur aircraft. The then Prime Minister, Rajiv Gandhi, visited the squadron and renamed it to its current name, Tigersharks. On 19 May 1989, they were moved to Hasimara where they were active till 2011.

It was reactivated with Sukhoi Su-30 MKI on 20 January 2020 at Thanjavur Air force base with responsibility for Maritime Recconnsainse and Maritime Strike role over IOR region.

=== Aircraft ===
Aircraft types operated by the squadron

Aircraft type	From	To	Air base
Sukhoi Su-7	15 September 1969	July 1971	Ambala AFS
Sukhoi Su-7	July 1971	May 1975	Halwara AFS
Sukhoi Su-7	May 1975	May 1981	Ambala AFS
Mikoyan MiG-27	December 1985	May 1989	Hindan AFS
Mikoyan MiG-27	19 May 1989	March 2011	Hasimara AFS
Sukhoi Su-30MKI	20 January 2020	Present	Thanjavur AFS
