= No. 31 Squadron IAF =

No. 31 Squadron Lions
- Active: 1 September 1963 — October 2003; January 2009 — Present
- Country: Republic of India
- Allegiance: Indian Armed Forces
- Branch: Indian Air Force
- Role: Fighter
- Garrison/HQ: Jodhpur AFS
- Nickname: "Lions"
- Mottos: Shatru Chhidrey Prahret; A Kill with every blow

Aircraft flown
- Fighter: Sukhoi Su-30MKI

No. 31 Squadron IAF, nicknamed the Lions, is a Ground Attack squadron of the Indian Air Force, equipped with Su-30MKI aircraft operating from Jodhpur Air Force Station.

== History ==
The squadron was formed as a ground attack squadron on 1 September 1963, as part of the expansion of the Indian Air Force in the aftermath of the 1962 War with China. Upon establishment, the squadron was equipped with Mystère fighter-bombers.

=== Indo-Pakistan War of 1965 ===
In the 1965 War with Pakistan, the Lions, commanded by Wing Commander W.M. Goodman, operated from Pathankot and were assigned to fly missions against various ground targets in the sector. On 1 September, Pakistan launched its offensive in the Chhamb Sector, in an effort to cut off communication lines to Kashmir. The Lions were tasked to attack the armoured units. Between 2 and 6 September, the Lions flew several sorties during which they destroyed several tanks, and blunted the offensive. The squadron also flew several reconnaissance sorties and ground attack missions in the sector, performing rocket attacks on tank concentrations at Troti and Chhamb, and strafing Pakistani positions at Jaurian.

On 9 September, two No. 31 Squadron aircraft flew a photo recon and strike mission between Kasur and Raiwind. They attacked a train transporting tanks to the front-line, destroying twenty of them. The Lions also attacked and destroyed a tank and heavy gun concentration at Chawinda. Most of the squadron's missions were led by the Goodman, and he was awarded the Maha Vir Chakra for conspicuous gallantry, leadership, and professional skill, while another pilot was awarded a Vir Chakra for these missions.

== Aircraft ==
Aircraft	From	To	Air Base
Dassault Mystère IV	1 September 1963	February 1973	AFS Halwara
HAL HF-24 Marut	February 1973	April 1983	
MiG-23 BN	April 1983	October 2003	
Sukhoi Su-30 MKI	February 2009	September 2011	AFS Lohegaon
Sukhoi Su-30 MKI	November 2011	Present	AFS Jodhpur
