= Sukhoi Su-30MKI =

Indian variant of Russian-origin Sukhoi Su-30 fighter aircraft

Su-30MKI
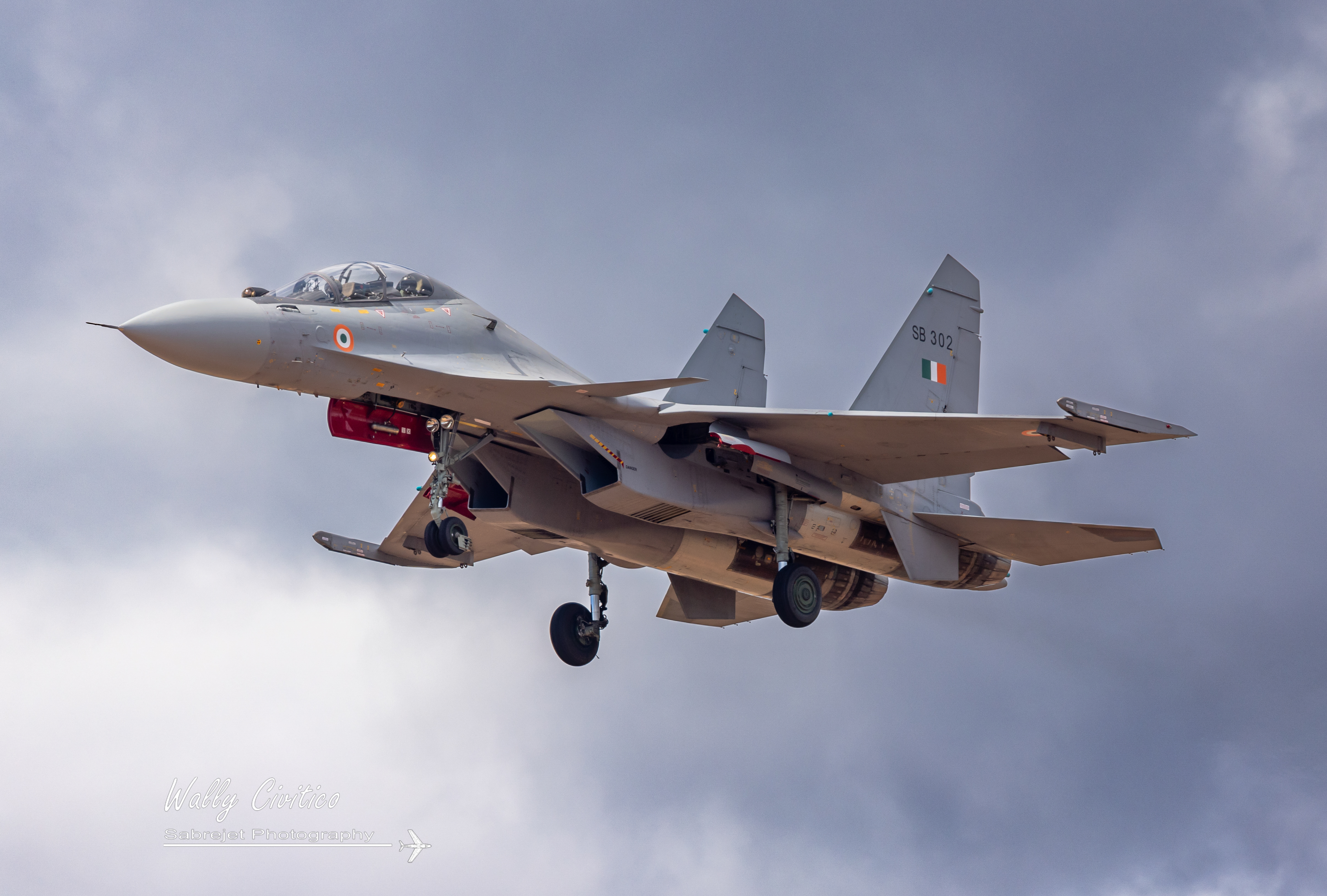
- An Indian Air Force Su-30MKI

General information
- Type: Multirole fighter, air superiority fighter, fighter-bomber
- National origin: Russia / India
- Manufacturer: Hindustan Aeronautics Limited
- Designer: Sukhoi
- Status: In service
- Primary user: Indian Air Force
- Number built: 272 as of March 2020

History
- Manufactured: Su-30MKI: 2000–present
- Introduction date: 27 September 2002
- First flight: Su-30МК: 1 July 1997; 29 years ago Su-30MKI: 2000; 26 years ago
- Developed from: Sukhoi Su-30
- Variants: Sukhoi Su-30MKM; Sukhoi Su-30MKA

The Sukhoi Su-30MKI (Note: MKI stands for Russian Модернизированный Коммерческий Индийский, transliteration Modernizirovannyy Kommercheskiy Indiyskiy, meaning "Modernised Commercial for India".) (NATO reporting name: Flanker-H) is a two-seater, twinjet multirole air superiority fighter developed by Russian aircraft manufacturer Sukhoi and built under licence by India's Hindustan Aeronautics Limited (HAL) for the Indian Air Force (IAF). A variant of the Sukhoi Su-30, it is a heavy, all-weather, long-range fighter.

Development of the variant started after India signed a deal with Russia in 2000 to manufacture 140 Su-30 fighter aircraft. The first Russian-made Su-30MKI variant was accepted into the Indian Air Force in 2002, while the first Su-30MKI assembled in India entered service with the IAF in November 2004. The IAF has nearly 260 Su-30MKIs in inventory as of January 2020. The Su-30MKI was expected to form the backbone of the IAF's fighter fleet beyond 2020.

The aircraft is tailor-made for Indian specifications and integrates Indian systems and avionics as well as French and Israeli sub-systems. It has abilities similar to the Sukhoi Su-35 with which it shares many features and components. (Note: A close cousin of the Su-30MKI is the Malaysian version, the Su-30MKM.)

== Development ==
=== Origins and acquisition ===
The Su-30MKI was designed by Russia's Sukhoi Corporation beginning in 1995 and built under licence by India's Hindustan Aeronautics Limited (HAL). The Su-30MKI is derived from the Sukhoi Su-27 and combines technology from the Su-37 demonstrator and Su-30 program, being more advanced than the baseline Su-30. Russia's Defence Ministry was impressed with the type's performance envelope and ordered 30 Su-30SMs and a localised Su-30MKI, for the Russian Air Force. It features state-of-the-art avionics developed by Russia, India and Israel for display, navigation, targeting and electronic warfare; France and South Africa provided other avionics. The Su-30MK variants were equipped with a N001 ‘Myech’ radar and armed with the R-27 and later the R-77 missile systems.

After two years of evaluation and negotiations, on 30 November 1996, India signed a US$1.462 billion deal with Sukhoi for 50 Russian-produced Su-30MKIs in five batches. The first batch was eight Su-30Ks, the basic export version of Su-30 (designated Su-30MKI-I by India). The second batch of 10 was also Su-30Ks, but equipped with French and Israeli avionics (designated Su-30MKI-I by India). The third batch were to be 10 Su-30MKIs featuring canard foreplanes. The fourth batch of 12 Su-30MKIs and fifth batch of 10 Su-30MKIs were to have the AL-31FP turbofans. The Su-30Ks were upgraded to Su-30MKI configuration by HAL later on. The 18 Su-30Ks were returned to Russia in 2007 for a similar number of Su-30MKIs. Following refurbishment in Belarus, 12 of them were sold to Angola in 2017 and 2019 and the remaining six to Ethiopia in 2024, despite requests to maintain the platforms as testbed aircraft.

In October 2000, a memorandum of understanding (MoU) was signed for Indian licence production of 140 Su-30MKIs; in December 2000, a deal was sealed at Russia's Irkutsk aircraft plant for full technology transfer. The Indian Air Force (IAF) has ordered 272 aircraft, of which 50 were to be delivered by Russia in 2002-2004 and 2007. The rest of the 222 planes are to be produced under licence at HAL's Indian facilities in 2004. The first Nashik-built Su-30MKIs were to be delivered by 2004, with staggered production until 2017–18. In November 2002, the delivery schedule was expedited with production to be completed by 2015. An estimated 920 AL-31FP turbofans are to be manufactured at HAL's Koraput Division, while the mainframe and other accessories are to be manufactured at HAL's Lucknow and Hyderabad divisions. Final integration and test flights of the aircraft are carried out at HAL's Nasik Division. Four manufacturing phases were outlined with progressively increasing Indian content: Phase I, II, III and IV. In Phase I, HAL manufactured the Su-30MKIs from knocked-down kits, transitioning to semi-knockdown kits in Phase II and III; in Phase IV, HAL produced aircraft from scratch from 2013 onwards.

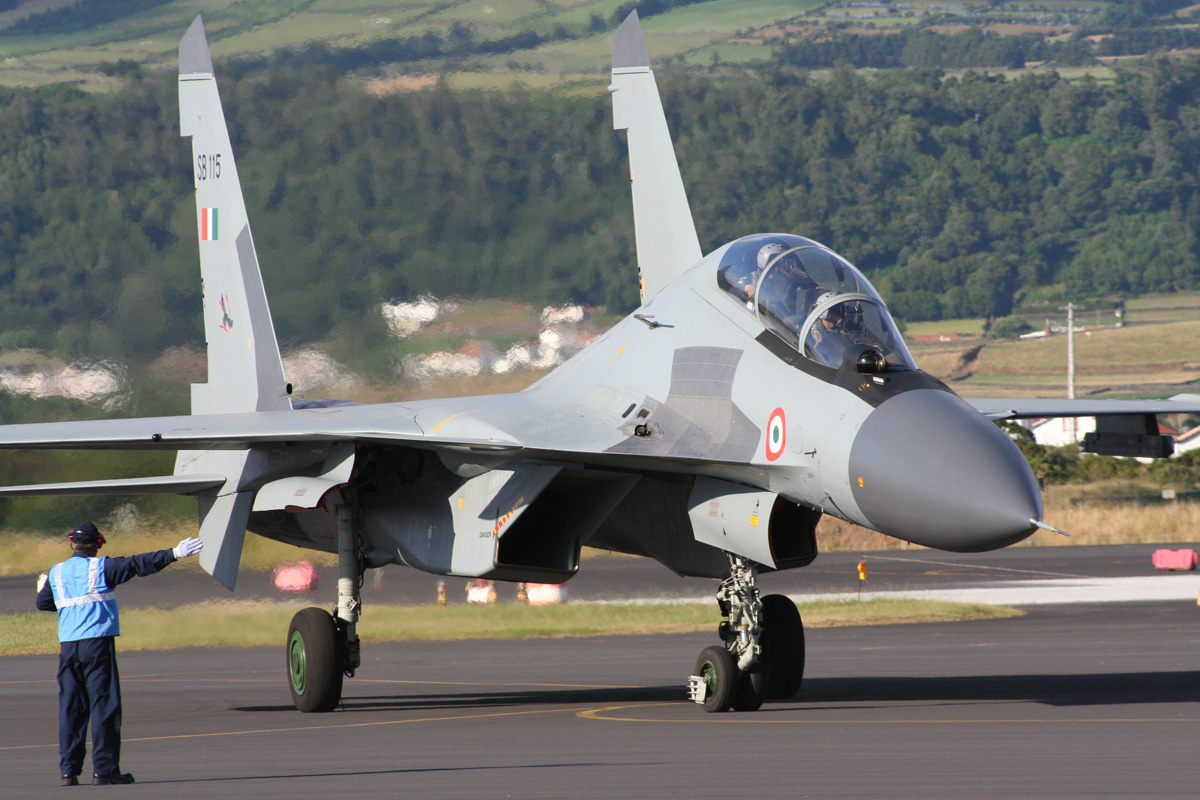
IAF Su-30MKI

In 2007, another order of 40 Su-30MKIs was placed. In 2009, the planned fleet strength was to be 230 aircraft. In 2008, Samtel HAL Display Systems (SHDS), a joint venture between Samtel Display Systems and HAL, won a contract to develop and manufacture multi-function avionics displays for the MKI. A helmet mounted display, Topsight-I, based on technology from Thales and developed by SHDS will be integrated on the Su-30MKI in the next upgrade. In March 2010, it was reported that India and Russia were discussing a contract for 42 more Su-30MKIs. In June 2010, it was reported that the Cabinet Committee on Security had cleared the ₹15,000 crore (US$1.6 billion) deal and that the 42 aircraft would be in service by 2018.

By August 2010, the cost increased to $4.3 billion or $102 million each. This increased unit cost compared to the previous unit cost of $40 million in 2007, led to rumours that the latest order of 42 Su-30MKIs are for the Strategic Forces Command (SFC) and these aircraft will be optimised and hardwired for nuclear weapons delivery. The SFC had previously submitted a proposal to the Indian Ministry of Defence for setting up two dedicated squadrons of fighters consisting of 40 aircraft capable of delivering nuclear weapons.

HAL expected that indigenisation of the Su-30MKI programme would be completed by 2010; V. Balakrishnan, general manager of the Aircraft Manufacturing Division stated that "HAL will achieve 100 per cent indigenisation of the Sukhoi aircraft – from the production of raw materials to the final plane assembly". As of 2017, HAL manufactures more than 80% of the aircraft. On 11 October 2012, the Indian Government confirmed plans to buy another 42 Su-30MKI aircraft. On 24 December 2012, India ordered assembly kits for 42 Su-30MKIs by signing a deal during President Putin's visit to India. This increases India's order total to 272 Su-30MKIs.

As of 2024, the IAF has received a total of 272 units of Su-30MKI, with phased orders of 50 units directly imported followed by orders of 140 units in December 2000, 40 in March 2007 and 42 in December 2012.

=== Additional purchase ===
On June 2018, India reportedly decided not to order any further Su-30s since it considered the cost of maintenance very high compared to Western aircraft. However, on June 2020, India reversed its decision and ordered 12 more Su-30MKIs along with 21 MiG-29s. The Su-30MKI order was to compensate for losses due to crashes and maintain the sanctioned strength of 272 Su-30MKIs. The MiG-29 order was placed to form a fourth MiG-29 squadron to bolster depleted IAF strength. The MiGs were ordered despite being an older platform since they were deliverable within a 2-3-year timeframe, having been built for an order that was previously cancelled, and since they were very reasonably priced compared to newer aircraft. On 18 March 2022, it was reported that India would order an additional 12 Su-30MKIs.

In May 2022, the Indian government suspended the Su-30MKI order due to concerns over Russia's ability to deliver parts to Hindustan Aeronautics and issues related to payment transfers. On 15 September 2023, the Indian government preliminarily approved ₹11,500 crore (equivalent to ₹130 billion or US$1.3 billion in 2026) to obtain 12 Su-30MKIs for the air force with more than 60% indigenous content to replace jets that had crashed. The additional Su30MKIs will be incorporated with the Super Sukhoi upgrades. As of November 2024, the order is expected to be finalised by the end of FY2024–25. On 12 December 2024, the Cabinet Committee on Security cleared the procurement at a cost of ₹13,500 crore (US$1.4 billion). The contract was signed on the same day. These aircraft will feature an indigenous content of around 62.6%.

HAL will restart operations of its Nashik plant near the Nashik Airport to execute the order. The same facility had previously produced 272 units of the jet earlier. A dozen of "new material kits" to fulfil the 12 Su-30MKI contract requirements had arrived from Russia in April 2026. As per August 2026 reports, the aircraft will be delivered between FY2027–28 and 2029.

=== Upgrades ===
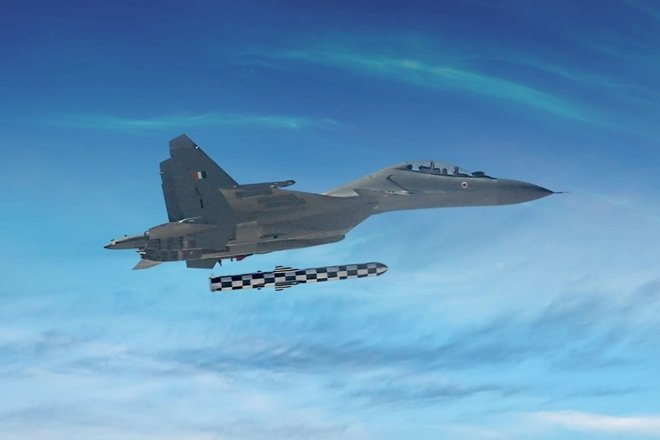
IAF Su-30MKI firing Brahmos-ER

In 2004, India signed a deal with Russia to domestically produce the Novator K-100 missile, designed to shoot down airborne early warning and control (AEW&C) and C4ISTAR aircraft, for the Su-30MKI, however the project did not proceed.

In May 2010, India Today reported that Russia had won a contract to upgrade 40 Su-30MKIs with new radars, onboard computers, electronic warfare systems and the ability to carry the BrahMos cruise missile. The first two prototypes with the "Super-30" upgrade would be delivered to the IAF in 2012, after which the upgrades would be performed on the last batch of 40 production aircraft. The BrahMos missile integrated on the Su-30MKI will provide the capability to attack ground targets from stand-off ranges of around 300 km. On 25 June 2016, HAL conducted the first test flight of a Su-30MKI fitted with a BrahMos-A missile from Nashik, India. The first air launch of BrahMos from a Su-30MKI was successfully carried out on 22 November 2017.

The Indian Defence Ministry proposed several upgrades for the Su-30MKI to the Indian Parliament, including the fitting of Russian Phazotron Zhuk-AE Active Electronically Scanned Array (AESA) radars starting in 2012. During MMRCA trials the Zhuk-AE AESA radar demonstrated significant capabilities, including ground-mapping modes and the ability to detect and track aerial targets. At the 2011 MAKS air-show, Irkut chairman Alexy Fedorov offered an upgrade package with an improved radar, and reduced radar signature to the Indian fleet to make them "Super Sukhois".

But the plan for equipping the jets with Russian AESA radar was dropped in favour of phase wise upgradation of the jets with Indian avionics like by equipping the jets with an enlarged variant of Indian made Uttam AESA radar that was developed for the HAL LCA. India also started to replace the Russian made fly-by-wire system with an Indian made flight-control system and even adopted a new digital Radar Warning Receiver (RWR) to replace the outdated manual radar warning receivers previously employed.

In 2011, India issued a request for information to MBDA for the integration of the Brimstone ground attack missile and the long-range Meteor air-to-air missile.

In 2012, upgrades of the earlier 80 Su-30MKIs involved equipping them with stand-off missiles with a range of 300 km; a request for information (RFI) was issued for such weapons.

In August 2017, the Indian government cleared a proposal of ₹30,000 crore (US$3 billion) to equip the planes with new reconnaissance pods.

In September 2019, reports suggested that the entire fleet of the Su-30MKI is being armed with the indigenous Astra missile, with a range of 110 km, to incorporate beyond visual range (BVR) engagement capability as well as the Israeli Derby missile after due to the "inadequate performance" of the Russian R-77 active-radar homing BVR missile. In September 2019, the Astra missile was in multiple user-trials by Indian Air Force to validate its lethality for the Su-30MKI.

Although not initially designed to carry nuclear or strategic weapons, India has considered integrating an air-launched version of the nuclear-capable Nirbhay cruise missile.

=== Super Sukhoi project ===
In 2024, the Super Sukhoi project — a programme to upgrade IAF's Su-30MKI, considered the backbone of its fleet — was first announced. The upgrade included the introduction of AESA radars, long-range weapons and electronic warfare suite (EWS) to the fleet in order to extend its service life by 30 years. Additionally, the Su-30MKI will have Suppression of Enemy Air Defenses (SEAD) capabilities along with offensives against ground targets in contested airspace. The upgrade is to be carried out by Hindustan Aeronautics Limited (HAL) with the support of Defence Research and Development Organisation (DRDO) and several private companies. Overall, 51 systems are to be upgraded including 30 by HAL, 13 by DRDO and 8 by private sector companies. The Indian indigenous content is planned to be increased to 78%. The upgrade is to allow the fighter to remain in service beyond 2055.

Under this upgrade, many older Russian subsystems will be replaced by more modern Indian subsystems. Initially, around 90 aircraft will be upgraded to these standards. According to a report, "The project is divided into two phases, focusing initially on installing new avionics and radars, followed by enhancements to the flight control systems." "The upgrade will see significant private sector participation, with HAL as the lead integrator," CMD of HAL CB Ananthakrishnan said.

The Defence Acquisition Council (DAC) had granted Acceptance of Necessity (AoN) for the ₹66,829 crore (equivalent to ₹690 billion or US$7.4 billion in 2026) upgrade programme on 30 November 2023.

The financial aspects of the upgrade programme was being assessed in November 2024. This will be followed by government clearance, which is expected early 2025. The first phase of the project, will include the upgradation of 84 jets which will take 15 years, including testing and certification process, followed by the upgrade process which will take 5 to 7 years.

The project is likely to be reviewed in the first week of July 2025, by the DAC under the Ministry of Defence during a scheduled meeting. As of late October 2025, the ministry was examining the proposal to fast-track its clearance from the Cabinet Committee on Security (CCS). The CCS approval will be followed by the design and development phase. HAL has set a timeline to deliver the initial operational clearance (IOC) and final operational clearance (FOC) version within the fifth and seventh year of CCS nod, respectively. The upgraded aircraft will receive a redesigned cockpit along with new avionics, radars infrared sensors, and a new electronic warfare suite with jammer pods.

Though the project, which is expected to include minor contributions from Russia, was soon expected to receive the CCS clearance on 27 November 2025, the approval was yet to be accorded on 25 February 2026. It was reported that the Indian Air Force is now considering a parallel upgrade programme from Russia for a similar or larger quantity of aircraft. This upgrade, in line with the earlier MiG-21Bison upgrade, will "offset the long execution timeline" of the Super Sukhoi project since the project's final operational clearance (FOC) timeline might not be realised as expected. The parallel project will focus on the electronic warfare suite, radar and the Russian-offered AL-41 engine. If the project is taken up after inter-government talks, the proposal would be sent to the Defence Acquisition Council (DAC) for Acceptance of Necessity (AoN). The AoN marks the first formal stage of a programme. Meanwhile, DRDO is undertaking design work for the Super Sukhoi project from its internal budget. However, a substantial financial support is required for full-scale development and integration which could be realised only after CCS clearance and budget allocation.

The major components of the Super Sukhoi project include:

AESA radar
The current radar is to be replaced with a modern AESA radar named DRDO Virupaakhsha (enhanced variant of Uttam AESA Radar) which will increase the detection range by 1.5 to 1.7 times making the jets capable to operate long range weapons like Astra Mk3.

Electronic warfare suite
In May 2024, DRDO's CASDIC released an Expression of Interest (EoI) to collaborate with a Development-cum-Production Partner (DccP) to develop an indigenous Electronic Warfare suite. The allocated timeframe for Design and Development (D&D) 32 months. This programme includes integration, testing and trials of the system that is developed. On 3 December 2024, the Defence Acquisition Council (DAC) cleared the procurement of Electronic Warfare Suite (EWS) compromising of External Airborne Self Protection Jammer pods, Dhruti Next Generation Radar Warning Receiver, Dual Color Missile Approach Warning System and associated equipment.

On 15 November 2025, the Ministry of Defence released a Request for Information (RFI) to procure 100 sets of Aircraft Self Protection Jammers (ASPJ) complemented by associated equipment for the Su-30MKI aircraft. The last date for a vendor to respond to the RFI is 22 December. The deliveries are to be completed within a timeline of 36 months. The pods must be capable of jamming and spoofing enemy airborne and ground radars.

In May 2026, an RFP was released to upgrade 258 Su-30MKI aircraft with anti-jamming navigation system. The system should be capable of operating at altitudes of up to 69,000 ft (21 km), speeds of up to 1,840 km/h; 1,140 mph (Mach 1.5) and accelerations ranging between -2g and +9g. The bids are to be submitted by 22 June with deliveries to be delivered within 24 months of contract signing. The project included deliveries of 300 antenna systems along with 50 field-level testers and 10 base-level testers.

Long-range weapons
The jets will also be modified to fire BrahMos-ER missiles. Other missiles which are to be integrated on these jets include Rudram-II, Astra series and R-37M missiles. As per reports on 1 March 2026, the air-launched variant of the LR-LACM was expected to enter operational testing shortly. The missile has been developed by the Aeronautical Development Establishment (ADE) and is being prepared for integration with the Sukhoi Su-30MKI.

New engines and others
In August 2024, a report suggested that the Ministry of Defence (MoD) has prepared to sign a deal with HAL to purchase 230 AL-31FP engines under a ₹21,000 crore (equivalent to ₹220 billion or US$2.4 billion in 2026) deal to replace older engines. A total of 950 engines are required. On 2 September, Cabinet Committee on Security (CCS) approved the purchase of 240 such engines for ₹26,000 crore (equivalent to ₹280 billion or US$3.0 billion in 2026). The delivery of the engines will continue from 1 year of signing the contract to 8th year of signing the contract. The engines will be manufactured in HAL's Engine Division Koraput and will have an indigenous content of 54%. The contract was signed officially on 9 September 2024. The first engine was delivered on 1 October 2024 while all the engines will be delivered within 8 years at a production rate of 30 units per year. In October 2026, HAL announced its investment of ₹335 crore (US$36 million) to enhance the annual production rate to 50 units. It had already delivered 63 engines in two years against the target of 60 units.

AI systems
IIT Bombay has been engaged in the development of Artificial Intelligence-based engine and asset maintenance solutions for spares, inventory and combat potential optimisation. This will replace the current electronic maintenance management system. Sukhoi will also be involved in the project for the upgrade of fly-by-wire system.

=== Licensed export ===
In 2024, Indian media reported negotiations between HAL and Russia for exporting Indian-produced Su-30MKIs. This may be to circumvent American economic sanctions on the export of Russian weapons and their technology.

== Design ==
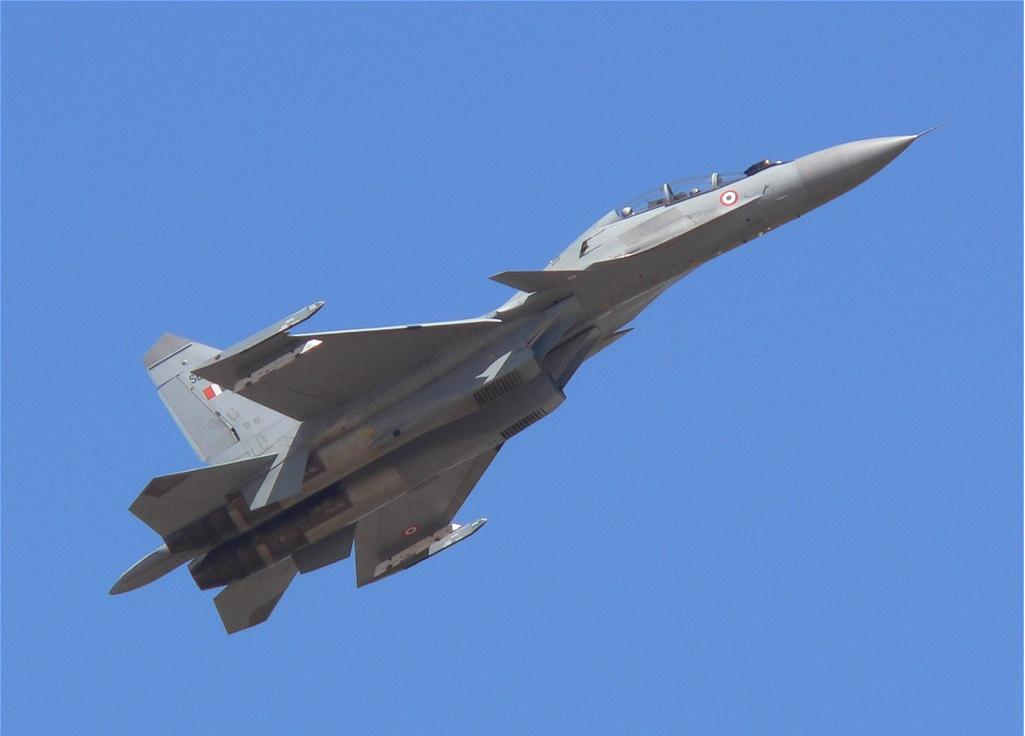
Su-30MKI's canards and thrust vectoring nozzles are two prominent features over the basic MK variant.

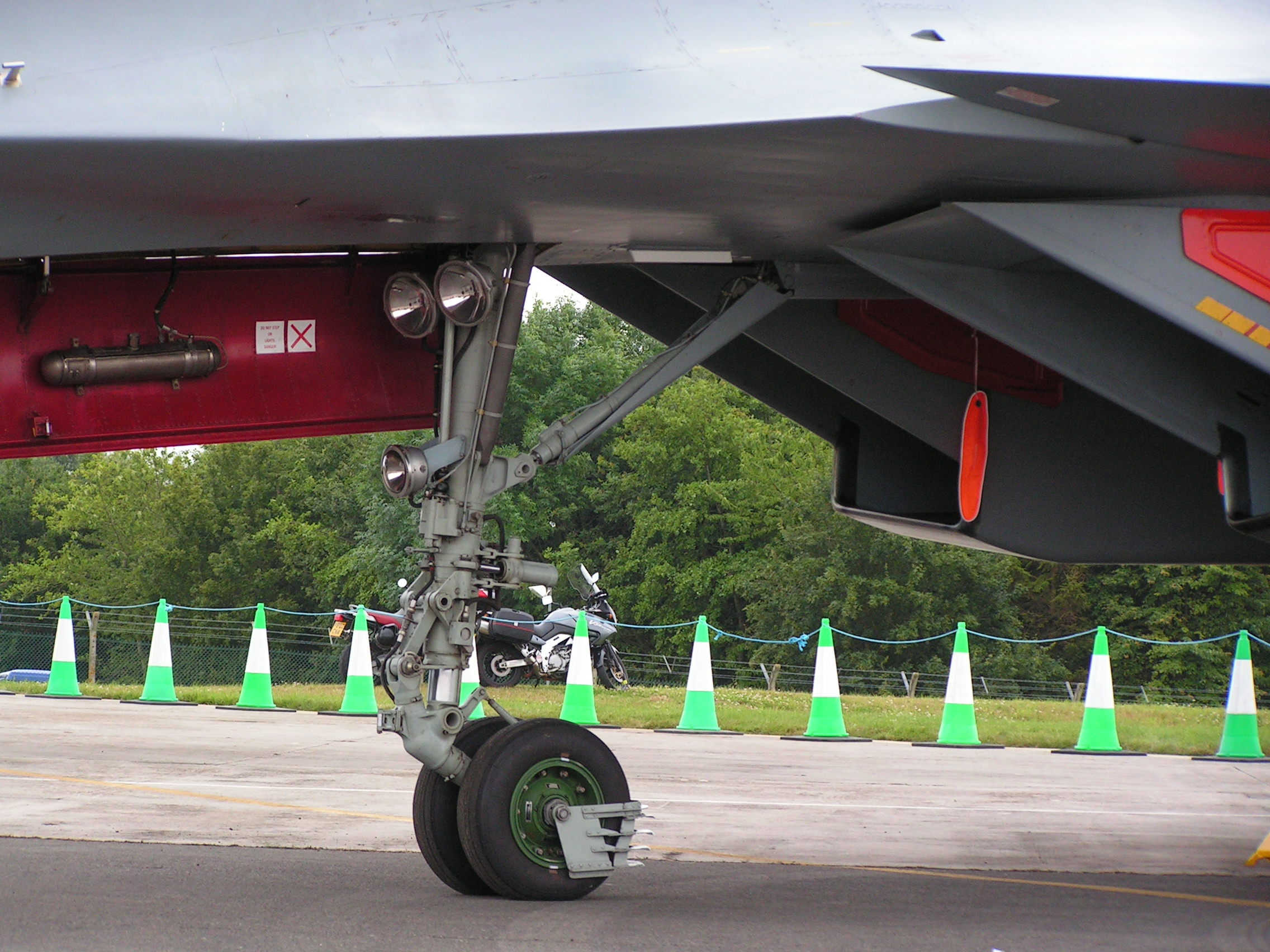
Nosewheel of a Su-30MKI; note the externally mounted drag brace is fixed to the fuselage instead of the gear leg

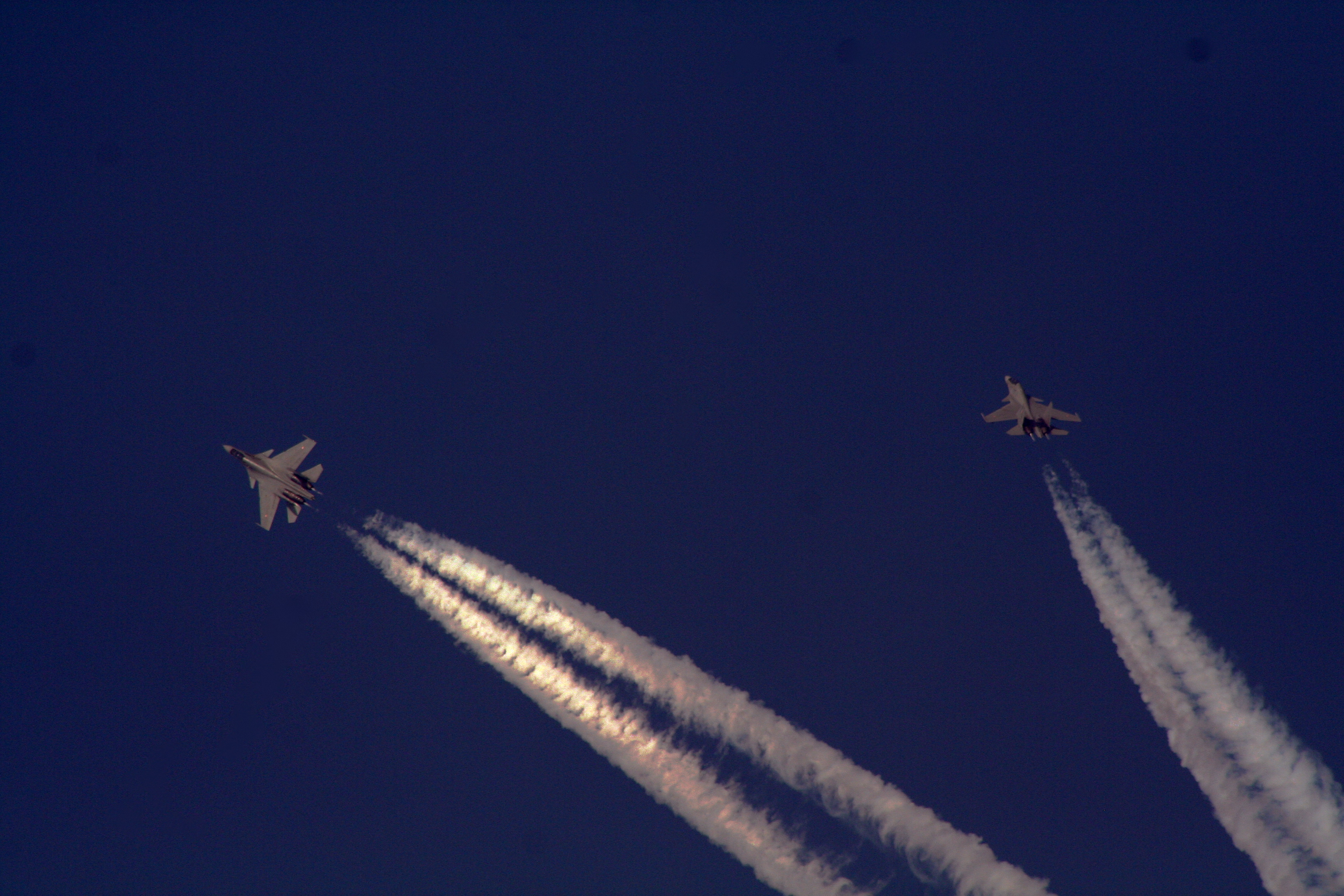
Two Su-30MKIs during a Thach Weave manoeuvre

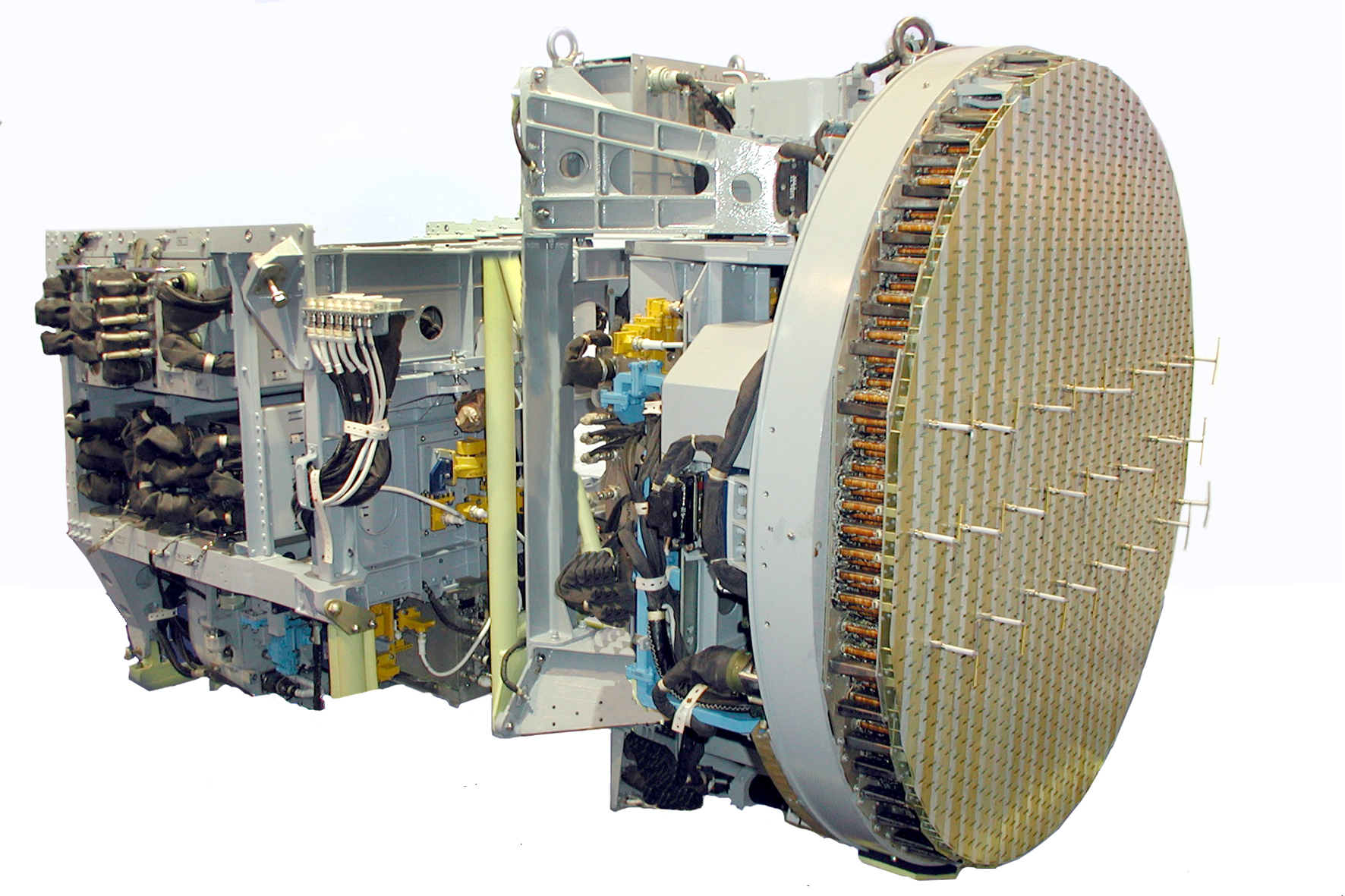
N011M Bars radar

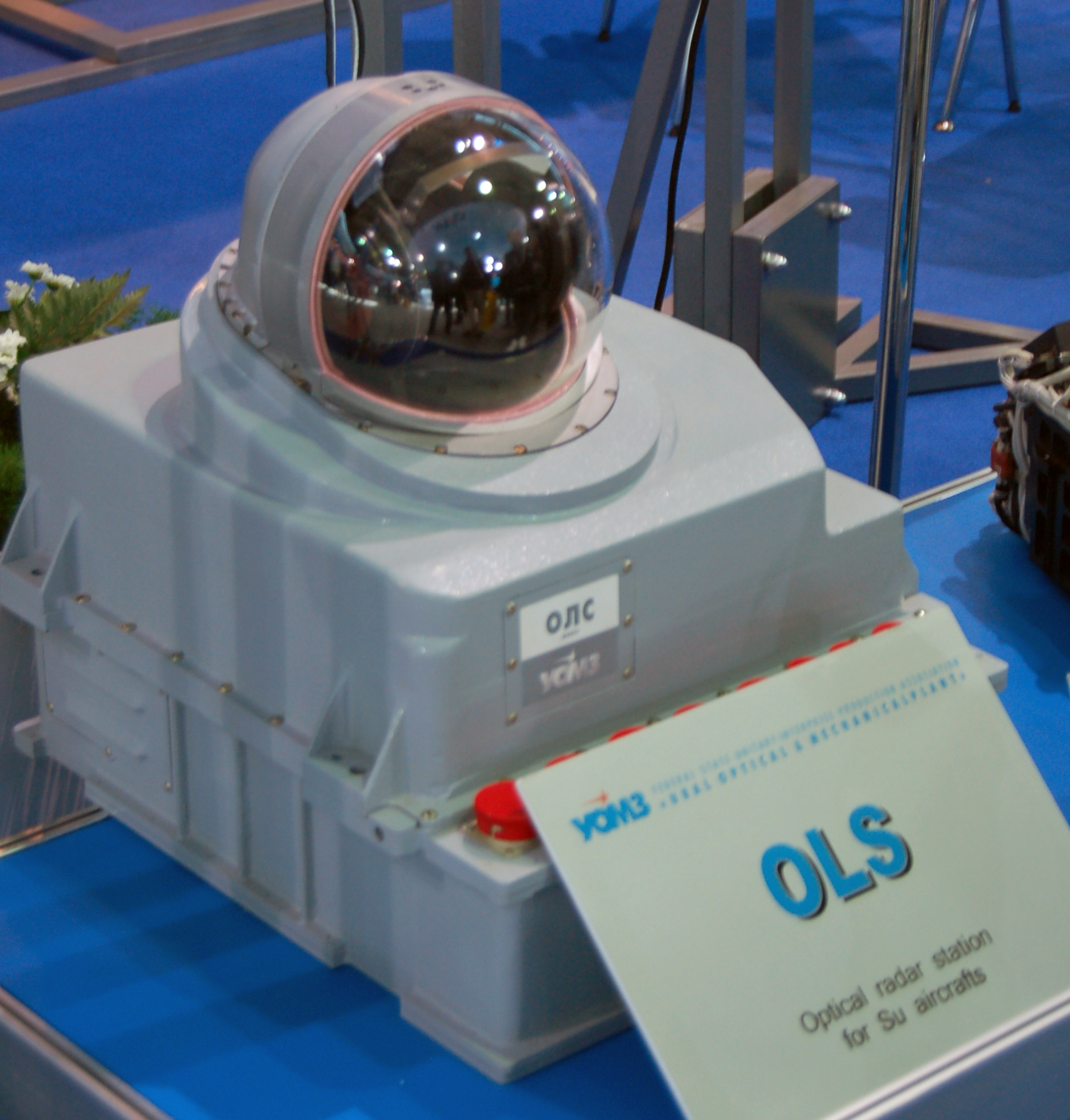
OLS optical detection pod used on Sukhoi aircraft.

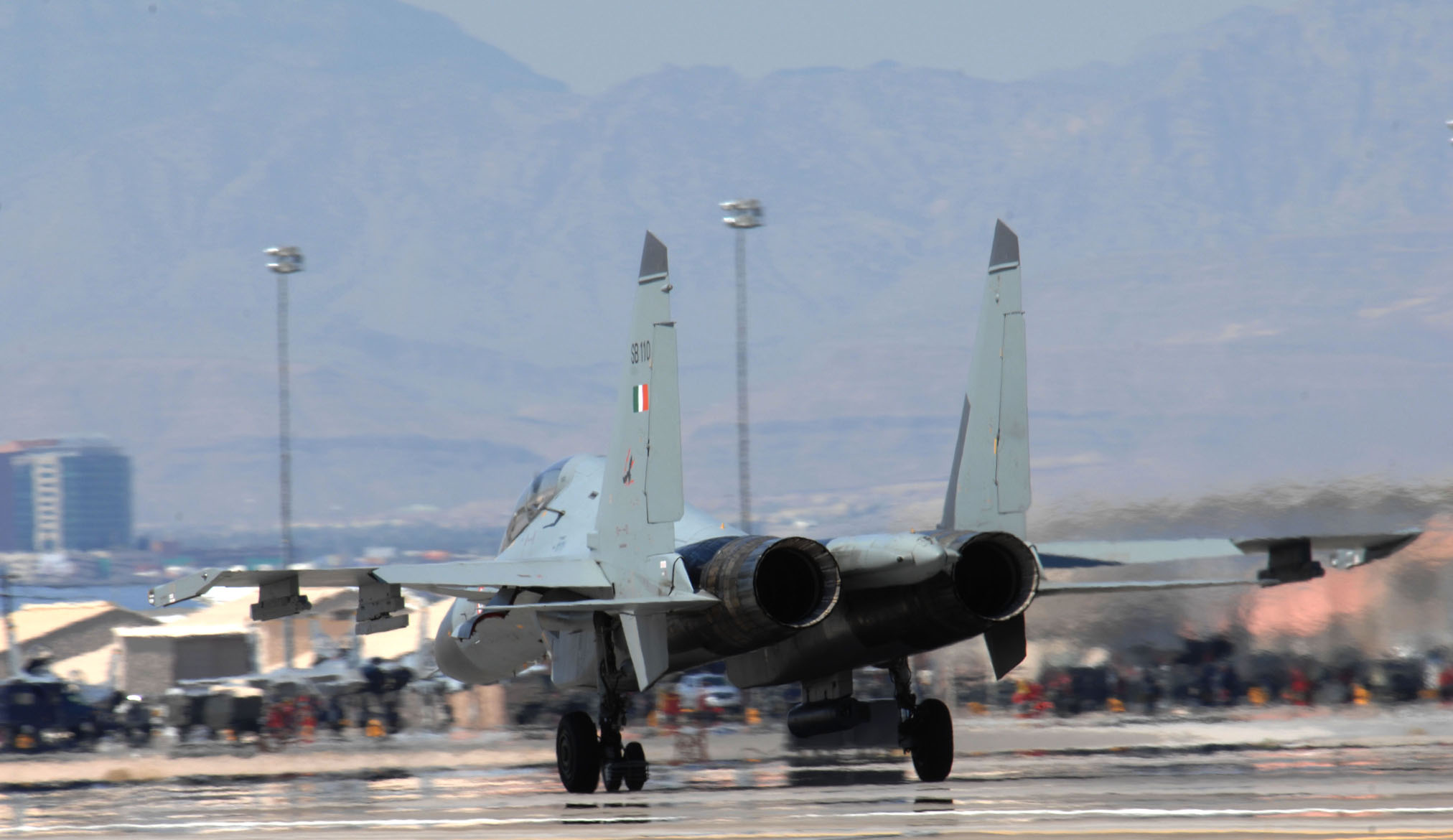
Elta EL/M-8222 Self-Protection Pod mounted on Under wing pylon

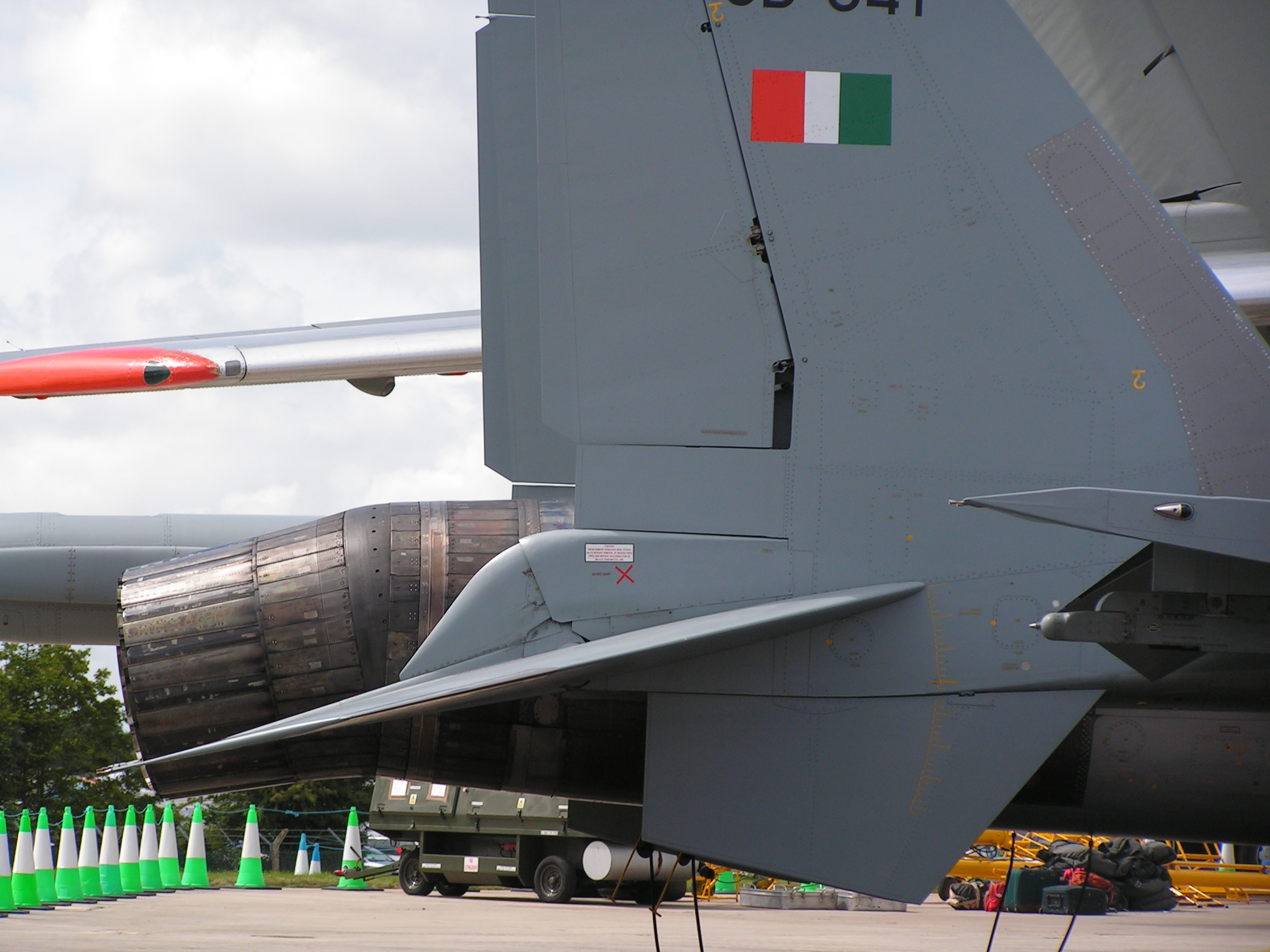
Tail section of a Su-30MKI. Note the thrust vectoring of the engine nozzles

=== Characteristics ===
The Su-30MKI is a highly integrated twin tail aircraft. The airframe is constructed of titanium and high-strength aluminium alloys. The engine intake ramps and nacelles are fitted with trouser fairings to provide a continuous streamlined profile between the nacelles and the tail beams. The fins and horizontal tail consoles are attached to tail beams. The central beam section between the engine nacelles consists of the equipment compartment, fuel tank and the brake parachute container. The fuselage head is of semi-monocoque construction and includes the cockpit, radar compartments and the avionics bay.

Su-30MKI aerodynamic configuration is a longitudinal triplane with relaxed stability. The canard increases the aircraft lift ability and deflects automatically to allow high angle of attack (AoA) flights allowing it to perform cobra manoeuvres. The integral aerodynamic configuration combined with thrust vectoring results in extremely capable manoeuvrability, taking off and landing characteristics. This high agility allows rapid deployment of weapons in any direction as desired by the crew. The canard notably assists in controlling the aircraft at large angles-of-attack and bringing it to a level flight condition. The aircraft has a fly-by-wire (FBW) with quadruple redundancy. Depending on flight conditions, signals from the control stick position transmitter or the flight control system may be coupled to remote control amplifiers and combined with feedback signals from acceleration sensors and rate gyros. The resultant control signals are coupled to the high-speed electro-hydraulic actuators of the elevators, rudders and the canard. The output signals are compared and, if the difference is significant, the faulty channel is disconnected. FBW is based on a stall warning and barrier mechanism which prevents stalls through dramatic increases of control stick pressure, allowing a pilot to effectively control the aircraft without exceeding the angle of attack and acceleration limitations. Although the maximum angle of attack is limited by the canards, the FBW acts as an additional safety mechanism.

The Su-30MKI has a range of 3,000 km with internal fuel which ensures a 3.75 hour combat mission. Also, it has an in-flight refueling (IFR) probe that retracts beside the cockpit during normal operation. The air refueling system increases the flight duration up to 10 hours with a range of 3,000 km combat radius. Su-30MKIs can also use the Cobham 754 buddy refuelling pods.

The Su-30MKI's radar cross-section (RCS) is reportedly from 4 to 20 square metres.

=== Cockpit ===
The displays include a customised version of the Israeli Elbit Su 967 head-up display (HUD) consisting of bi-cubic phase conjugated holographic displays and seven multifunction liquid-crystal displays, six 127 mm × 127 mm and one 152 mm × 152 mm. Flight information is displayed on four LCD screens which include one for piloting and navigation, a tactical situation indicator, and two for display systems information including operating modes and overall status. Variants of this HUD have also been chosen for the IAF's Mikoyan MiG-27 and SEPECAT Jaguar upgrades for standardisation. The rear cockpit has a larger monochrome display for air-to-surface missile guidance.

The Su-30MKI on-board health and usage monitoring system (HUMS) monitors almost every aircraft system and sub-system, and can also act as an engineering data recorder. From 2010, indigenously designed and built HUDs and multi-function displays (MFDs) were produced by the Delhi-based Samtel Group Display Systems.

The crew are provided with zero-zero NPP Zvezda K-36DM ejection seats. The rear seat is raised for better visibility. The cockpit is provided with containers to store food and water reserves, a waste disposal system and extra oxygen bottles. The K-36DM ejection seat is inclined at 30°, to help the pilot resist aircraft accelerations in air combat.

=== Avionics ===
The forward-facing NIIP N011M Bars (Panther) is a powerful integrated passive electronically scanned array (PESA) radar. The N011M is a digital multi-mode dual frequency band radar. The N011M can function in air-to-air and air-to-land/sea mode simultaneously while being tied into a high-precision laser-inertial or GPS navigation system. It is equipped with a modern digital weapons control system as well as anti-jamming features. N011M has a 400 km search range and a maximum 200 km tracking range, and 60 km in the rear hemisphere. The radar can track 15 air targets and engage 4 simultaneously. These targets can even include cruise missiles and motionless helicopters. The Su-30MKI can function as a mini-AWACS as a director or command post for other aircraft. The target co-ordinates can be transferred automatically to at least four other aircraft. The radar can detect ground targets such as tanks at 40–50 km. The Bars radar was planned to be replaced by Zhuk-AESA in all Su-30MKI aircraft, but this has since been abandoned in favour of indigenous upgrades.

OLS-30 laser-optical Infra-red search and track includes a day and night FLIR capability and is used in conjunction with the helmet mounted sighting system. The OLS-30 is a combined IRST/LR device using a cooled, broad waveband sensor. Detection range is up to 90 km, while the laser ranger is effective to 3.5 km. Targets are displayed on the same LCD screen as the radar. Israeli LITENING targeting pod is used to target laser guided munitions. The original Litening pod includes a long range FLIR, a TV camera, laser spot tracker to pick up target designated by other aircraft or ground forces, and an electro-optical point and inertial tracker, which enables engagement of the target even when partly obscured by clouds or countermeasures; it also integrates a laser range-finder and flash-lamp powered laser designator for the delivery of laser-guided bombs, cluster and general-purpose bomb.

The aircraft is fitted with a satellite navigation system (A-737 GPS compatible), which permits it to make flights in all weather, day and night. The navigation complex includes the high accuracy SAGEM Sigma-95 integrated global positioning system and ring laser gyroscope inertial navigation system. Phase 3 of further development of the MKI, will integrate avionic systems being developed for the Indo-Russian Fifth Generation Fighter Aircraft programme.

Sukhoi Su-30MKI has electronic counter-measure systems. The RWR system is of Indian design, developed by India's DRDO, called Tarang, (Wave in English). It has direction finding capability and is known to have a programmable threat library. The RWR is derived from work done on an earlier system for India's MiG-23BNs known as the Tranquil, which is now superseded by the more advanced Tarang series. Elta EL/M-8222 a self-protection jammer developed by Israel Aircraft Industries is the MKI's standard EW pod, which the Israeli Air Force uses on its F-15s. The ELTA El/M-8222 Self Protection Pod is a power-managed jammer, air-cooled system with an ESM receiver integrated into the pod. The pod contains an antenna on the forward and aft ends, which receive the hostile RF signal and after processing deliver the appropriate response.

In April 2022, Bharat Electronics and Hindustan Aeronautics signed a contract for co-development and co-production of long range dual band infra-red search and track system for Su-30MKI. This will replace the current OLS-30 system with an initial order of 100 units. The IRST will feature Television Day Camera, Infrared, UV & Laser sensors in single window for air to air and air to ground target tracking and localisation.

=== Propulsion ===
The Su-30MKI is powered by two Lyulka-Saturn AL-31FP turbofans, each rated at 12,500 kgf (27,550 lbf) of full after-burning thrust, which enable speeds of up to Mach 2 in horizontal flight and a rate of climb of 230 m/s. The mean time between overhaul is reportedly 1,000 hours with a full-life span of 3,000 hours; the titanium nozzle has a mean time between overhaul of 500 hours. In early 2015, Defence Minister Manohar Parrikar stated before Parliament that the AL-31FP had suffered numerous failures, between the end of 2012 and early 2015, a total of 69 Su-30MKI engine-related failures had occurred; commons causes were bearing failures due to metal fatigue and low oil pressure, in response several engine modifications were made to improve lubrication, as well as the use of higher quality oil and adjustments to the fitting of bearings.

The Su-30MKI's AL-31FP power plant built on the earlier AL-31FU, adding two-plane thrust vectoring nozzles are mounted 32 degrees outward to longitudinal engine axis (i.e. in the horizontal plane) and can be deflected ±15 degrees in one plane. The canting allows the aircraft to produce both roll and yaw by vectoring each engine nozzle differently; this allows the aircraft to create thrust vectoring moments about all three rotational axes, pitch, yaw and roll. Engine thrust is adjusted via a conventional engine throttle lever as opposed to a strain-gauge engine control stick. The aircraft is controlled by a standard control stick. The pilot can activate a switch for performing difficult manoeuvres; while this is enabled, the computer automatically determines the deflection angles of the swivelling nozzles and aerodynamic surfaces.

== Operational history ==
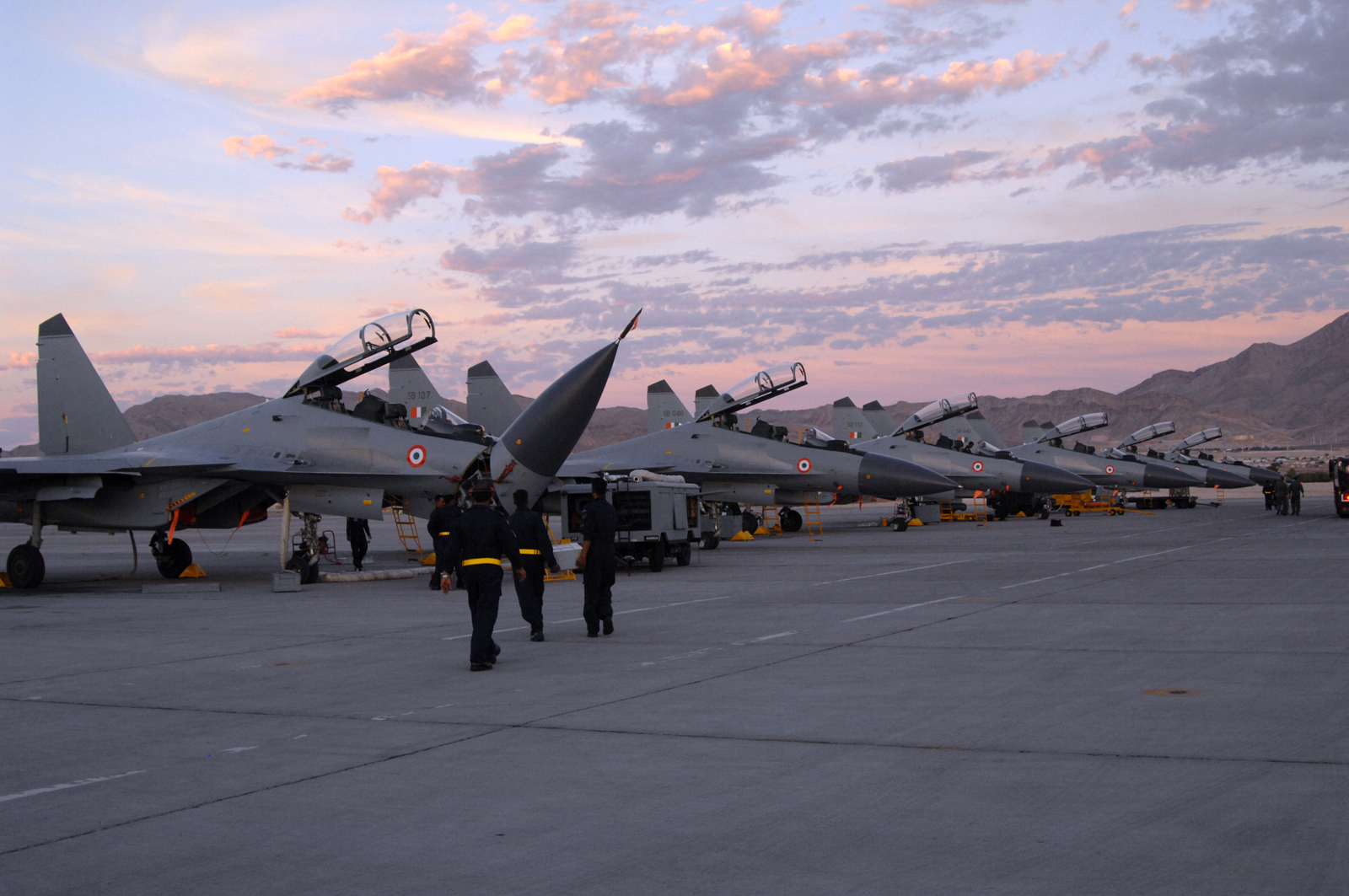
IAF Su-30MKIs deployed to the Nellis Air Force Base to participate in the Red Flag 08-4 air combat exercise

The Sukhoi Su-30MKI is the most potent fighter jet in service with the Indian Air Force in the late 2000s. The MKIs are often fielded by the IAF in bilateral and multilateral air exercises. In 2004, India sent Su-30MKs, the initial variant of the Su-30MKI, to take part in war games with the United States Air Force (USAF) during Cope India 04. The results have been widely publicised, with the Indians winning "90% of the mock combat missions" against the USAF's F-15C. The parameters of the exercise heavily favoured the IAF; none of the six 3rd Wing F-15Cs were equipped with the newer long-range, active electronically scanned array (AESA) radars and, at India's request, the US agreed to mock combat at 3-to-1 odds and without the use of simulated long-range, radar-guided AIM-120 AMRAAMs for beyond-visual-range kills. In Cope India 05, the Su-30MKIs reportedly beat the USAF's F-16s.

India exercised its Su-30MKIs against the Royal Air Force's Tornado ADVs in October 2006. This was the first large-scale bilateral aerial exercise with any foreign air force during which the IAF used its Su-30MKIs extensively. This exercise was also the first in 43 years with the RAF. During the exercise, the RAF Air Chief Marshal Glenn Torpy was given permission by the IAF to fly the MKI. RAF's Air Vice Marshal, Christopher Harper, praised the MKI's dogfight ability, calling it "absolutely masterful in dogfights".

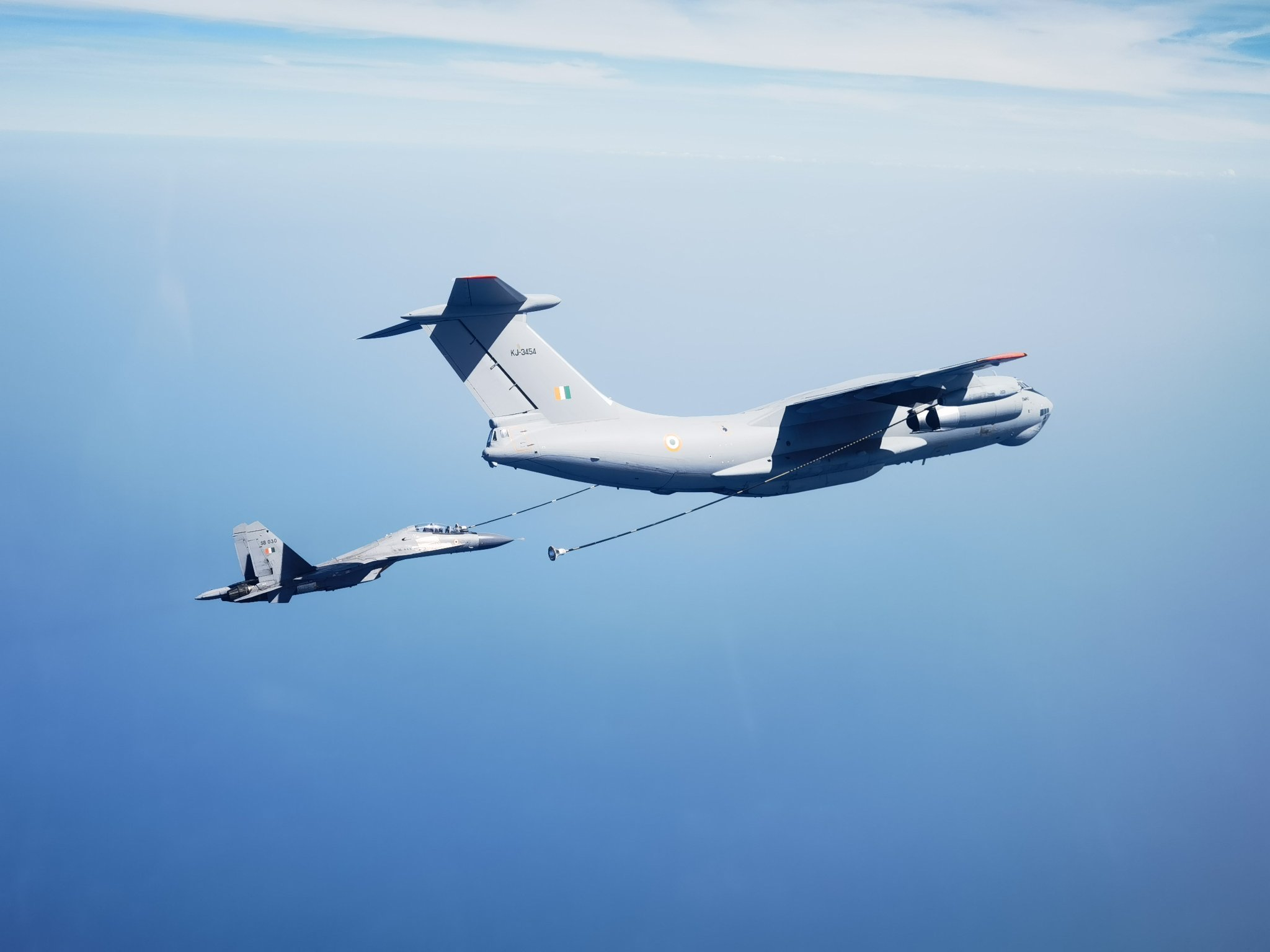
Su-30 MKI doing in-flight refueling from Ilyushin Il-78 during Konkan Shakti 21

In July 2007, the Indian Air Force fielded the Su-30MKI during the Indra-Dhanush exercise with Royal Air Force's Eurofighter Typhoon. This was the first time that the two fighters took part in such an exercise. The IAF did not allow their pilots to use the radar of the MKIs during the exercise so as to protect the highly classified N011M Bars radar system. Also in the exercise were RAF Tornado F3s and a Hawk. RAF Tornado pilots were candid in their admission of the Su-30MKI's superior manoeuvring in the air, and the IAF pilots were impressed by the Typhoon's agility.

In July 2008, the IAF sent 6 Su-30MKIs and 2 Il-78MKI aerial-refueling tankers, to participate in the Red Flag exercise. The IAF again did not allow their pilots to use the radar of the MKIs during the exercise so as to protect the highly classified N011M Bars. In October 2008, a video surfaced on the internet which featured a USAF colonel, Terrence Fornof, criticising Su-30MKI's performance against the F-15C, engine serviceability issues, and high friendly kill rate during the Red Flag exercise. Several of his claims were later rebutted by the Indian side and the USAF also distanced itself from his remarks.

In June 2010, India and France began the fourth round of their joint air exercises, "Garuda", at the Istres Air Base in France. During Garuda, the IAF and the French Air Force were engaged in various missions ranging from close combat engagement of large forces, slow mover protection, protecting and engaging high value aerial assets. This exercise marked the first time the Su-30MKI took part in a military exercise in France.

The IAF took part in the Red Flag exercise in July 2013, at Nellis Air Force Base, Nevada, United States. For the exercise, it is dispatching eight Su-30MKIs, two Lockheed C-130J Hercules tactical aircraft, two Ilyushin Il-78 (NATO reporting name "Midas") mid-air refueling tankers, one Ilyushin Il-76 (NATO reporting name "Candid") heavy-lift aircraft, and over 150 personnel.

The IAF again fielded its MKIs in the Garuda-V exercise with France in June 2014, where they manoeuvred in mixed groups with other IAF aircraft and French Rafales.

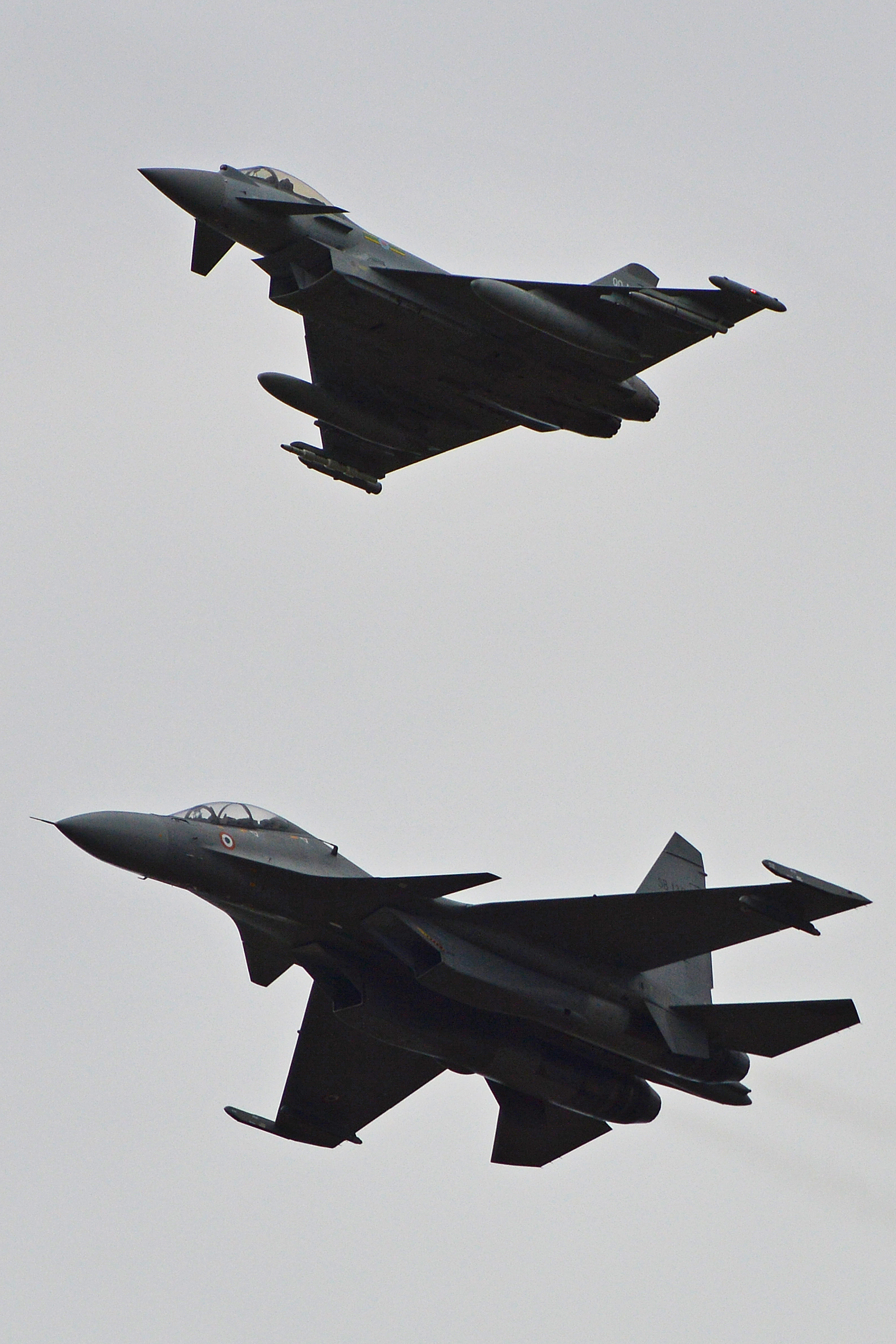
RAF Typhoon and Su-30MKI during Indradhanush 2015

On 21 July 2015, India and UK began the bilateral exercise named Indradhanush with aircraft operating from three Royal Air Force bases. The exercises included both Beyond Visual Range (BVR) and Within Visual Range (WVR) exercises between the Su-30MKI and Eurofighter Typhoon. Indian media reported the results were in favour of the IAF with a score of 12–0 at WVR engagements. They also claim that the IAF Su-30MKIs held an edge over the Typhoons in BVR engagements though not in as dominating a manner. The RAF issued a statement that the results being reported by the Indian media did not reflect the results of the exercise. According to Aviation International News, "In close combat, thrust vector control on the Flankers more than compensated for the greater thrust-to-weight ratio of the Typhoon".

On 26 February 2019, four Sukhoi Su-30MKIs escorted Mirage 2000s into Pakistan for the Balakot airstrike which destroyed a Jaish-e-Mohammed terrorist camp. The following day, two Su-30MKIs on combat air patrol were attacked by multiple Pakistani F-16s using AMRAAM missiles. The jets successfully dodged and jammed multiple missiles. The debris of an AMRAAM missile was later recovered and displayed by the IAF to disprove the Pakistani claim of not using the F-16 as Pakistan can only use the missile with F-16s. PAF claimed that it had downed an Indian Sukhoi Su-30MKI in the aerial skirmish. The Indian Air Force stated that all dispatched Sukhoi aircraft returned safely with the only confirmed loss was a MiG-21. On 8 October 2019, during the Indian Air Force Day celebrations, the IAF flew the Su-30MKI that Pakistan claimed to have shot down.

In 2024, IAF deployed four Su-30MKIs to multinational Exercise Pitch Black 2024 hosted by Royal Australian Air Force which will be held from 12 July to 2 August. The long distance flight is supported by Il-78MKI mid-air refueller, C-17 Globemaster and a halt in Halim, Indonesia. The Indian contingent consists of 150 personnel including pilots, engineers, technicians, controllers, and other subject matter experts. This will be the largest version of the exercise since its inception in 1981. The same contingent participated in Exercise Udara Shakti with Sukhoi Su-30MKM of the Royal Malaysian Air Force which was conducted from 5 to 9 August at Kuantan, Malaysia. The contingent returned to India on 10 August 2024.

On 9 January 2025, Su-30MKI and Jaguar aircraft of the Indian Air Force conducted joint anti-aircraft drills with Rafale M aircraft of the French Navy. The French Carrier Strike Group (CSG) centred on the Charles de Gaulle, the carrier air wing including Rafale M, her escort ships and fleet support ship Jacques Chevallier were on a visit to India between 4 and 9 January 2025 during the Mission Clemenceau 25. Simultaneously, INS Mormugao conducted joint navigational drills and Maritime Partnership Exercise with the escort ships.

From 28 August to 10 September 2025, the Indian Air Force deployed five of its Su-30MKI and a C-17 Globemaster for the multilateral, tri-service Exercise Bright Star.

The 2025 India–Pakistan conflict began when India launched "Operation Sindoor" in the early hours of 7 May 2025, targeting nine alleged terror camps across Pakistan and Pakistan Occupied Kashmir in response to the Pahalgam attack. During the mission, Su-30MKIs of the Indian Air Force provided air defence cover to ensure that Indian strike aircraft could carry out the mission without threat from Pakistani interceptors. On 10 May 2025, the IAF Su-30MKIs reportedly struck 11 PAF airbases with the BrahMos missile resulting in extensive damage to some of them. A flight of Su-30MKIs launched from bases in western India were responsible for the destruction of AEWAC hangers at PAF Base Bholari. France's air chief told reporters in June and claimed that he had seen evidence of the loss of a fighter and two other aircraft including a Russian-made Sukhoi.

=== Potential operators ===
As of November 2025, Armenia plans to order 8 to 12 Su-30MKI fighters. The first phase of the purchase includes the delivery of 8-12 aircraft with personnel training, ground support, and weapons integration. Deliveries are expected by 2027. These fighters will have Indian-only hardware, including the Uttam AESA radar and Astra missiles.

== Operators ==
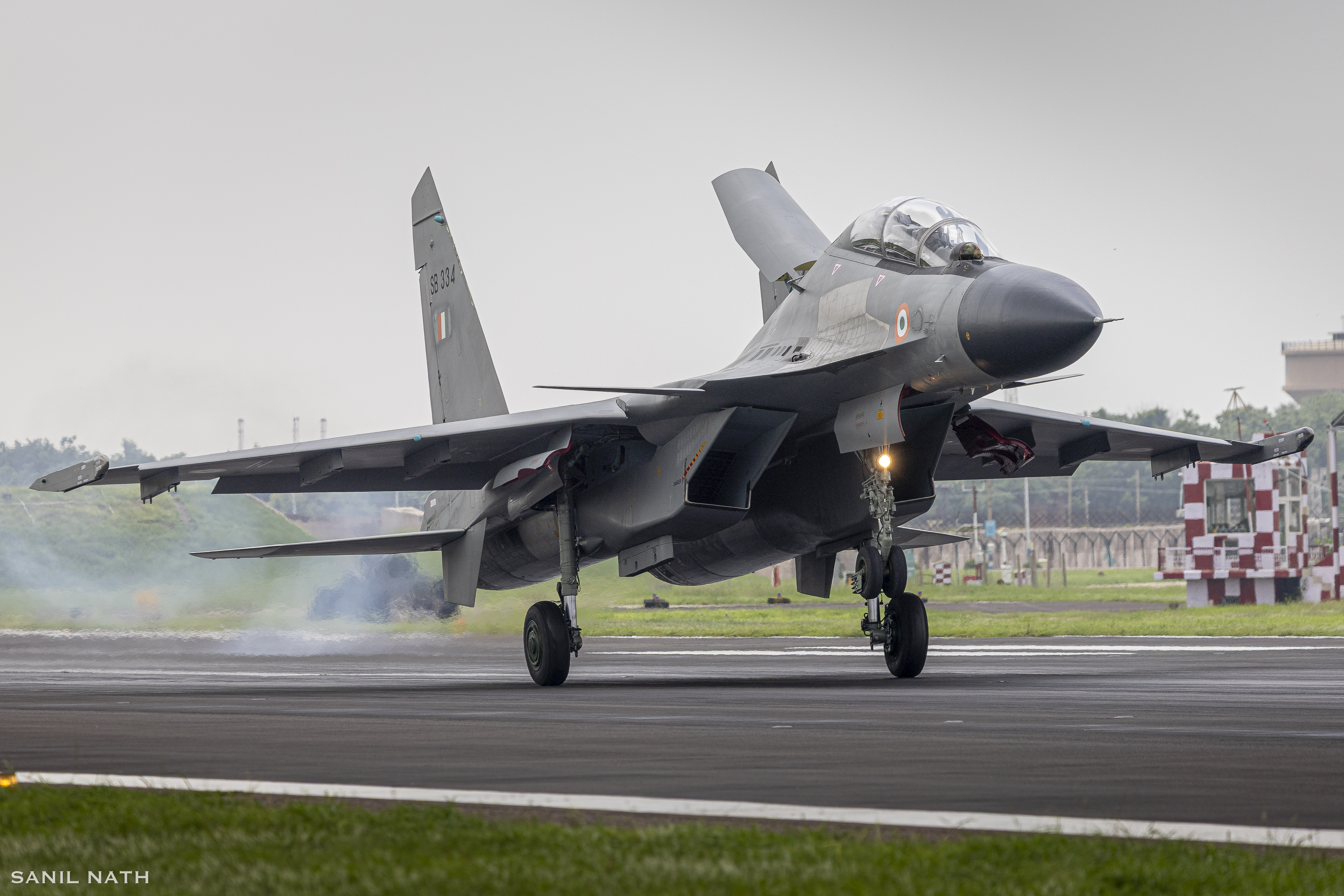
IAF Su-30MKI landing

A Sukhoi Su-30MKI of the No. 102 Squadron IAF flying over Lengeri village, Assam, India.

India

- Indian Air Force – 260 in service. 12 on order.
  - Bareilly AFS: 15 Wing
    - No. 8 Squadron IAF (Eight Pursoots)
    - No. 24 Squadron IAF (Hawks)
  - Chabua AFS: 14 Wing
    - No. 102 Squadron IAF (Trisonics)
  - Halwara AFS: 9 Wing
    - No. 220 Squadron IAF (Desert Tigers)
    - No. 221 Squadron IAF (Valiants)
  - Jodhpur AFS: 32 Wing
    - No. 31 Squadron IAF (Lions)
  - Lohegaon AFS: 2 Wing
    - No. 20 Squadron IAF (Lightnings)
    - No. 30 Squadron IAF (Rhinos)
  - Sirsa AFS: 45 Wing
    - No. 15 Squadron IAF (Flying Lancers)
  - Tezpur AFS: 11 Wing
    - No. 2 Squadron IAF (Winged Arrows)
    - No. 106 Squadron IAF (Lynxes)
  - Maharajpur AFS: 40 Wing
    - Tactics and Air Combat Development Establishment (TACDE)
  - Thanjavur AFS: 47 Wing
    - No. 222 Squadron IAF (Tigersharks)
  - Uttarlai AFS: 5 FBSU
    - No. 4 Squadron IAF (Oorials)

== Accidents and incidents ==
Since Su-30MKI's entry to service in 2002, the aircraft flew seven years without any major incidents. The first crash occurred in 2009. As of March 2026, 14 Su-30MKIs were lost in crashes including 5 fatalities.

- On 30 April 2009, a Su-30MKI (SB-021) from the 30 Squadron crashed in Rajasthan. Both the pilots ejected successfully but one of them succumbed to injuries. According to reports. the pilots had inadvertently switched off the aircraft's flight control system.
- On 30 November 2009, another aircraft from the 31 Squadron crashed over Pokhran, Rajasthan during a training sortie after an engine caught fire. Both pilots ejected successfully.
- On 13 December 2011, an aircraft (SB-142) of the 20 Squadron crashed at Wade-Bholai village near Pune, Maharashtra. The crash occurred due to human error after servicing of the aircraft at the Nashik facility of Hindustan Aeronautics Limited. The pilots survived.
- On 19 February 2013, a Su-30MKI crashed in Pokhran region at around 19:20 IST. The crash occurred due to defunctive ordnance onboard the aircraft as the bomb exploded while it was attached on to the underwing pylons. The pilots survived.
- On 14 October 2014, one Su-30MKI crashed in Pune.
- On 19 May 2015, one Su-30MKI crashed in Tezpur, Assam.
- On 15 March 2017, a Su-30MKI crashed in the Barmer district of Rajasthan during a training sortie. The pilots ejected safely but three family members were injured as the jet crashed over a residential area. This was the seventh crash of the aircraft.
- On 23 May 2017, two pilots died after a crash of Su-30MKI (SB-063) from 2 Squadron. The aircraft took off from Tezpur AFS as a part of two aircraft formation. The aircraft later lost radar, radio and air traffic control contact at 11.10 IST. The aircraft was last detected 60 km (37 mi) north west of Tezpur.
- On 27 June 2018, a Su-30MKI crashed in Nashik, Maharashtra.
- On 8 August 2019, a Su-30MKI crashed in a paddy field near Tezpur in Assam.
- On 28 January 2023, a Su-30MKI and a Mirage 2000H of the TACDE were involved in a mid-air collision. The Mirage-2000H pilot and instructor, Wing Commander Hanumanth Rao Sarathi, was unable to eject and died in the accident, whereas the two pilots flying the Su-30MKI, ejected and were hospitalised with minor injuries. Both fighter jets had taken off from Maharajpur AFS, Gwalior for a training mission.
- On 4 June 2024, a Su-30MKI (SB-182) crashed in a farm in Shirasgaon village in Nashik district. The pilots including Wing commander Bokil and Second-in-command Biswas ejected safely from the aircraft. An investigation has been ordered by the Indian Air Force about the cause of the accident.
- On 23 August 2024, reports emerged that an IAF fighter aircraft had "inadvertently" released an "air store" over Pokhran. An investigation was launched on the matter. Later, it was confirmed that the concerned aircraft was a Su-30MKI while the air store was a Rampage missile.
- On 5 March 2026, a Su-30MKI crashed in Karbi Anglong region, about 60 km (37 mi) from Jorhat, while on a training mission after it lost contact with radar at 19:42 IST after takeoff from Jorhat Air Force Station. Both the pilots, Squadron Leader Anuj and Flight Lieutenant Purvesh Duragkar, were killed.

== Specifications (Su-30MKI) ==
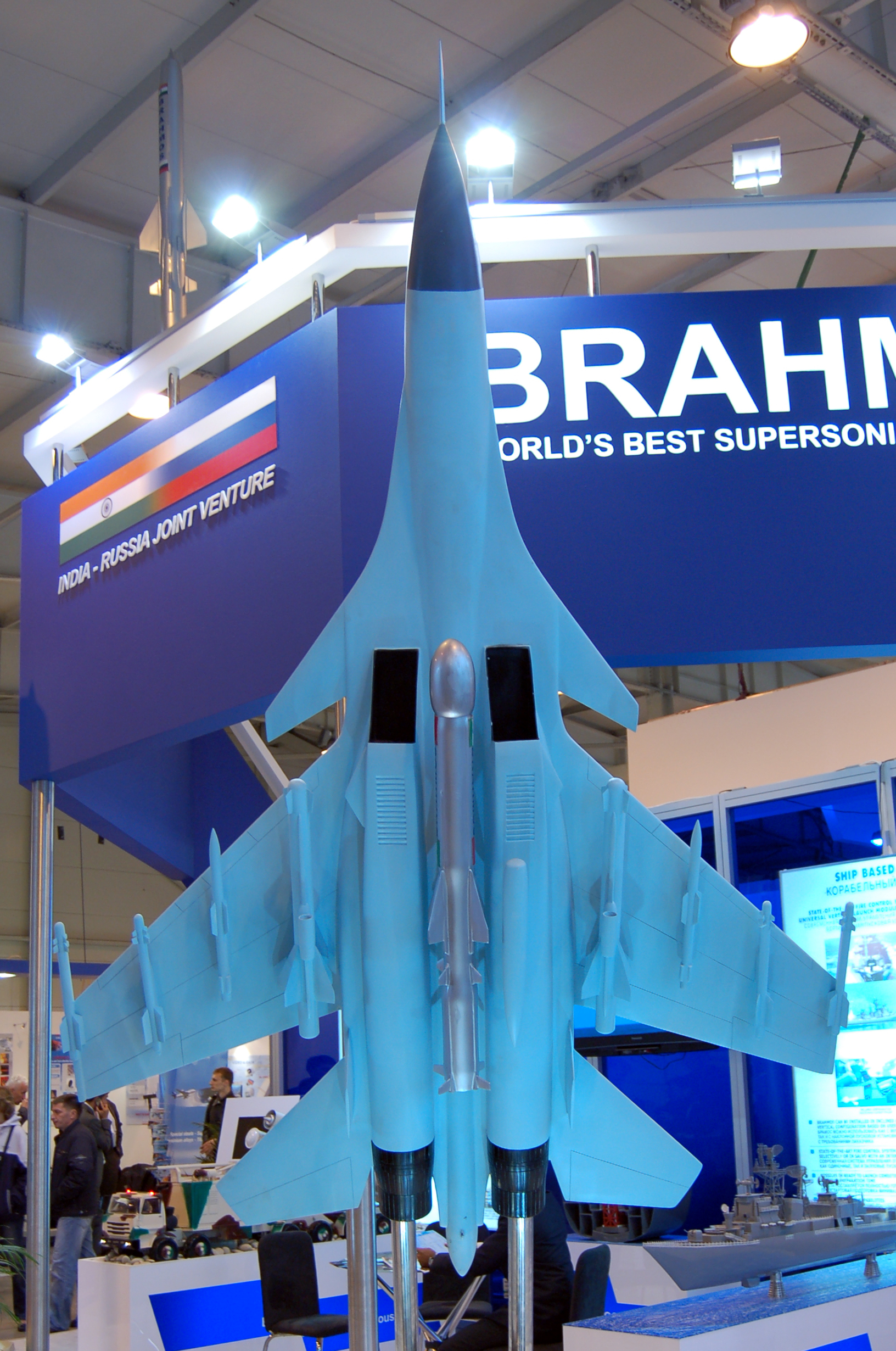
BrahMos missile under Su-30MKI model at MAKS-2009

Data from Irkut, Sukhoi, deagel.com

General characteristics

- Crew: 2
- Length: 21.935 m (72 ft 0 in)
- Wingspan: 14.7 m (48 ft 3 in)
- Height: 6.36 m (20 ft 10 in)
- Wing area: 62 m^{2} (670 sq ft)
- Empty weight: 18,400 kg (40,565 lb)
- Gross weight: 26,090 kg (57,519 lb) (typical mission weight)
- Max takeoff weight: 38,800 kg (85,539 lb)
- Fuel capacity: 9640 kg (internal)
- Powerplant: 2 × Lyulka AL-31FP afterburning turbofan engines, 123 kN (28,000 lbf) with afterburner

Performance

- Maximum speed: 2,120 km/h (1,320 mph, 1,140 kn) / Mach 2.0 at high altitude

1,350 km/h (840 mph; 730 kn) / M1.09 at low altitude

- Range: 3,000 km (1,900 mi, 1,600 nmi) at high altitude

1,270 km (790 mi; 690 nmi) at low altitude

- Ferry range: 8,000 km (5,000 mi, 4,300 nmi) with two in-flight refuellings
- Service ceiling: 17,300 m (56,800 ft)
- g limits: +9
- Rate of climb: 300 m/s (59,000 ft/min) +
- Wing loading: 401 kg/m^{2} (82 lb/sq ft)

Armament

- Guns: 1 × 30 mm Gryazev-Shipunov GSh-30-1 autocannon
- Hardpoints: 12 hardpoints (2 × wing-tip AAM launch rails, 6 × pylons under-wing, 2 × pylon under-engine nacelles, and 2 × pylons in tandem in the "arch" between the engines. It can be increased to 14 using multiple ejector racks.) with a capacity of up to 8,130 kg (17,920 lb), with provisions to carry combinations of:
  - Rockets:
    - 4 × S-8
    - 4 × S-13
  - Missiles:
    - Air-to-air missiles:
      - 10 × R-77
      - 10 × I-Derby ER
      - 10 × Astra Mk-1
      - 10 × Astra Mk-2 (future)
      - 6 × R-27ER/ET
      - 2 × R-27R/T
      - 6 × R-73
      - 3 × K-100
      - MICA (tested successfully)
    - Air-to-surface missiles:
      - 3 × Kh-59ME
      - 4 × Rampage
      - 6 × Kh-29T/L
      - 2 × Nirbhay (Future)
      - Crystal Maze II
    - Anti-ship missiles:
      - 3 × Kh-59MK
      - 4 × Kh-35
      - 6 × Kh-31A
      - 1 × BrahMos
    - Anti-radiation missiles:
      - 6 × Rudram-1
      - 6 x Rudram-2 (tested successfully)
      - 6 × Kh-31P
  - Bombs:
    - 8 × KAB-500L laser-guided bombs
    - 3 × KAB-1500L laser-guided bombs
    - 3 × Sudarshan laser-guided bombs
    - 8 × FAB-500T bombs
    - 28 × OFAB-250-270 bombs
    - 32 × OFAB-100-120 bombs
    - Spice 2000 bombs
    - 8 × RBK-500 cluster bombs
    - 20 × Smart Anti-Airfield Weapon
    - 3 × DRDO Glide Bombs
    - Khagantak-243

Other

- Litening targeting pod
- El/M-2060P airborne synthetic aperture radar reconnaissance pod
- EL/M-8222 jammer
- KNIRTI SAP-518 EW pod
- Chaffs / flares
- Buddy-buddy refuelling pod

Avionics

- Bars N011M passive electronically scanned array radar
- Virupakhsa active electronically scanned array radar (after Super Sukhoi upgrade)
- DRDO Tarang MK.II radar warning receiver
- OLS-30 laser-optical infra-red search and track

== In popular culture ==
- The Sukhoi Su-30MKI was shown in the aerial action India movie Fighter (2024 film). The protagonist of the film flies the Sukhoi Su-30MKI.

== See also ==
Related development

- Sukhoi Su-30
- Sukhoi Su-30MKA
- Sukhoi Su-30MKK
- Sukhoi Su-30MKM
- Sukhoi Su-35
- Sukhoi Su-37
- Shenyang J-16

Related lists

- List of fighter aircraft
- List of active Indian military aircraft
