= Thanjavur Air Force Station =

- IATA: TJV; ICAO: VOTJ

Summary
- Airport type: Military
- Owner: Indian Air Force
- Operator: Southern Air Command
- Serves: Thanjavur
- Location: Pilaiyarpatti, Thanjavur, Tamil Nadu, India
- Built: 1940; 86 years ago
- Elevation AMSL: 253 ft (77 m)
- Coordinates: 10°43′20″N 079°06′05″E
- Website: Official website

Map
- Location of airport in Tamil Nadu TJV (India)

Runways
Direction	Length		Surface
Direction	m	ft	Surface
07/25	3,500	11,483	Concrete
- Source: DAFIF

Thanjavur Air Force Station (IATA: TJV, ICAO: VOTJ) is an Indian Air Force base serving the city of Thanjavur in Tamil Nadu, India. It is located 12 km (7.5 mi) south-west of the city in Pilaiyarpatti and near the village of Ravusapatti. The air force base was expected to start functioning by 2012. However, the schedule was delayed, and the air force base was inaugurated on 27 May 2013 by the then Minister of Defence, A. K. Antony.

== History ==
The airfield was built and used by the Royal Indian Air Force (RAAF) in 1940 during World War II as a base for its Lockheed Hudson, Vickers Wellington, Hawker Hurricane, and P-47 Thunderbolt aircraft. After independence, the airfield was handed over to the Government of India for civilian use and eventually came under the jurisdiction of the Airports Authority of India (AAI). With the formation of the Southern Air Command in 1984, a permission for 47th wing at the airfield was also provided and declared. In the early 1990s, the airport operated commercial flights to Chennai via Vayudoot, which however, did not operate for long and was stopped due to poor patronage and financial struggles the airline faced, that caused it to cease operations in 1997. The Indian Air Force (IAF) took over the airfield in March 1990. During the heavy floods in Tamil Nadu in November 2008, IAF helicopters operating from Thanjavur dropped 15,000 kg of relief materials to the affected areas, operating from the air force base. The land acquisition for revamping the entire airfield began in 2006 and was completed and inaugurated by the former on 27 May 2013 by the former Minister of Defence, A. K. Antony.

== Development ==
To foster socio-economic development and growth, connectivity and tourism in the state, there have been repeated attempts by both the state and the central governments to restart commercial operations in the airport, since Vayudoot ceased operations in 1997. Such attempts have increased consistently after the conversion of the airport into a revamped air force base in 2013, also as part of the government's UDAN Scheme to develop more airports in India to improve connectivity and encourage people to travel by air. In December 2022, the Airports Authority of India (AAI) signed a Memorandum of Understanding (MoU) with the Indian Air Force (IAF) for exchange of land to the AAI, so that they can regain their control over the airport and develop it for facilitating commercial operations, which they had until 1990. Out of 56.16 acres as the total land area, the IAF has granted 26.5 acres of land to AAI, where it has proposed to develop the airport as a passenger terminal. In November 2023, the AAI announced that the terminal and other associated world will be constructed at a cost ₹ 200 crore. The development works are expected to take at least a year to complete, after receiving nods from the state and central governments and the Ministry of Civil Aviation. Land acquisition for the project is yet to be done; meanwhile, the work on a 4-lane airport approach road is yet to be started after receiving permission and assistance from the Government of Tamil Nadu.

== Facilities ==
The airport is situated at an elevation of 253 feet (77 m) above mean sea level. It had two runways with concrete surfaces: 07/25, measuring 5,680 by 150 feet (1,731 m × 46 m), and 14/32, measuring 4,757 by 150 feet (1,450 m × 46 m), out of which the 14/32 runway has been now converted into a taxiway.

== Operational aircraft ==
It is home to the No. 222 squadron of the IAF's Sukhoi Su-30 MKI fighter aircraft - the first IAF fighter squadron in Southern India. A new helicopter unit composing of Chetak (SA 316B) helicopters was inducted in Thanjavur on 19 March 2024. The unit was tasked with peacetime Search and Rescue and Humanitarian Assistance and Disaster Relief (HADR) operations.
